= Battle of Orbaizeta =

1794 battle in War of the Pyrenees

Coordinates: 42.9744°N 1.2294°W

- Part of the War of the Pyrenees
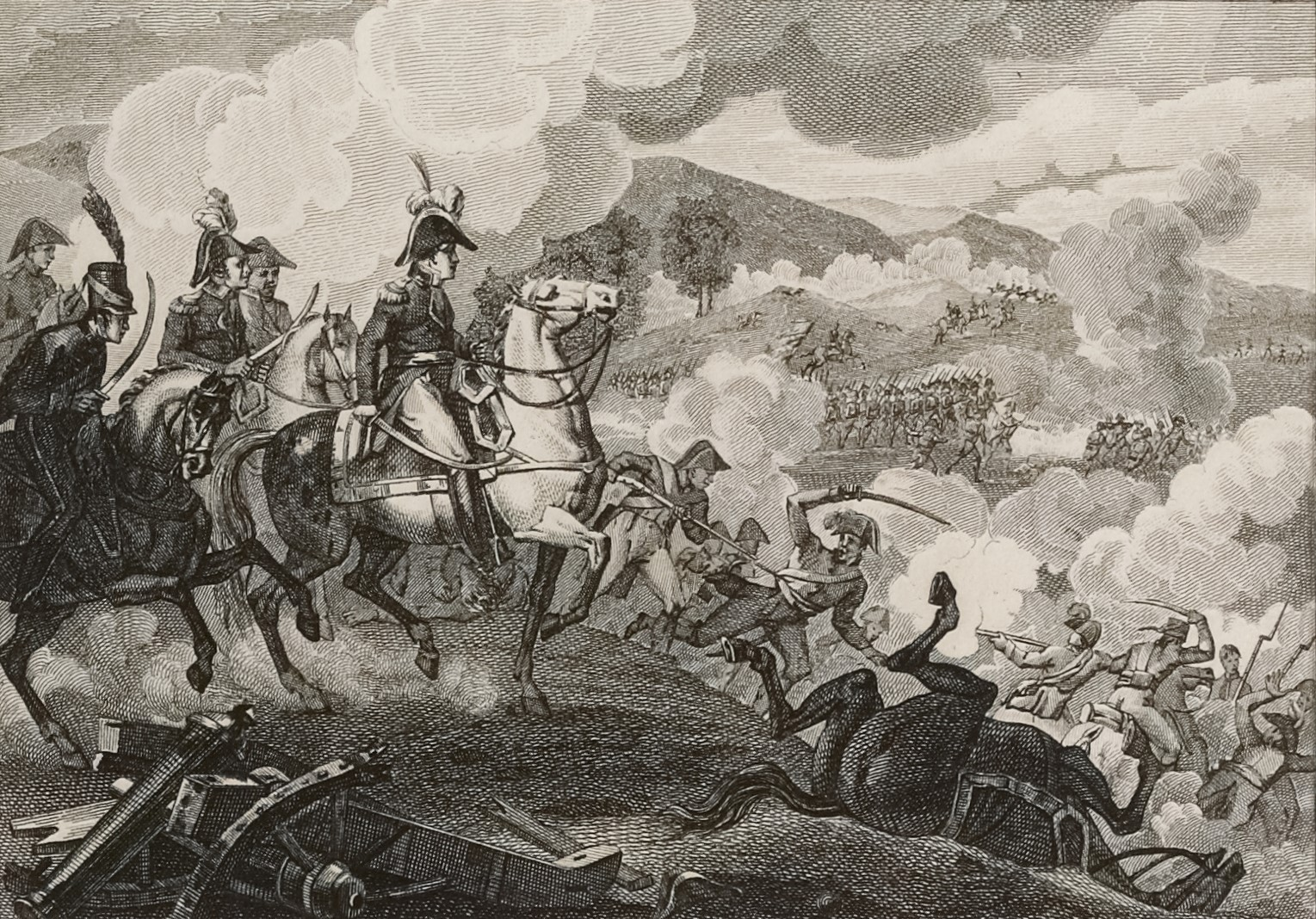
- Engraving of General Moncey at the Battle of Orbaizeta, c. 1808–1813
Date	15–17 October 1794
Location	Orbaizeta, Navarre, Spain
Result	French victory

Belligerents
France	Spain

Commanders and leaders
(France) Bon-Adrien Moncey	(Spain) Duke of Osuna

Strength
46,000	13,000

Casualties and losses
Not known	4,000, 50 cannons

The Battle of Orbaizeta was fought from 15 to 17 October 1794 during the War of the Pyrenees, between the French Army of the western Pyrenees led by Bon-Adrien Jeannot de Moncey and Spanish forces under the command of Pedro Téllez-Girón, 9th Duke of Osuna. Part of the wider French Revolutionary Wars, this engagement was fought over a wide area to the northwest and northeast of Pamplona in Navarre and ended in a French victory. The Spanish defenders gave up territory to the north of Pamplona, including a number of strategic locations.

== Background ==
While 1793 saw no important battles in the western Pyrenees, the following year saw significant action. With General of Division (MG) Jacques Léonard Muller leading the Army of the western Pyrenees, minor engagements occurred at Hendaye on 5 February, Izpegi Pass on 3 June, and at Bera (Vera) on 23 June. In late July, Muller put MG Moncey in charge of three divisions, including his own and those of MG Henri Delaborde and MG Jean Henri Guy Nicolas de Frégeville. With this force, Moncey won the Battle of the Baztan Valley and followed up his success by capturing Pasaia, San Sebastián and Tolosa. Promoted to command the army for his great success, Moncey planned to lay siege to the Spanish fortress of Pamplona.

== Battle ==
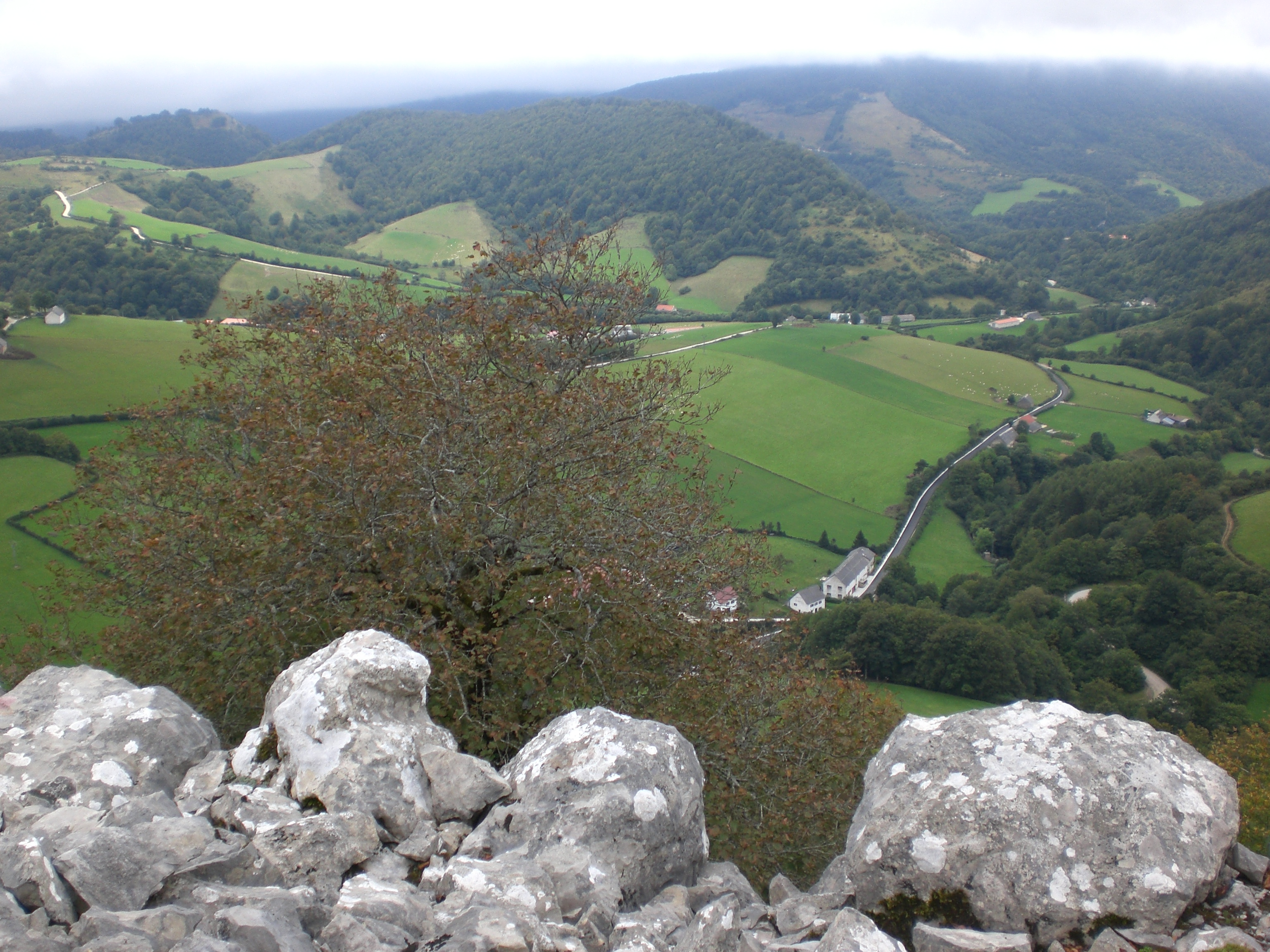
Terrain south of Orbaizeta

On 15 October 1794, Moncey launched an offensive on a broad front with 46,000 troops. Commanding the French divisions were Generals of Division Delaborde, Frégeville, Jean Mauco, Thomas-Alexandre Dumas, and Jean-Antoine Marbot. Generals of Brigade Antoine Digonet, Pierre Rouché (Roucher), Louis Hyacinthe Le Feron, Pierre Bories de Castelpers, and Jean Daniel Pinet led brigades during the operation. (Note: Smith also lists a General Moraud, but no general by this name can be identified in the French Wikipedia Liste des généraux de la Révolution et du Premier Empire.) Lieutenant General Duke of Osuna commanded the 13,000 Spanish defenders of Navarre. His commanders were Generals Manuel Cagigal, Antonio Filangieri, Frias, and Marquis de la Canada Ibagniez. (Note: Smith spells the name Filianghiery.)

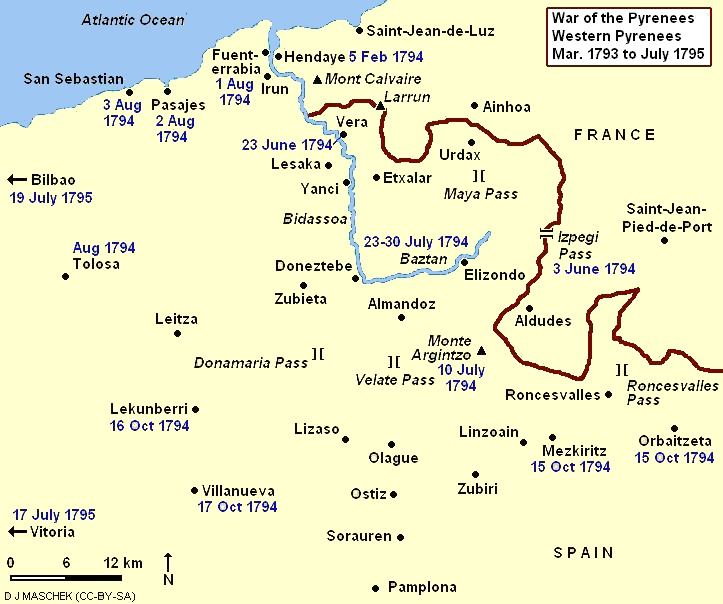
War of the Pyrenees, Western Theater

Moncey launched his offensive from the Baztan valley, and from the area of Roncevaux Pass to the south toward Pamplona. On the west, the attack was from Leitza toward Lekunberri. In the center, the direction of advance was from Doneztebe across the Donamaria Pass and from Elizondo across the Puerto de Belate (Velate Pass) toward Sorauren. In the east, the French moved from Roncesvalles (Orreaga) southeast to the Rio Urroti valley and southwest to the Rio Irati. Moncey, who had "a particular penchant for encircling movements" hoped to cut off substantial enemy forces.

On 15 October, Delaborde's division attacked Filangieri at Mezkiritz (Mezquiriz), 8 kilometres (5.0 mi) southwest of Roncesvalles. The French deployed 11 infantry and two grenadier battalions, plus 640 dragoons and hussars. The Spanish suffered 200 killed and 724 captured out of a total of 4,000 troops engaged, while French losses are unknown.

The French captured Lekunberri on 16 October and Villanueva, 9 kilometres (5.6 mi) farther south, on 17 October. Both villages were at the western end of the line. At the eastern extremity, Orbaizeta fell together with its arms foundry, which was 4 kilometres (2.5 mi) north of the village. The French also captured the Spanish navy's mast store on the Irati and a second foundry at Egui. The offensive stopped short of Pamplona because the Representatives-on-mission did not authorize a further advance. The bulk of the defenders escaped encirclement. One authority faults Delaborde for failing to cut off the Spanish. The Spanish losses numbered about 4,000 soldiers killed, wounded, and missing. In addition, the French seized 50 artillery pieces. French casualties are unknown.

The French inflicted damage on the Spanish army and gained ground closer to the Pamplona fortress. Even worse for the Spanish was the loss of two arms foundries and the navy's mast store. In November 1794, the Spanish suffered a disaster at the Battle of the Black Mountain in the eastern Pyrenees. A deadly outbreak of disease stalled French operations in the western Pyrenees during the winter 1794–1795. In June 1795, Moncey launched a victorious advance to the west, taking Vitoria and Bilbao. The Peace of Basel on 22 July 1795 brought the war to a close. When the news of peace reached the front in August, Moncey's advance was across the Ebro, while other forces prepared to invest Pamplona.

== Notes ==
Footnotes

Citations
