= Augustin de Lespinasse =

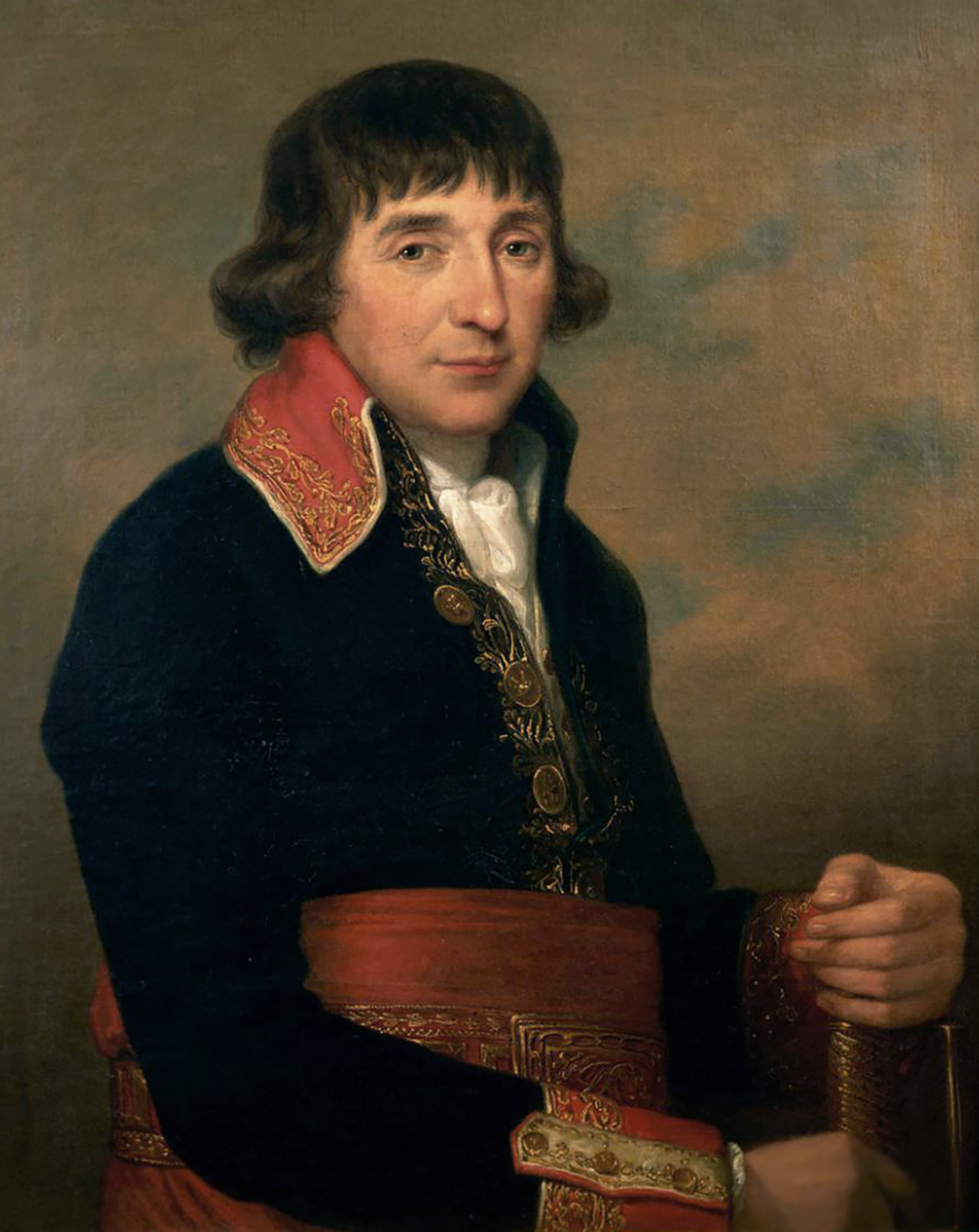
- Portrait by Angelica Kauffmann, 1798
- Born: 8 October 1737; Pouilly-sur-Loire, France
- Died: 23 November 1816 (aged 79) Paris, France
- Allegiance: Kingdom of France; France
- Branch: Artillery
- Service years: (Kingdom of France) 1759–1792 (France) 1792–1804
- Rank: General of Division
- Conflicts: Seven Years' War; War of the Pyrenees; Battle of Sans Culottes Camp; Battle of the Baztan Valley; War of the First Coalition; Battle of Castiglione; Battle of Rovereto; Battle of Arcole; Siege of Mantua
- Awards: Légion d'Honneur, GO 1804; Order of the Iron Crown, 1807; Order of Saint-Louis, 1814
- Other work: Sénat conservateur, 1804; Count of the Empire, 1808; Chamber of Peers, 1814

Augustin de Lespinasse (8 October 1737 – 23 November 1816) commanded French artillery during the French Revolutionary Wars. After fighting in the Seven Years' War he switched to the artillery branch. He advanced in rank to major by 1788 and was attached to the Army of the Rhine in 1791. After transferring to the Army of the Western Pyrenees as chief of artillery, he directed the successful defence of the Sans Culottes Camp in February 1794. He was soon promoted to general of division but the Minister of War blocked his continued employment.

Lespinasse transferred to the Army of Italy under Napoleon Bonaparte in 1796. He fought with distinction at Castiglione, Rovereto, Arcole and Mantua. Thereafter he published a treatise on the organization of artillery. After becoming emperor Napoleon appointed Lespinasse to the Senate and gave him other honors. Lespinasse is one of the names inscribed under the Arc de Triomphe, on Column 35.

== Early career ==
Lespinasse was born in Pouilly-sur-Loire on 8 October 1737. He joined the Black Musketeers of the Maison du Roi and later in 1759 (Note: Mullié gave the year 1769 but the chronology suggested this is certainly a misprint for 1759.) he transferred to the carabiniers with the rank of cornet. He fought in the final campaigns of the Seven Years' War as aide-de-camp to Colonel de Poyanne. After the war's end in 1763 he switched to the artillery branch with the rank of lieutenant. The Minister of War Étienne François, duc de Choiseul, noting Lespinasse's intelligence, assigned him to write a treatise on practical trigonometry and leveling. This paper was published in 1768.

Lespinasse had been promoted to captain on 24 March 1767. Other officers were jealous of his promotion and he was obliged to fight a number of duels in which he showed himself courageous and generous. He was attached to the fortress of Strasbourg and became inspector of the weapons manufacturers at Saint-Étienne and Maubeuge. On 25 May 1788 he received promotion to major and put in charge of setting up an artillery depot on the Loire River, but the French Revolution ended that project.

== French Revolution ==
On 1 January 1791 Lespinasse was promoted colonel of the 5th Foot Artillery Regiment. On 26 March 1793 he became chef de brigade of the 2nd Artillery Regiment with the Army of the Rhine. He subsequently transferred to the Army of the Western Pyrenees. In 1793 this army had 15 artillery companies with Lespinasse as chief of artillery. The army's artillery establishment needed to be set up from "almost nothing" according to one historian. Besides receiving field guns from the interior, 535 pieces were seized from the Spanish over the course of the War of the Pyrenees. Most of the captured guns lacked carriages, but Lespinasse managed to provide carriages for the pieces. He also equipped a pontoon train and a siege train, though a severe shortage of draft horses limited their usefulness. His fertile mind came up with the idea of forming armorer companies to repair the stockpile of captured Spanish muskets.

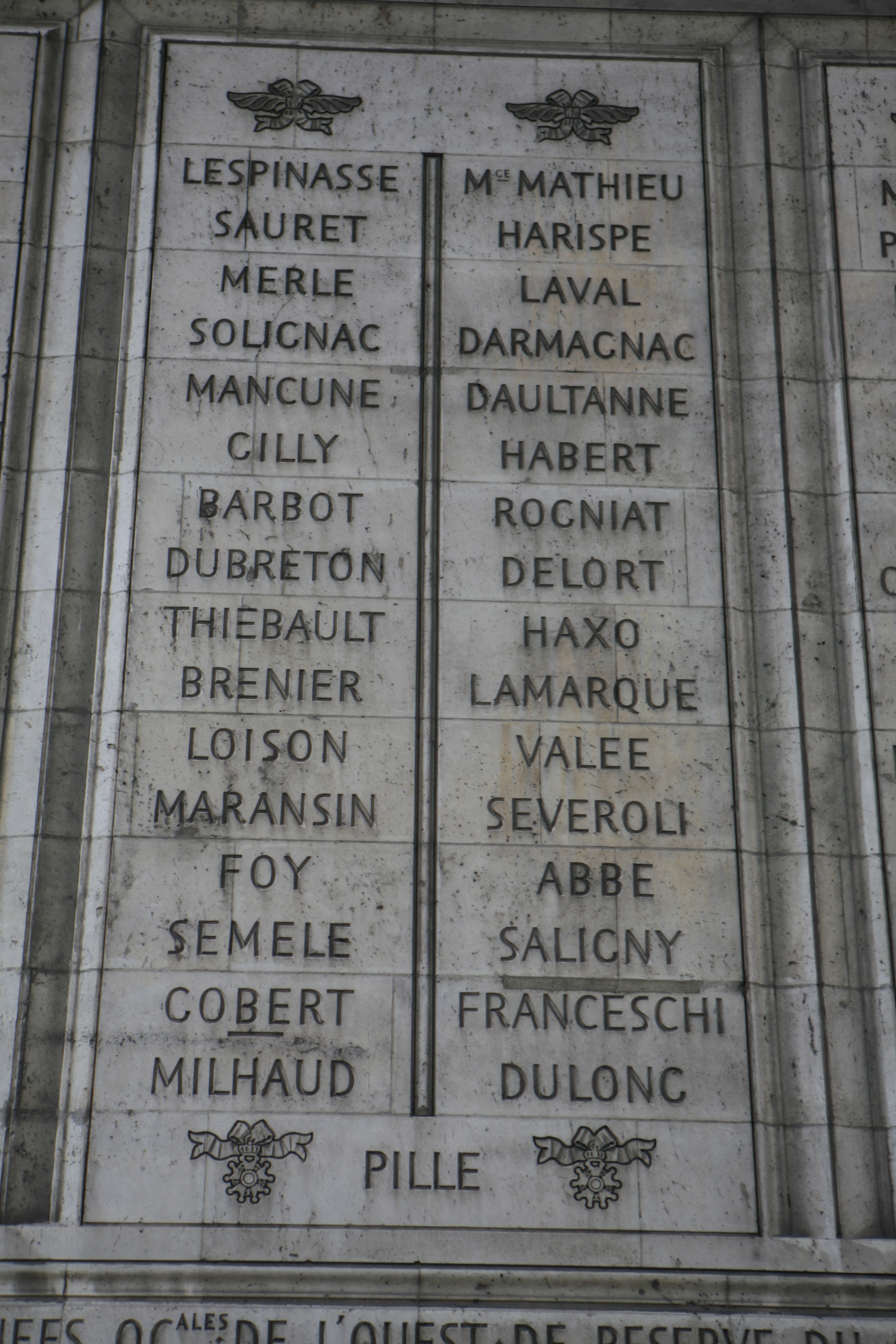
Lespinasse is at the top of Column 35

The French built the Sans Culottes Camp covering the village of Urrugne near the Bay of Biscay. The camp was used as a place to train new conscripts. One notable feature of the Sans Culottes Camp was that the soldiers lived in huts instead of tents. Jacques Léonard Muller organized his army into 40 battalions in five divisions, despite having to send 8,000 troops to other armies in January 1794. The 26 best battalions were distributed among the front-line divisions of Jean Henri Guy Nicolas de Frégeville, Bon-Adrien Jeannot de Moncey and Henri François Delaborde while the remaining 14 were parceled out to the divisions of Jean-Antoine Marbot and Jean Mauco. Lespinasse was in charge of building fortifications during the winter. These earthworks consisted of forts connected by breastworks. The entire front from Hendaye to the sources of the Nive River was covered by mutually-supporting redoubts.

The Spanish army consisted of 20,000 troops of whom half were militia. The Spanish commander Captain General Ventura Caro determined to seize two strong redoubts near Hendaye called the Croix des Bouquets and the Calvaire d'Urrugne. The Spanish right wing under Pedro Téllez-Girón, 9th Duke of Osuna held Burguete, the center under José de Urrutia y de las Casas was in the Baztan Valley and the left wing under General Gil was near Irun. On 5 February 1794, 13,000 Spanish infantry and 700 cavalry and gunners under Urrutia attacked the French defenses in the Battle of Sans Culottes Camp.

The Spanish columns carried the Croix des Bouquets and the Calvaire in their initial rush. From the Croix they took the Sans Culottes Camp under artillery fire. The local French commander Frégeville was not present but Lespinasse took charge. Sacrificing his outlying positions he concentrated his strength at the Redoubt de la Liberté and a bitter fight ensued. A unit of French marines suffered heavy losses while on the other side the Irish regiment of Ultonia was roughly handled. With the Spanish advance checked, Frégeville arrived on the scene and Lespinasse offered to hand over command to his superior. Frégeville magnanimously replied, "No, you have done well; complete your work and that of France for the rest of this beautiful day". After eight hours of struggle the Spanish forces withdrew in good order. The French reported 235 casualties while Spanish losses numbered 335. Lespinasse was promoted to general of brigade on 18 February 1794. He was briefly suspended from command before being restored to duty.

At the insistence of the representatives on mission, Lespinasse was elevated to the rank of general of division in June 1794. The Battle of the Baztan Valley began on 23 July. Muller sent Moncey's 10,000-man division into the Baztan over the Maya Pass while Delaborde struck south from Biriatou toward Bera with 6,000. The Baztan was quickly overrun and soon a 12,000-man force at Lesaka threatened the right rear of the Spanish positions on the lower Bidasoa. Frégeville's 6,000 troops attacked across the river on 1 August. The Spanish retreated so hurriedly that 2,000 soldiers and 300 cannons fell into French hands. Lespinasse secured the abandoned Spanish artillery park. In the aftermath of their victory, the French bluffed their adversaries into surrendering both the fortresses of Fuenterrabia and San Sebastián.

The Minister of War did not recognize Lespinasse's rank and refused to employ him for a time. Ultimately he transferred to the Army of Italy. Soon after arriving in Italy, he forced the surrender of the Milan citadel within 11 days. Lespinasse became the army's artillery chief with Géraud Duroc serving as his aide-de-camp. On 8 June, he, Jean-Mathieu-Philibert Sérurier and François, marquis de Chasseloup-Laubat reconnoitered the fortress of Mantua. He fought at the Battles of Castiglione, Rovereto and Arcole and at the Siege of Mantua. He was several times mentioned in Napoleon Bonaparte's bulletins as being "covered in glory". Lespinasse went on Louis-Alexandre Berthier's expedition to Rome after the murder of Mathurin-Léonard Duphot. This was in January 1798. That year he was appointed chief of artillery of the Army of England. At a later date, he and Gabriel Marie Joseph, comte d'Hédouville conducted negotiations with the rebels in Brittany.

== Empire ==
Emperor Napoleon named Lespinasse a Grand Officer of the Légion d'Honneur on 14 June 1804. Lespinasse published Essay on the organization of the artillery arm. He first had the idea while with the Army of the Rhine, he applied his methods in the Army of the Western Pyrenees and his ideas matured while he was in the Army of Italy. The emperor appointed him to the Senate, first from Pau and later from Dijon. He also served as president of the electoral college of Nièvre. In 1807 Lespinasse received the Order of the Iron Crown and in 1808 he became a Count of the Empire. Nevertheless, he voted to end the empire. King Louis XVIII made him a Peer of France on 4 June 1814 and awarded him the Order of Saint-Louis. Lespinasse designed some features in the Jardin du Luxembourg. He died at Paris on 23 November 1816. He is buried in the Père Lachaise Cemetery in the 10th Division, 2nd Line.

== Notes ==
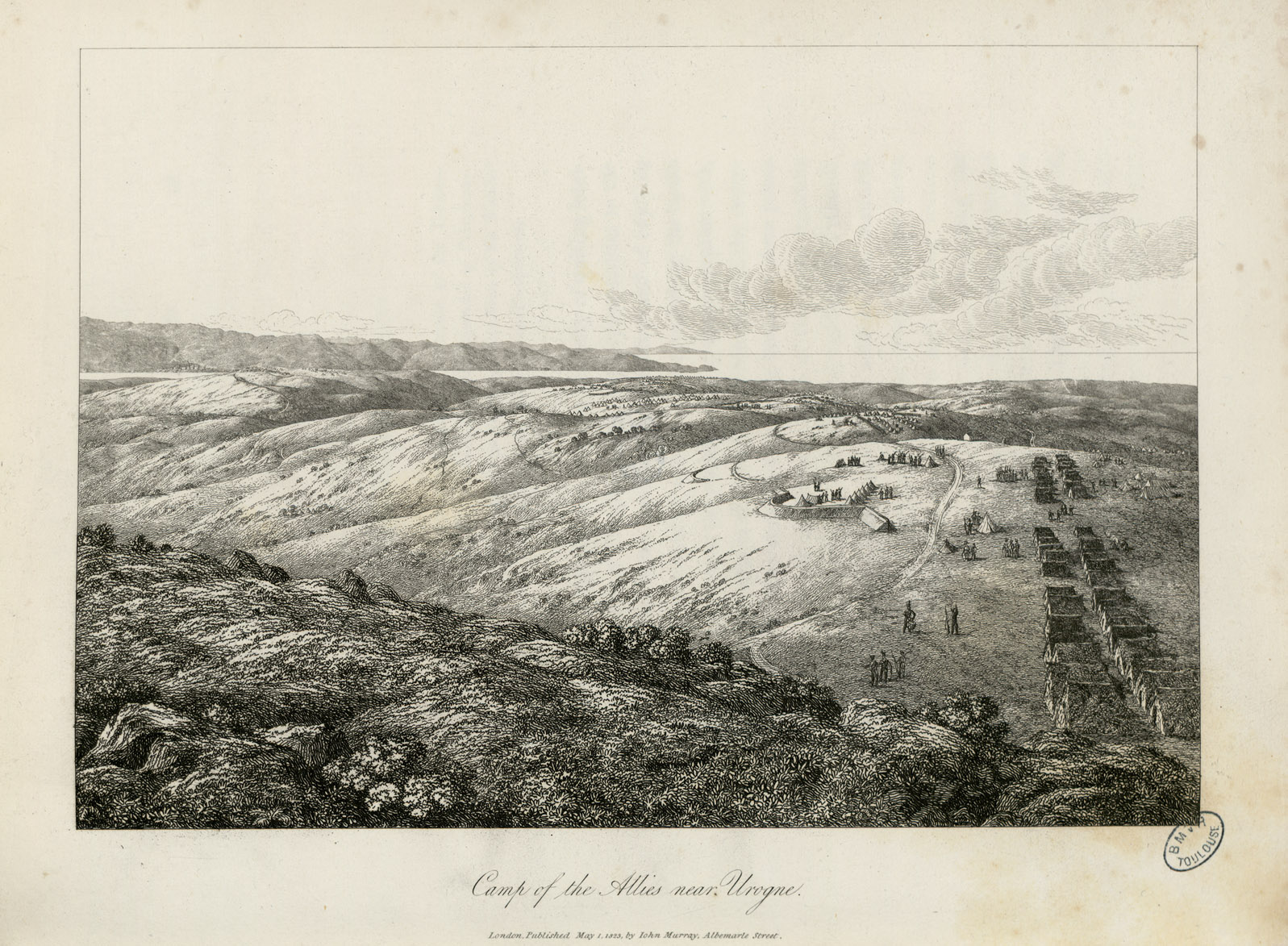
Army camp at Urrugne, c. 1814

Footnotes

Citations
