= Army of the Western Pyrenees =

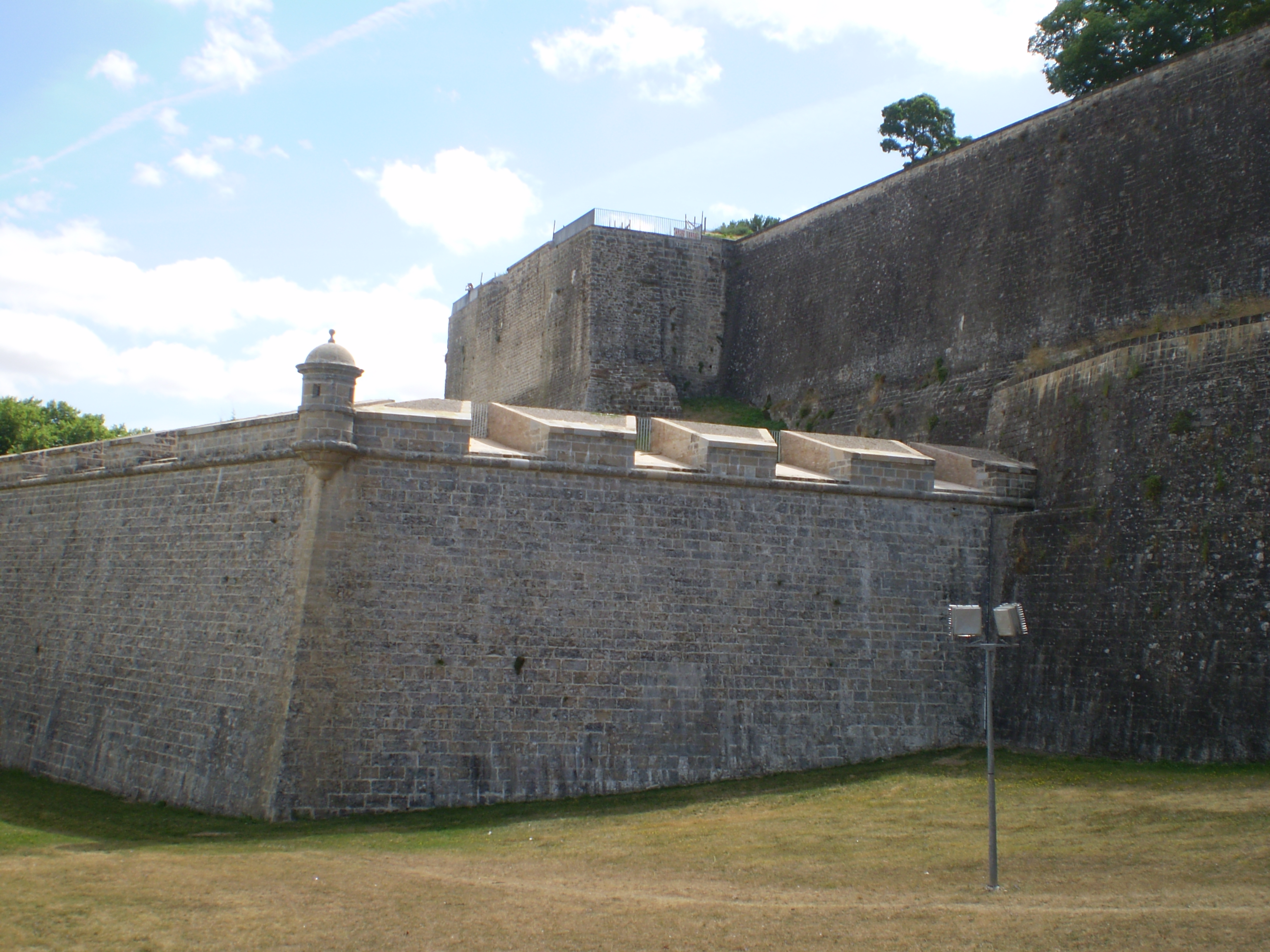
- The defenses of Pamplona, the object of French advances, remained in Spanish control during the war.
- Active: 1793–1795
- Country: (France) French First Republic
- Type: Army
- Role: Operations in Basque Country and Navarre
- Engagements: War of the Pyrenees

Commanders
- Notable commanders: Jacques Léonard Muller; Bon-Adrien de Moncey

The Army of the Western Pyrenees (Armée des Pyrénées occidentales) was one of the Republican French armies of the French Revolutionary Wars. From April 1793 until 12 October 1795, the army fought in the Basque Country and in Navarre during the War of the Pyrenees. After indecisive fighting during the first year of its existence, the army seized the Spanish port of San Sebastián in August 1794. By the time the Peace of Basel was signed on 22 July 1795, the Army of the Western Pyrenees held a significant portion of northeastern Spain.

The army commanders with the longest tenure were Jacques Léonard Muller, who served from October 1793 to August 1794, and Bon-Adrien Jeannot de Moncey, who served from August 1794 until the army was disbanded. Emperor Napoleon appointed Moncey a Marshal of France in 1804 during the First French Empire.

== Organisation ==
The Army of the Pyrenees was formed on 1 October 1792 and a former Minister of War, Joseph Marie Servan de Gerbey was appointed to lead it. The War of the Pyrenees between Republican France and the Kingdom of Spain began on 9 March 1793. Accordingly, the original Army of the Pyrenees was split on 30 April into the Army of the Western Pyrenees with Servan in command and the Army of the Eastern Pyrenees. Servan's new army covered a front from the Garonne River in the Pyrenees to the Bay of Biscay, then up the coast to the Gironde estuary. Historian Ramsay Weston Phipps called the Army of the Western Pyrenees the "least interesting" of the armies of the French Republic, contributing only one future marshal. On 19 May 1804, Napoleon elevated Bon-Adrien Jeannot de Moncey to the rank of marshal.

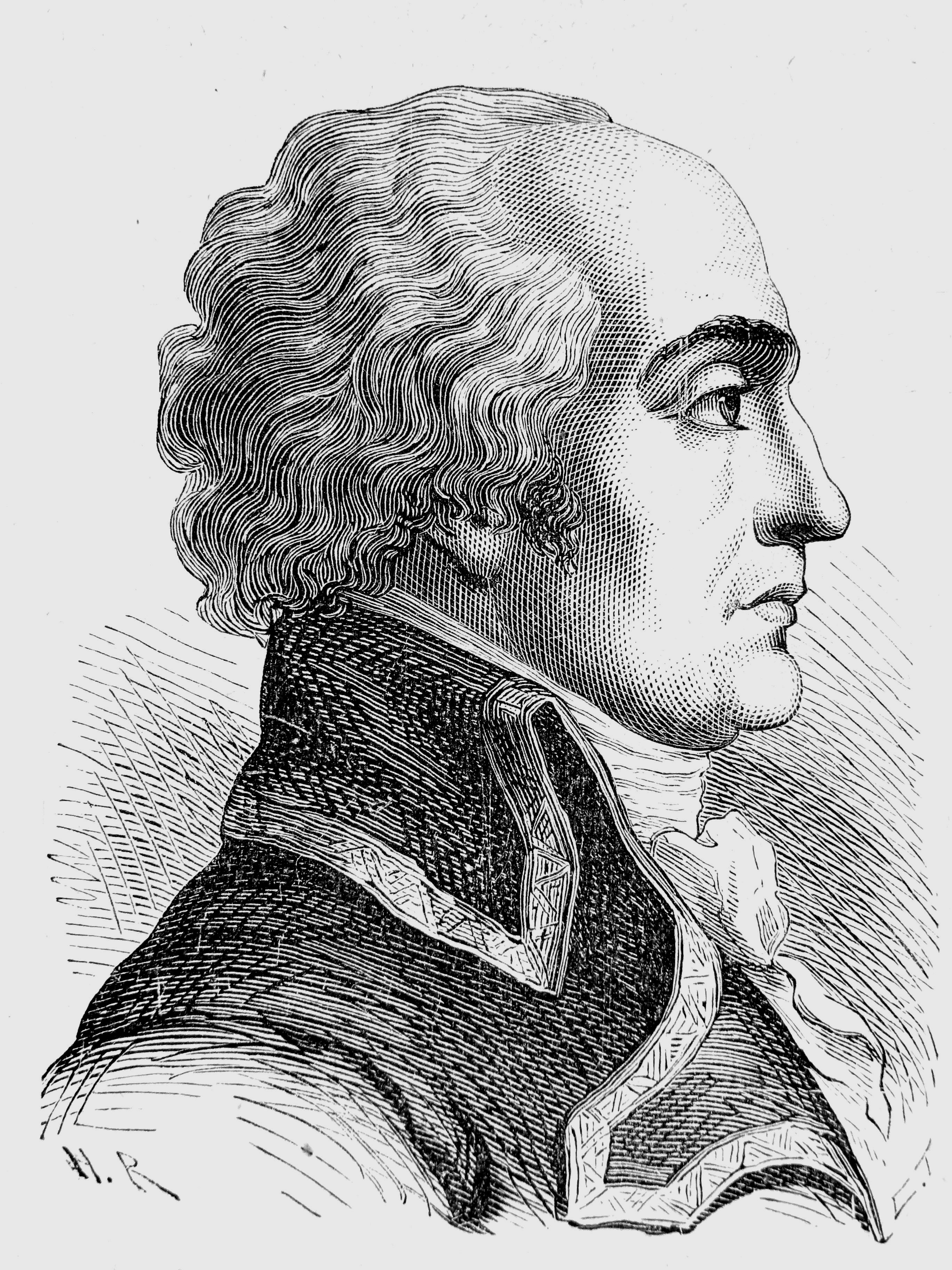
Joseph Marie Servan de Gerbey

An order of battle for 1793 listed two battalions each of the 20th, 80th, and 148th Line Infantry Demi-brigades and the 5th Light Infantry Battalion. In addition to 18 free companies, there were the following National Guard infantry battalions, Aldudes, 3rd Dordogne, 3rd Landes, 4th Lot-et-Garonne and Paris Louvre. The cavalry regiments were the 18th Dragoons, Volunteers of the Western Pyrenees (later the 12th Hussars) and Bayonne Volunteer Chasseurs (later the 24th Chasseurs à Cheval). There were also 15 artillery companies. In March 1793, Servan had about 10,000 troops at his disposal. At first the volunteer battalions averaged only about 200 men apiece, but in May 1793 they were all recruited up to strengths of 784 soldiers.

The first amalgame began in 1793 and by 5 September five demi-brigades were created with a nominal strength of 2,437 men and divided into three battalions of 812 soldiers. Eventually, 18 more demi-brigades were formed, giving the army a total of 60,000 men. Of these, probably one-third served in garrisons and were of lower quality. Because it was difficult to procure forage, the cavalry was perpetually understrength and about two-thirds of the horses died during the course of the war. Fortunately, the terrain did not lend itself to operations by mounted troops. Military transport and the artillery also suffered from the problem of inadequate forage and never had enough horses. The artillery arm was built up from scratch into a considerable force thanks largely to the capture of 535 Spanish guns and the efforts of the army's artillery chief Augustin de Lespinasse. He also created a pontoon train and units of artisans who repaired muskets taken from the Spaniards. Another innovation of the Army of the Western Pyrenees was its organization of work companies. While the army's soldiers initially suffered due to lack of supplies, by the end of the war the troops were well equipped by their logistical base at Bayonne.

Because Servan was associated with Jean-Marie Roland, vicomte de la Platière of the fallen Girondist faction, he was dismissed on 4 July 1793. Servan was temporarily replaced by Anne François Augustin de La Bourdonnaye until 11 July when Pierre Joseph du Chambge d'Elbecq arrived to take command. La Bourdonnaye took command of the right wing but he died at Dax on 7 October 1793. D'Elbecq died on 31 August 1793 at Saint-Jean-de-Luz, having accomplished very little. He was succeeded by Étienne Deprez-Crassier who irritated the representatives-on-mission. Deprez-Crassier was dismissed on 4 October and arrested four days after. The following day, Jacques Léonard Muller was named the army's commander-in-chief. Muller had been appointed the army's chief of staff and promoted to general of brigade on 5 July 1793. As general of brigade he was junior to ten generals of division but he was the choice of the all-powerful representatives-on-mission. On 8 September 1793 the Minister of War sent Thomas-Alexandre Dumas to take command of the army and promoted several officers to general of brigade. The representatives refused to recognize Dumas' authority or the promotions. In the end they won and Dumas was merely recognized as a division commander.

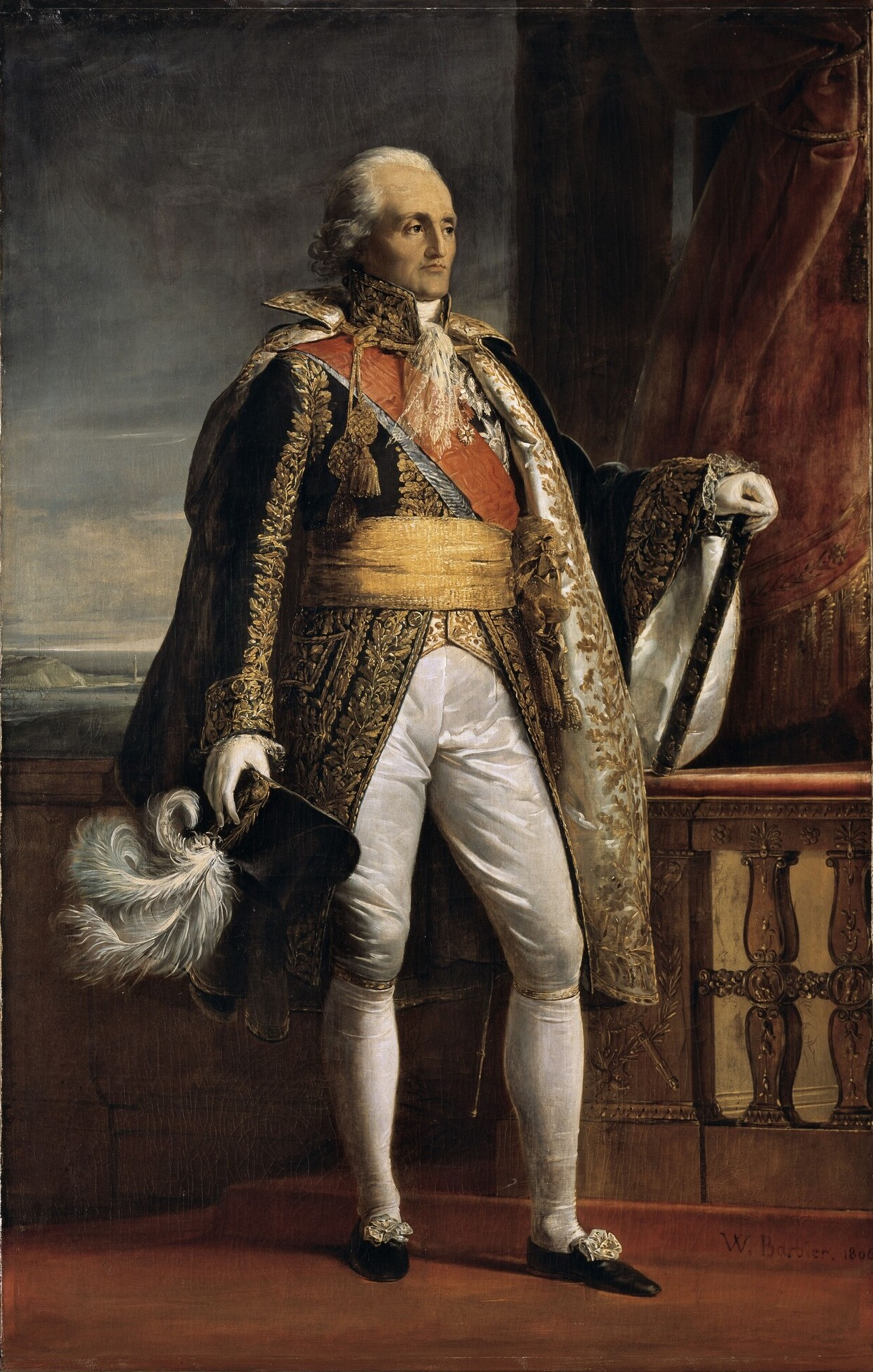
Bon-Adrien de Moncey

In July 1793, the Army of the Western Pyrenees numbered 28,000 infantry, 1,500 gunners and 700 cavalry. Muller organized the army which was something it previously lacked. In January 1794 he sent reinforcements totaling 8,000 to the War in the Vendée under Dumas and to the Army of the Eastern Pyrenees. Despite this subtraction the army counted 40 battalions that month. Of these, the 26 best battalions were formed into three divisions under Moncey, Henri François Delaborde, and Jean Henri Guy Nicolas de Frégeville. The remaining 14 battalions were assigned to two new divisions under Jean-Antoine Marbot and Jean Mauco, and were posted on the left wing. Muller's promotion to general of division finally came through on 14 April 1794.

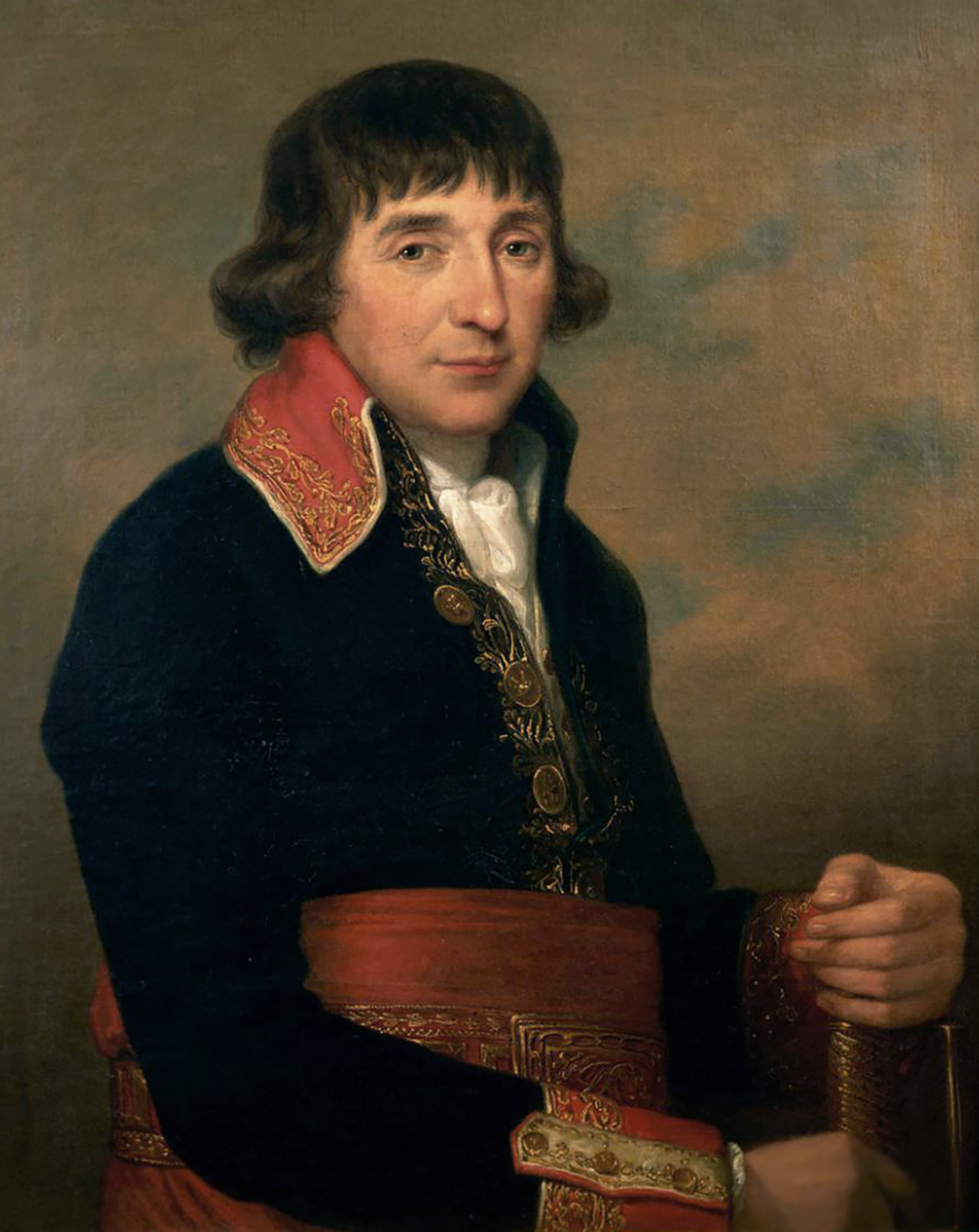
Augustin de Lespinasse

The army won a significant victory in the Battle of the Baztan Valley in July 1794. Worn out by disputes with the overbearing representatives Jean-Baptiste Cavaignac and Jacques Pinet, Muller resigned his post since his triumph kept him safe from the guillotine. Moncey was promoted to army command after his brilliant success in capturing San Sebastián on 3 August 1794. He enjoyed good luck in that the Reign of Terror ended on 27 July 1794, and with it the French government's practice of executing unsuccessful generals. Despite his modest protest that he was unsuited to high command, Muller and the representatives recommended Moncey over more senior generals. The government approved the appointment on 17 August and Moncey assumed command on 1 September.

Though Cavaignac, Pinet and Pierre-Arnaud Dartigoeyte were soon replaced, the new representatives such as Pierre-Anselm Garrau also tended to meddle in military decisions. As troublesome as the representatives could be, it is also true that no Army of the Western Pyrenees army commander was guillotined. The army was supposed to be reinforced from the Vendée by 15,000 troops but only 3,000 foot soldiers and 500 horsemen arrived in mid-September. For the fall 1794 offensive, Moncey's army numbered 52,000 troops in 64 battalions and four cavalry regiments. During the winter, an epidemic killed 3,000 soldiers and many inhabitants in the occupied areas of Spain.

Moncey reorganized his army so that each regiment had two field battalions while the third battalion, which had the poorest material, served on garrison duty. He detached grenadier companies from each battalion to form a reserve. A siege train was assembled at Bayonne under Armand Samuel de Marescot in preparation for attacking the fortress of Pamplona. The representatives dismissed Frégeville and Marbot on 9 June 1795 while Delaborde was transferred to the Army of Rhin-et-Moselle. After beginning to receive reinforcements from the Vendée in late June, Moncey launched his summer offensive. At the time of the army's dissolution on 12 October 1795, 18 battalions and one cavalry regiment were retained to garrison the western Pyrenees, while 36 battalions and two cavalry regiments joined the Army of the West to fight in the Vendée. The latter group of 10,995 soldiers formed two divisions under Bernard Dessein and Amédée Willot de Gramprez. As they marched through their recruitment areas, desertion was so severe that only 4,000 arrived at their destination.

== Operations ==
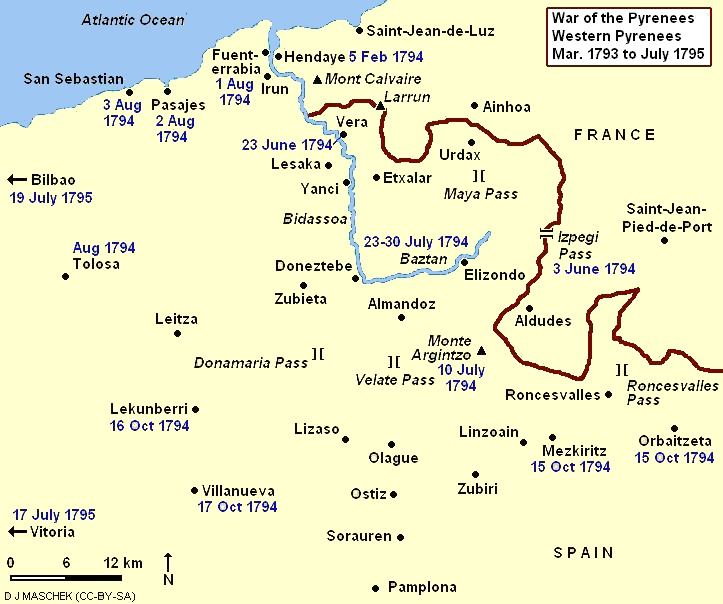
War of the Pyrenees, Western Theater

At the beginning of the War of the Pyrenees, the Spanish government decided to attack in the eastern Pyrenees while holding in the west. The Spanish had 8,000 regulars and between 9,000 and 10,000 militia in Navarre and Gipuzkoa, while from 4,000 to 5,000 troops held Aragon. The Spanish commander in the west, Ventura Caro mounted a quick offensive across the lower Bidasoa River near Hendaye. The French volunteers panicked and ran away, allowing their opponents to capture the Camp de Jolimont by 30 April 1793. For this defeat, the French general Joseph Duverger was arrested and sent to Paris. Servan pulled his troops behind the Nivelle River with his right wing at Bidart. While awaiting reinforcements behind a screen of regular and reliable volunteer units, the French commander began drilling his conscripts and raw volunteers. Massing the army's grenadier companies into one body under Théophile Corret de la Tour d'Auvergne, Servan sent them to recapture Saint-Pée-sur-Nivelle. This move was followed by a tentative advance in May.

On 27 May 1793 Servan sent a force under Pierre François Lambert Lamoureux de Genettière to threaten the Roncevaux Pass. Caro sent a column under his nephew, Pedro Caro, 3rd Marquis of la Romana, to counter the French. On 6 June the two sides clashed at Chateau-Pignon. At first Moncey with Jean Boudet, the 5th Light Infantry and few other units did well but superior Spanish forces soon forced them back on the main body. After a few rounds of artillery fire, the untried French volunteers fled leaving Genettière to be captured. La Romana's soldiers then successfully stormed Chateau-Pignon. On 22 June Servan pushed the Spanish left wing back to the Bidasoa, capturing the Montaigne Louis XIV redoubt. On 30 August, Deprez-Crassier ordered a major assault on the Spanish outpost of Biriatou. La Romana not only repelled the assault but drove the attackers back to the Sans Culottes Camp near Urrugne. On the same day, José de Urrutia y de las Casas repulsed a second column under Willot in its attack on Bera (Vera).

On 5 February 1794 in the Battle of Sans Culottes Camp, Frégeville successfully defended the camp against 13,700 Spanish troops led by Urrutia. On 3 June, a 2,300-man French brigade led by Lavictoire, part of Mauco's division, stormed the Izpegi Pass. The 1,000 defenders included Spanish and French royalist soldiers. The same day, Jacques Lefranc seized the Izpegi Ridge and other French troops captured positions near the Maya Pass. On 23 June Ventura Caro's 8,500 Spanish soldiers were repulsed by a French force defending the fortified Mont Calvaire. On 10 July Antoine Digonet's 4,000-strong brigade drove the Spanish and French Royalists from their defenses atop Monte Argintzo (Arquinzu). The French massacred 49 captured French Royalist prisoners while Marquis de Saint-Simon escaped, though badly wounded.

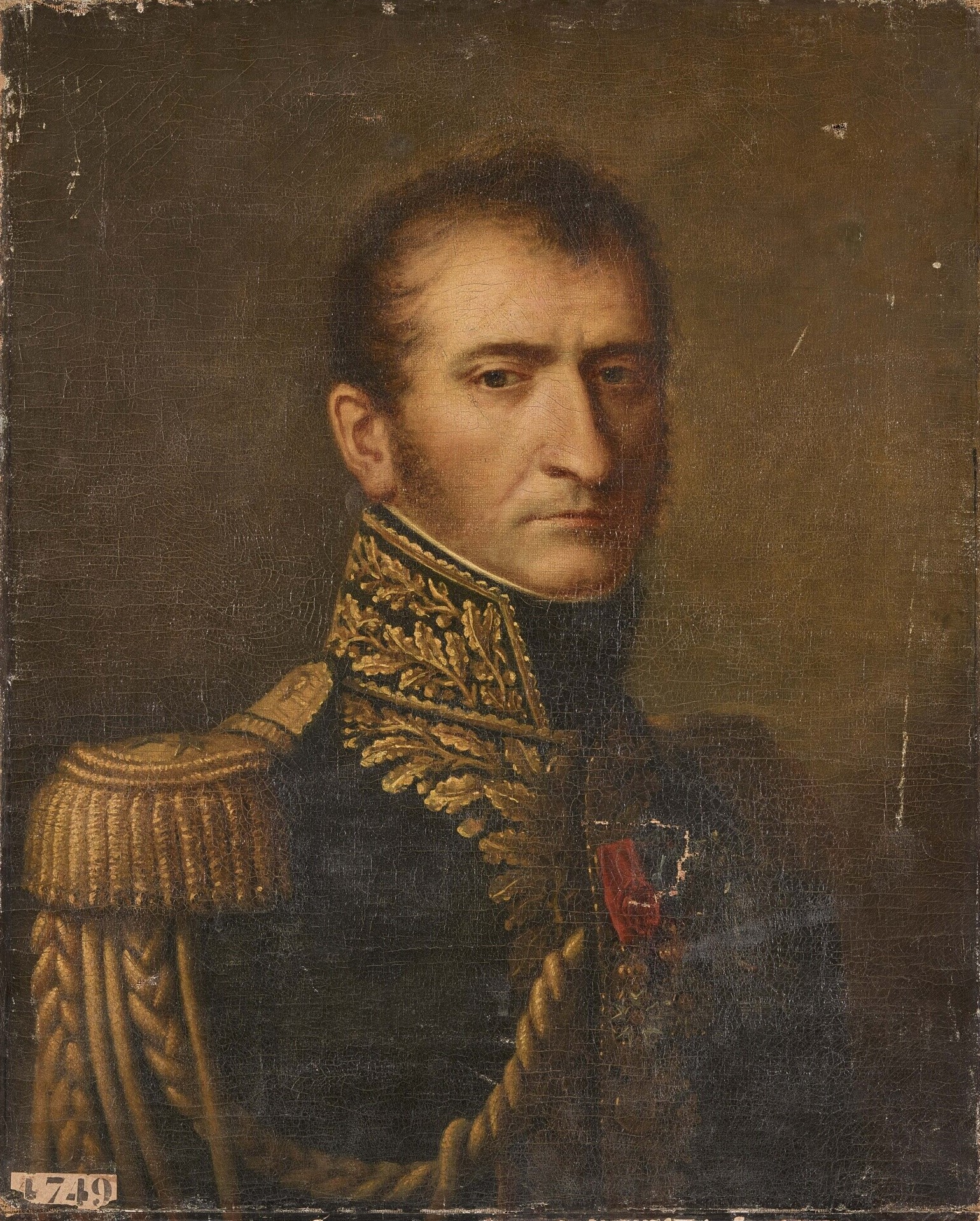
Henri Delaborde

On 23 July, the Army of the Western Pyrenees opened the Battle of the Baztan Valley by attacking the Spanish with the three front-line divisions of Moncey, Delaborde and Frégeville. The French enjoyed a numerical superiority of 30,000 to 20,000 over their adversaries. Moncey began marching over the Maya Pass with 10,000 troops on 24 July and invaded the Baztan Valley the next day. Delaborde with 6,000 men thrust south to seize Bera on the 25th. Moncey started from Elizondo with 6,000 and rendezvoused with Delaborde at Lesaka. The combined column then moved to support 6,000 soldiers under Frégeville attacking across the lower Bidasoa on 1 August. Aware that the French had gained their rear, the Spanish defenders quickly abandoned the fortress of Hondarribia (Fuenterrabia). Vicente de los Reyes surrendered with 2,000 Spanish soldiers and 300 cannon. On 3 August San Sebastián and 1,700 more Spanish soldiers plus 90 cannons fell into French hands. On this occasion, Moncey sent La Tour d'Auvergne-Corret to overwhelm the Spanish commander. As a final touch, Frégeville occupied Tolosa on 5 August.

Moncey gained another victory in the Battle of Orbaizeta on 15–17 October 1794. Frégeville advanced toward Lekunberri while Delaborde marched over the Belate Pass, defeating Antonio Filanghieri's 2,000 troops. On the 16th Delaborde and Jean Castelbert de Castelverd beat 4,000 Spaniards at Eugi and the next day drove them farther east. At the same time Moncey with the divisions of Marbot and Mauco moved against Manuel Cagigal at Roncevaux Pass. After Cagigal was forced back on Orbaizeta, Pedro Téllez-Girón, 9th Duke of Osuna ordered a general retreat to avoid encirclement, leaving behind 1,500 prisoners and 40 field pieces. The weather then closed in, preventing Moncey from fully exploiting his triumph, though the French captured Bergara on 7 November. There were rumors of peace and Servan came to Bayonne as an emissary.

The summer of 1795 found the Prince of Castelfranco leading the Spanish army in Navarre, Gipuzkoa and Aragon. To protect his left, he placed Filanghieri with 9,000 regulars at Lekunberri and Crespo with 9,000 regulars guarding Bilbao in the north. On 28 June, Moncey tried to envelop Crespo but the Spaniard retreated toward Vitoria-Gasteiz the next day. On 2 July, Moncey concentrated against Filanghieri but that general slipped away before his corps could be crushed. On 12 July, Dessein started south with 4,500 troops, capturing 25 guns abandoned by Crespo and reaching Vitoria on the 14th. As Willot moved from Salvatierra/Agurain with 3,500 men, Crespo escaped the trap and headed for Bilbao. The combined French columns pursued and occupied Bilbao on 19 July. The French took Miranda de Ebro on 22 July 1795 and Moncey prepared a blocking position there so he could move against Pamplona. However, the Peace of Basel was signed on the 22nd and the news reached the army on 5 August. The army began marching toward Bayonne on 17 August.
