= Antoine Digonet =

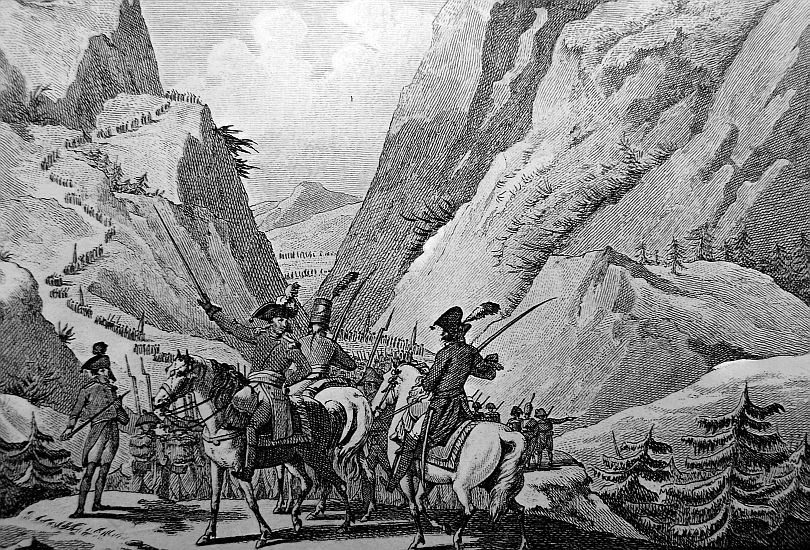
- General of Brigade Antoine Digonet
- Born: 23 January 1763; Crest, Drôme, France
- Died: 17 March 1811 (aged 48) Modena, Italy
- Allegiance: Kingdom of France; France
- Branch: Infantry
- Service years: 1779–1811
- Rank: General of Brigade
- Conflicts: American Revolutionary War; Siege of Yorktown; War of the Pyrenees; Battle of Sans Culotte; Battle of Baztan; War in the Vendée; War of the Second Coalition; Battle of Stockach; Battle of Messkirch; Battle of Biberach; War of the Third Coalition; Battle of Caldiero; Invasion of Naples; Battle of Maida
- Awards: Légion d'Honneur, CC, 1804

Antoine Digonet (23 January 1763 – 17 March 1811) commanded a French brigade during the French Revolutionary Wars and Napoleonic Wars. He joined the French Royal Army and fought in the American Revolutionary War as a foot soldier. In 1792 he was appointed officer of a volunteer battalion. He fought the Spanish in the War of the Pyrenees and was promoted to general officer. Later he was transferred to fight French royalists in the War in the Vendée. In 1800 he was assigned to the Army of the Rhine and led a brigade at Stockach, Messkirch and Biberach. Shortly after, he was transferred to Italy. In 1805 he fought under André Masséna at Caldiero. He participated in the 1806 Invasion of Naples and led his troops against the British at Maida where his brigade put up a sturdy resistance. After briefly serving in the 1809 war, he took command of Modena and died there of illness in 1811. He never married.

== Early career ==
On 23 January 1763 Digonet was born at Crest, a town in what later became the Drôme department in southeastern France. Son of surgeon Joseph Digonet, he was sent to study medicine at Montpellier. He soon quit school, enlisted in the Île-de-France Regiment when he was 16 years old and was shipped off to America in the army of Jean-Baptiste Donatien de Vimeur, comte de Rochambeau. He was wounded in the leg during the Siege of Yorktown in 1781. Continuing in the service, he advanced in rank to corporal in January 1787, sergeant in October 1789 and finally to sergeant major in 1792.

== French Revolution ==
In October 1792 he was appointed adjutant major in the 2nd Battalion of the Landes Volunteers. On 1 May 1793 he was named to command the 4th Battalion of Landes Volunteers. He took part in several actions against the Spanish during the War of the Pyrenees. On 5 February 1794 he was wounded in the right arm at the Battle of Sans Culotte Camp. In this action, a Spanish army of 13,000 infantry and 700 cavalry and gunners was repulsed by Louis Dubouquet and the Army of the Western Pyrenees after a seven-hour struggle. On 14 April 1794 Digonet received promotion to general of brigade and was assigned to the division led by Jean-Antoine Marbot.

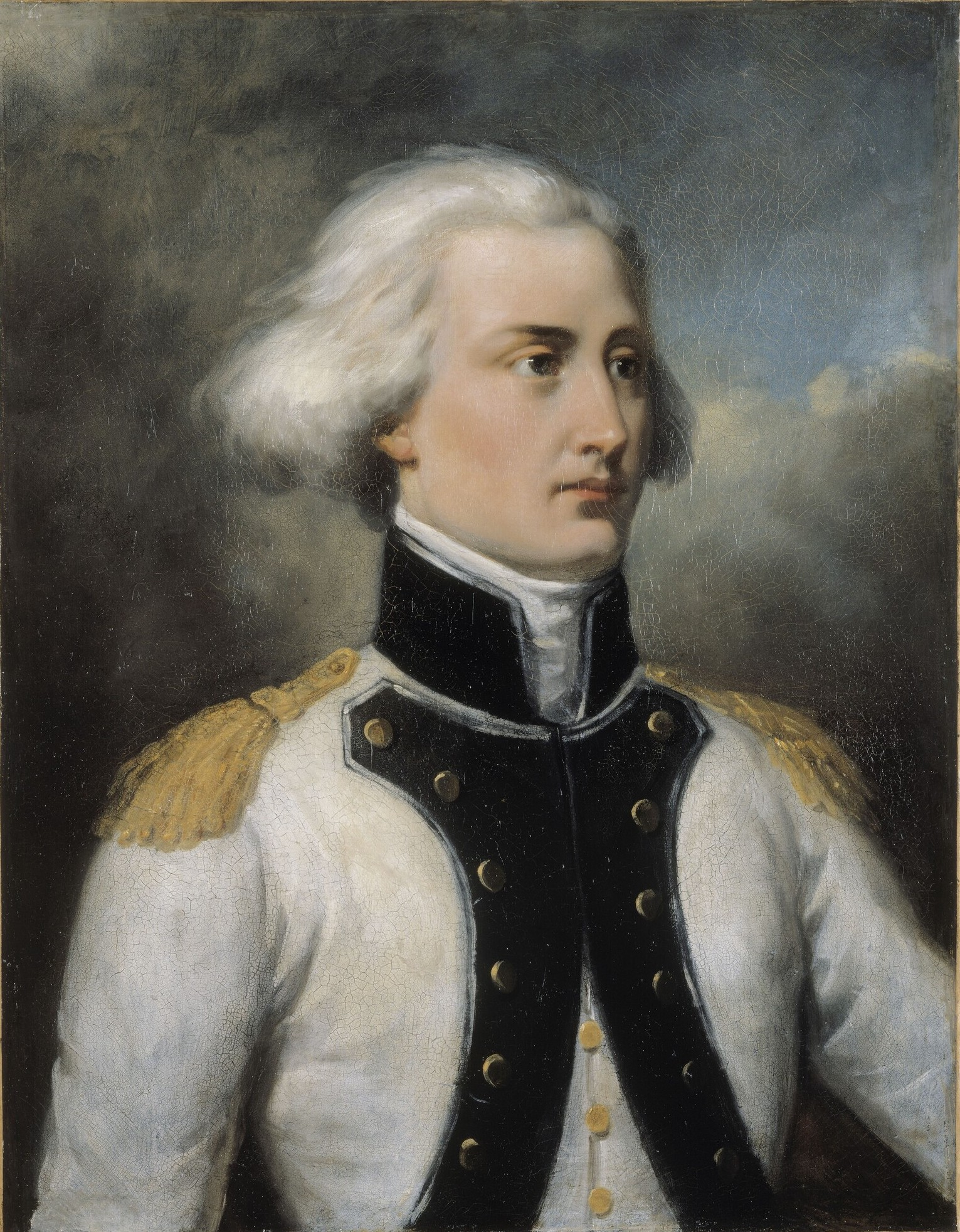
Bon-Adrien de Moncey sent Digonet to attack Mt. Arquinzu.

On 10 July 1794, Digonet led 4,000 troops in action at Monte Arquinzu. Bon-Adrien Jeannot de Moncey planned to surround the position, which was apparently his favorite tactic. Digonet was supposed to mount a frontal attack while a second column led by Théophile Corret de la Tour d'Auvergne cut off the enemy's retreat. In the event, Digonet attacked too soon but his adversaries were nevertheless beaten and forced to flee. The defenders included one battalion each of the Spanish Zamora Infantry Regiment and the French Émigré Royal Legion. The enemy suffered 314 casualties while their commander Claude-Anne de Rouvroy de Saint Simon was shot in the chest but survived and escaped. Not as lucky were 49 captured French Royalists who were executed according to the policy of the French Revolutionary government. The next major operation was the Battle of the Baztan Valley on 23 July followed by the seizure of Fuenterrabia on 1 August with 2,000 prisoners and 200 cannons. Moncey continued west to capture San Sebastián on 2 August, capturing another 1,700 Spanish troops and 90 artillery pieces. Digonet participated in all three combats.

The Army of the Western Pyrenees only contributed one Marshal to Napoleon's First French Empire and that was Moncey. For the most part, the army did not have very distinguished soldiers. Of the army's division commanders, only Henri François Delaborde had long service under Napoleon. The better-known officers were Digonet, Sextius Alexandre François de Miollis, Pierre Hugues Victoire Merle, Jean Maximilien Lamarque and Jean Isidore Harispe. Jean Castelbert de Castelverd fell into disgrace in 1796. After the Peace of Basel in 1795, the army was broken up and a column of 10,955 set out to join the Army of the West to fight the War in the Vendée.

Digonet was among those transferred to the Vendée. In the 1795–96 campaign, his troops defeated François de Charette's insurgents near Saint-Fulgent and forced them to flee. Later Charette was captured by Jean-Pierre Travot's troops. Digonet also beat Jean-Nicolas Stofflet's band. After Lazare Hoche pacified the rebellious regions he gave Digonet high praise in his report to the French government. In 1796–98, Digonet commanded the departments of Charente-Inférieure and Deux-Sèvres. In the subsequent Chouan revolt, he forced Louis-Auguste-Victor, Count de Ghaisnes de Bourmont's insurrectionists to abandon Le Mans and recaptured a large number of cannons after beating a second rebel group in the Sarthe department.

In 1800 Digonet was assigned to the Army of the Rhine under Jean Victor Marie Moreau and fought at the Battle of Stockach-Engen. Digonet and Pierre François Joseph Durutte were the two brigadiers in the division of Antoine Richepanse in the Army Reserve. The division was made up of the 4th, 50th and 100th Line Infantry Demi Brigades, the 13th Cavalry, 17th Dragoon and 5th Hussar Regiments and a combined grenadier battalion for a total of 6,848 foot and 1,187 horse. At the Battle of Messkirch on 5 May 1800, Moreau brought the Reserve into action late in the day. Austrian commander Paul Kray launched an attack that threatened to cut the Stockach road. Richepanse arrived on the battlefield and took Ignaz Gyulai's division in flank, driving it back. Kray gave up his effort to break down the French flank and retreated to the Danube at Sigmaringen. Digonet was present at the Battle of Biberach on 9 May. While Moreau took charge of the left wing, Laurent Gouvion Saint-Cyr took his own corps plus the Reserve and attacked the Austrians at Biberach an der Riss. The move was successful and the French captured the Austrian supply base in the city.

Digonet was reassigned to lead a brigade in Jean François Cornu de La Poype's division and sent to Italy via the Gotthard Pass. The divisions of La Poype and Jean Thomas Guillaume Lorge were part of Moncey's corps as of 24 May 1800. In December, Digonet led a brigade consisting of the 67th Line Infantry Demi Brigade and a unit of converged grenadiers in a division commanded by Donatien-Marie-Joseph de Vimeur, vicomte de Rochambeau. This was in Guillaume Brune's Army of Italy. During these operations, Digonet drove the Austrians from the town of Bormio in the Valtellina. In support of Brune's campaign, he and his brigade cleared 800 Tyrolese by surprise from two mountain passes on 23 December 1800 and entered Riva del Garda. Brune won the Battle of Pozzolo on 25 December 1800.

== Empire ==
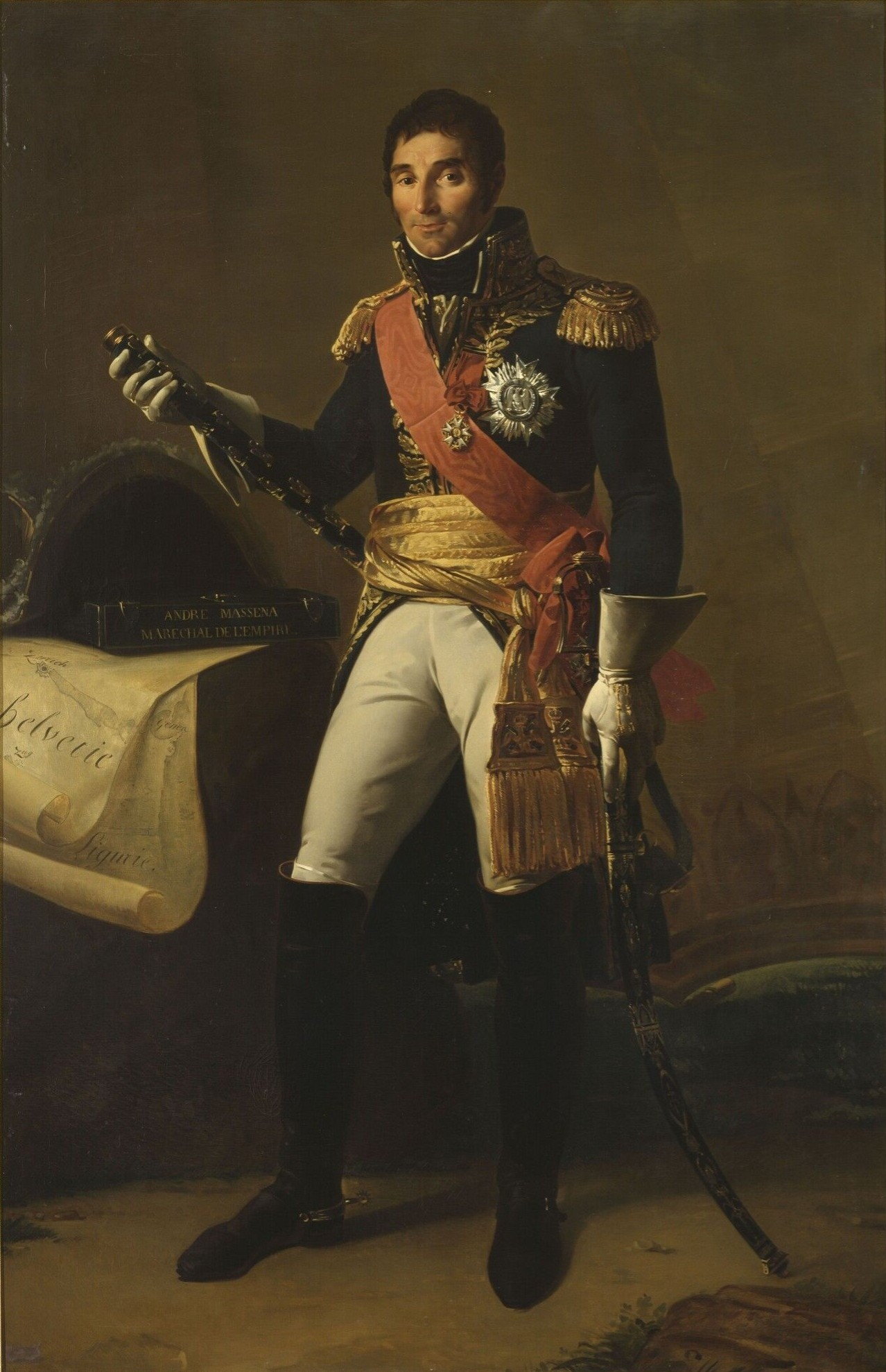
Digonet fought under André Masséna in 1805–06.

After Napoleon became emperor, Digonet was made a member of the Légion d'Honneur on 16 October 1803. He was made a commander of the Légion d'Honneur on 14 June 1804. In the War of the Third Coalition he was assigned to lead troops in André Masséna's Army of Italy. He commanded the 1st Brigade in Jean-Antoine Verdier's division, consisting of three battalions each of the 23rd Light and the 10th Line Infantry Regiments. In late October 1805, Masséna massed 23,400 foot, 700 horse and 72 guns on the east bank of the Adige River near Verona with Verdier's 6,600 foot and 1,000 horse on the west bank. The French were outnumbered by Archduke Charles, Duke of Teschen who had 44,000 infantry and 6,500 cavalry. Under orders from Napoleon to keep Charles occupied, Masséna determined to attack. While making a frontal assault with his east bank troops, the French general planned to have Verdier cross the Adige and attack the Austrian left flank. Complicating the situation, Paul Davidovich was downstream with 10,000 more Austrians.

In the Battle of Caldiero on 30 October, Verdier put one infantry regiment across the river, but when Davidovich made a threatening move, he was compelled to hold the bulk of his men on the west bank while the two armies fought a drawn battle. On the 31st, Verdier managed to get his entire division across the Adige and launched his attack around noon. Digonet's brigade on the right drove back a screen of Grenz infantry but was then counterattacked by Joseph Armand von Nordmann's division. Nordmann was wounded but his soldiers pushed Digonet's men back after a musketry duel. Verdier tried to send help from his left brigade, but that unit was beaten and compelled to retreat toward the river crossing site. Disaster loomed until a regiment of Chasseurs à Cheval charged the Austrians, keeping them from crushing Verdier's division. The combat ended at 5:00 PM that afternoon.

Digonet participated in the 1806 invasion of Naples. At the Battle of Maida on 4 July 1806, Digonet led a brigade in Jean Reynier's division. His command included two battalions of the 1,266-strong 23rd Light Infantry Regiment, 328 sabers of the 9th Chasseurs à Cheval Regiment and several artillery pieces manned by 112 gunners. Reynier's division attacked the British with brigades under Louis Fursy Henri Compère and Luigi Gaspare Peyri echeloned forward by the left. Compère's charge was met by devastating British musketry and dispersed with heavy losses. Many of Peyri's troops became involved in the rout though a Swiss battalion kept its order and rallied on Digonet's brigade. British brigades under Lowry Cole, Wroth Palmer Acland and John Oswald converged on Digonet's troops but were stopped when the 9th Chasseurs made a series of partial charges, forcing the British to deploy into squares. Finally, a newly arrived British regiment broke the stalemate by attacking from a new direction and Digonet conducted a retreat.

Digonet held a command in Italy in August 1809 during the War of the Fifth Coalition. Assigned to command at Modena, he was stricken with disease and died there on 17 March 1811, unmarried and childless.
