= Étienne Deprez-Crassier =

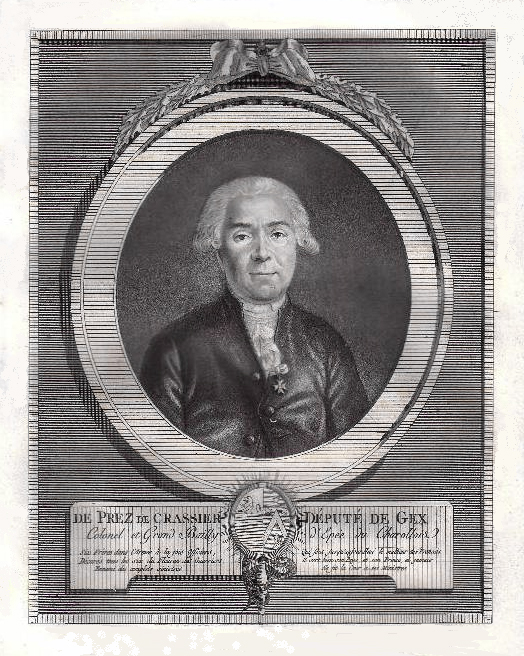
- Étienne Deprez-Crassier
- Born: 18 January 1733; Divonne-les-Bains, France
- Died: 6 July 1803 (aged 70) Ornex, Rhône-Alpes, France
- Allegiance: Kingdom of France; France
- Branch: Infantry
- Service years: (Kingdom of France) 1745–1787 (France) 1792–1796
- Rank: General of Division
- Conflicts: War of the Austrian Succession; Seven Years' War; Battle of Rossbach; Battle of Sondershausen; War of the First Coalition; Skirmish of Fontoy; Battle of Valmy; Battle of Biriatou

Jean Étienne Philibert de Prez de Crassier or Étienne Desprez-Crassier (18 January 1733 – 6 July 1803) was a French political and military leader in the early years of the French Revolutionary Wars. Despite being from the minor nobility, he entered the French Royal Army as a cadet at the age of 12 because of his family's poverty. He fought in the War of the Austrian Succession and the Seven Years' War, becoming a colonel in 1785 and retiring two years later. Voltaire lent him the money needed to recover the Deprez family property. He was elected to the Estates General as a nobleman in 1789. After being promoted to lieutenant general he led a division at Valmy in 1792. He became commander of the Army of the Rhine and Army of the Western Pyrenees. Imprisoned during the Reign of Terror, he was released and restored to his former rank but retired in 1796.

== Career ==
Deprez-Crassier was promoted maréchal de camp (brigadier general) on 1 March 1791. While leading 600 troops, he fought a skirmish with the Prussians at Fontoy on 19 August 1792. His detachment consisted of two companies of grenadiers and five squadrons of Chasseurs à Cheval. His soldiers encountered a superior force of five squadrons of the Wolffradt Hussar Regiment and were defeated with a loss of 200 killed and wounded plus 24 men captured. Nevertheless, he was promoted to lieutenant general on 5 September 1792.

During the Battle of Valmy on 20 September 1792 Deprez-Crassier led a detachment in François Christophe Kellermann's Army of the Centre. Under his command were the 1st Battalion of the 1st Line Infantry Regiment, one grenadier battalion, three squadrons each of the 3rd Hussar and 1st Chasseurs à Cheval Regiments and two squadrons of the 4th Dragoon Regiment. The day before the battle Kellermann sent the Advance Guard under Deprez-Crassier forward from his camp at Dommartin-la-Planchette toward Somme-Bionne. At his position at the La Lune tavern, Deprez-Crassier was joined the next morning by the Reserve under Jean-Baptiste Cyrus de Valence. As the Prussians advanced on his position Kellermann decided to move his main force to the mound of Valmy under cover of a morning fog and the forces of Deprez-Crassier and Valence. During this time three squadrons of Prussian hussars blundered into the covering force and were repulsed. As the Prussians brought up their artillery to fire on the La Lune position, Kellermann established his defensive lines at Valmy. Coming under fire, Deprez-Crassier and Valence fell back to take post near the hamlet of Orbeval on the left of the main position at Valmy. At this time Charles François Dumouriez sent forward nine battalions from the Army of the North to reinforce Kellermann's left flank, 16 battalions to buttress his right and another 12 battalions and six squadrons to form a reserve. When the fog lifted the Prussian generals were surprised to see the French army arrayed in great strength before them. The famous artillery duel followed, after which the Prussian commander Charles William Ferdinand, Duke of Brunswick-Wolfenbüttel declined to press home the attack.

== Notes ==
Military offices
Preceded by François Christophe Kellermann	Interim Commander-in-chief of the Army of the Moselle; 8 – 27 November 1792	Succeeded by Pierre de Ruel, marquis de Beurnonville
Preceded by Armand Louis de Gontaut	Interim Commander-in-chief of the Army of the Rhine; 26 December 1792 – 14 March 1793	Succeeded by Adam Philippe, Comte de Custine
Preceded by Pierre Joseph du Chambge D'Elbhecq	Commander-in-chief of the Army of the Western Pyrenees; 1 September – 4 October 1793	Succeeded by Jacques Léonard Muller
