= Orbaizeta =

Town in Navarre, Spain

Coordinates: 42°58′28″N 1°13′46″W

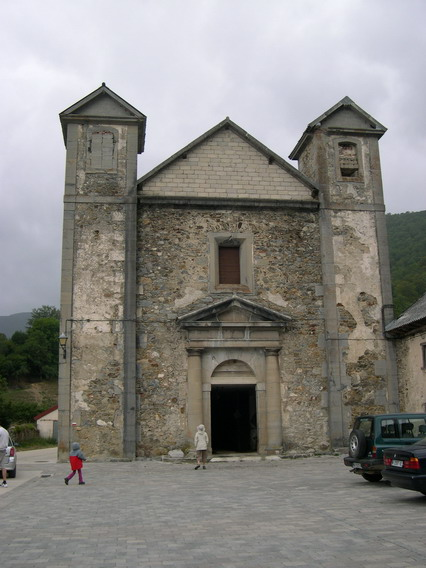
Old church in Orbaizeta

Orbaizeta is a town and municipality located in the province and autonomous community of Navarre, northern Spain.

== History ==
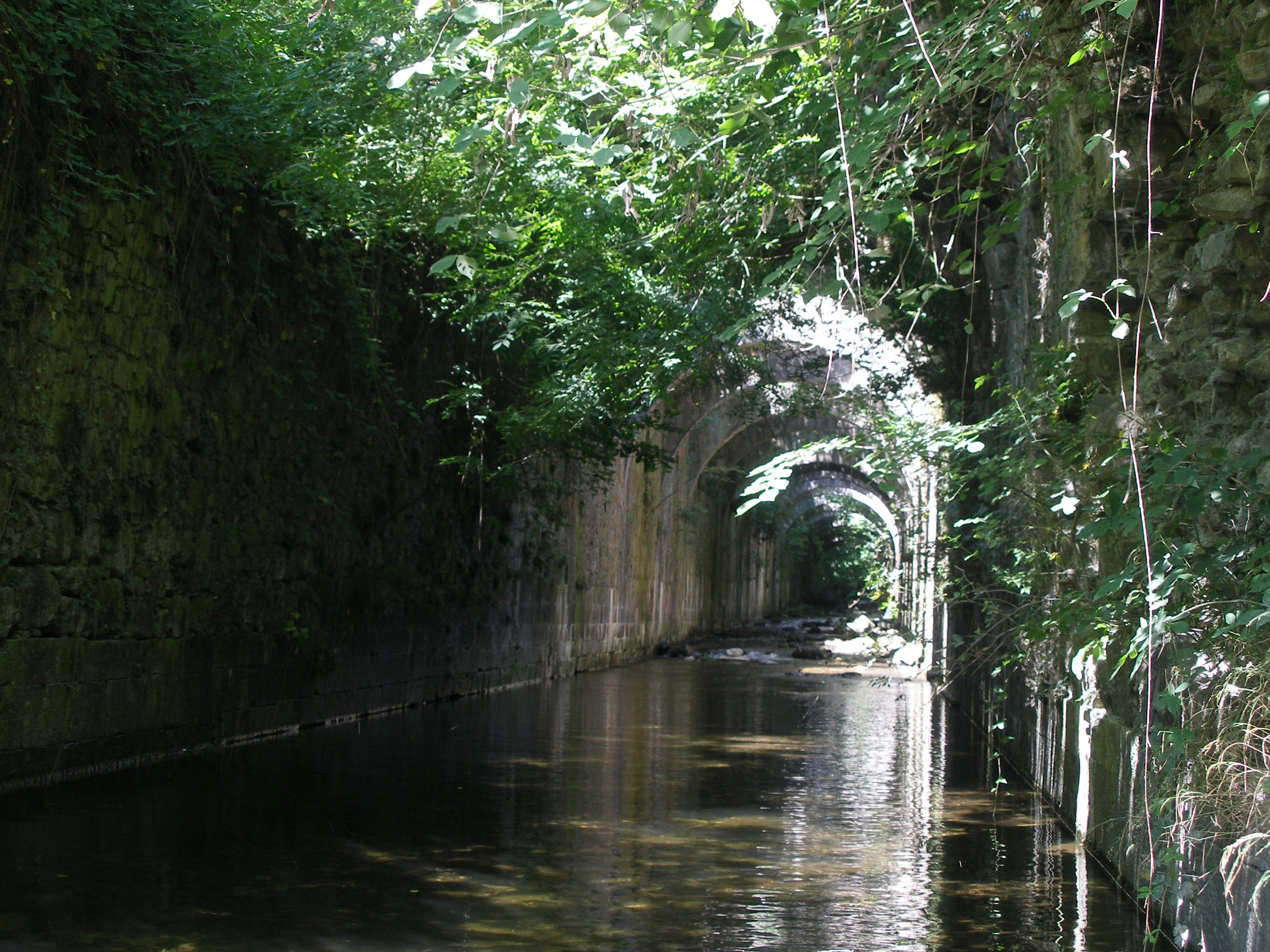
The builders of the Orbaizeta foundry channeled the Rio Irati underneath.

On 15–17 October 1794, the Battle of Orbaizeta was fought in the area. General Bon-Adrien Jeannot de Moncey led the French Army of the western Pyrenees to victory over General Pedro Téllez-Girón, 9th Duke of Osuna, who commanded the Spanish army. During the fighting, the French army seized the cannon foundry located four km north of the town.
