= Jacques Léonard Muller =

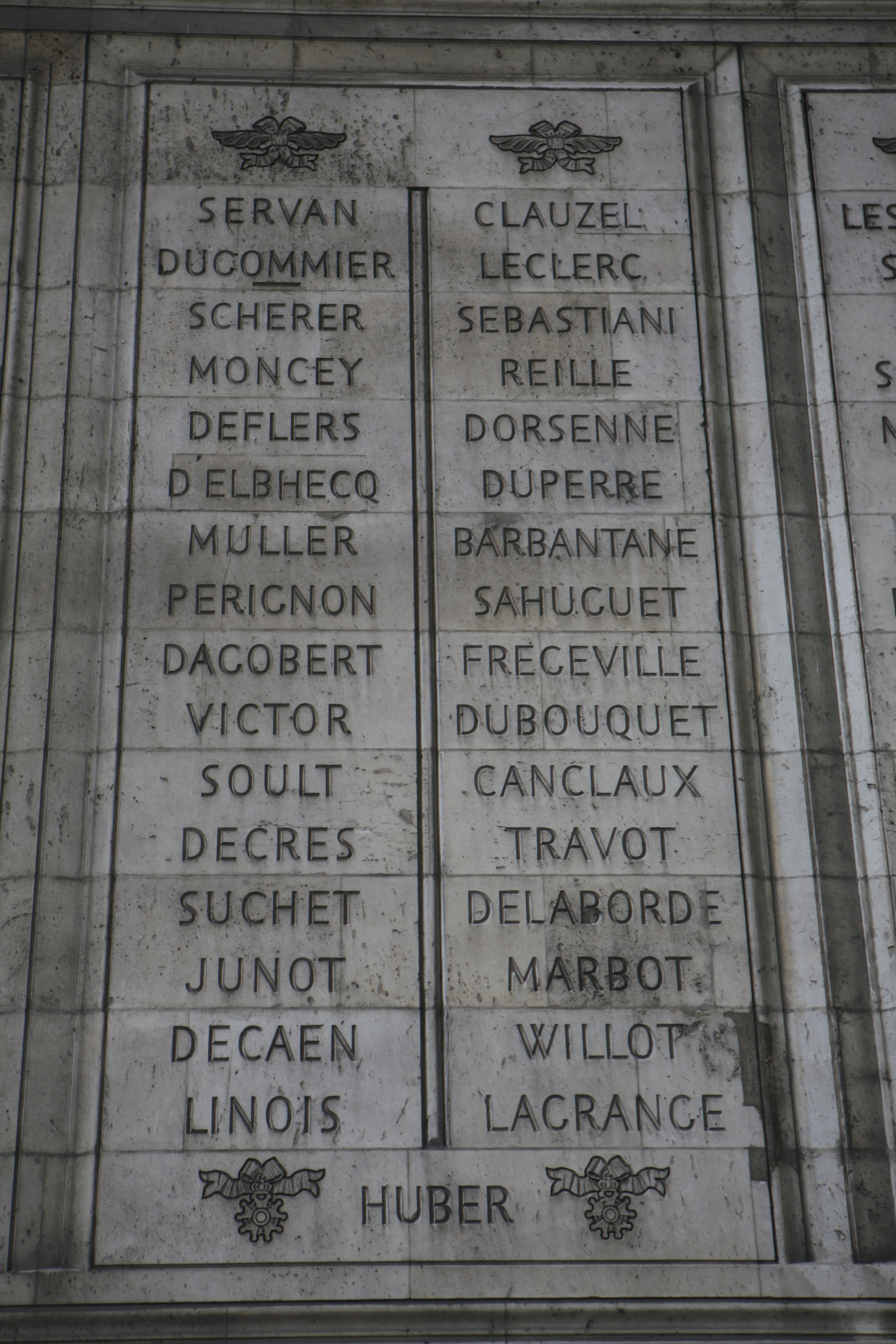
- Muller is at the seventh row in the middle of Column 33
- Born: 11 December 1749; Thionville, France
- Died: 1 October 1824 (aged 74) Saintes, Charente-Maritime, France
- Allegiance: France
- Branch: Infantry
- Service years: 1765–1814
- Rank: General of Division
- Commands: Army of the Western Pyrenees; Army of the Rhine
- Conflicts: War of the First Coalition; Battle of Jemappes; War of the Pyrenees; Battle of the Baztan; War of the Second Coalition; Battle of Mannheim
- Awards: Order of Saint Louis, 1791; Légion d'Honneur, CC, 1804
- Other work: Baron of the Empire, 1810

Jacques Léonard Muller (11 December 1749 – 1 October 1824) commanded the Army of the Western Pyrenees and the Army of the Rhine during the French Revolutionary Wars. He was a product of the French Royal Army which he joined in 1765. He became a captain in 1791 and soon formed a unit from the disbanded Swiss regiments of the old army. He fought at Jemappes and then transferred to the War Office. Promoted to general officer in July 1793 he was appointed chief of staff to the Army of the Pyrenees. In October 1793 he assumed command of that army despite being outranked by ten other generals. He immediately set about providing a good organization for his motley host. A major Spanish attack on the Sans Culottes Camp was repulsed in February 1794.

Muller was finally promoted to general of division in April 1794. In July and August his army captured the Baztan Valley and San Sebastián. He soon resigned his command and was replaced by Bon-Adrien Jeannot de Moncey. He transferred to the Army of the Alps as a division commander. In 1799 while he led the Army of the Rhine, he was beaten at Mannheim but he successfully lured the Austrians away from Switzerland. He served in various non-combat posts during the Napoleonic Wars and died in 1824. His surname is one of the names inscribed under the Arc de Triomphe, on Column 33.

Military offices
Preceded by Étienne Deprez-Crassier	Commander-in-chief of the Army of the Western Pyrenees; 5 October 1793–30 August 1794	Succeeded by Bon-Adrien Jeannot de Moncey
Preceded by Part of the Army of the Danube	Commander-in-chief of the Army of the Rhine; 15 July–24 September 1799	Succeeded by Michel Ney
