= Battle of Mannheim (1799) =

- Part of War of the Second Coalition
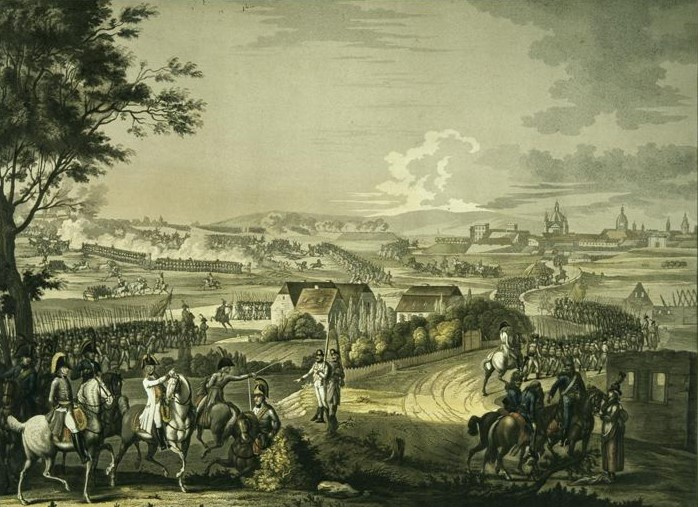
- The Surprise of Mannheim, 18 September 1799 by Johann Lorenz Rugendas
Date	18 September 1799
Location	Mannheim, Germany 49°29′20″N 8°28′9″E
Result	Austrian victory

Belligerents
(Habsburg monarchy) Austria	France

Commanders and leaders
(Habsburg monarchy) Archduke Charles	(France) Jacques Muller (France) Antoine Laroche (France) Michel Ney (WIA)

Strength
18,000–22,000	5,200

Casualties and losses
1,300	3,500, 23 guns, 2 colors

War of the Second Coalition:
Austria
The color black indicates the current battle.

The Battle of Mannheim (18 September 1799) was fought between an Austrian army commanded by Archduke Charles, Duke of Teschen and a French army under Jacques Léonard Muller. Most of the French Army of the Rhine had retreated to the west bank of the Rhine River, leaving the division of Antoine Laroche-Dubouscat to hold Mannheim on the east bank. Despite assistance by Michel Ney, Laroche's division was beaten and driven out of the city when attacked by Charles and a much superior force. The War of the Second Coalition action occurred in the city of Mannheim, today located in the state of Baden-Württemberg in southwest Germany about 80 kilometres (50 mi) south of Frankfurt.

In the summer of 1799, Muller's 18,000-man army had the mission of drawing Charles' Austrian army away from Switzerland, the central and western portions of which were held by André Masséna's army. Moving south from Mannheim, the Army of the Rhine laid siege to Philippsburg. Provoked by this threat to his strategic rear, Charles and 30,000 troops moved north against Muller, who quickly withdrew. Muller erred in leaving Laroche to be mauled by Charles, but his campaign became a strategic success when Masséna severely defeated a Russian army at the Second Battle of Zurich on 25 and 26 September.

== Background ==
On 4 June 1799, the First Battle of Zurich was fought between André Masséna's 45,000-strong Army of the Danube and a 53,000-man Austrian army led by Archduke Charles, Duke of Teschen. Austrian casualties numbered 2,400 and eight guns while the French lost 4,400 men and 28 guns. Though the French held their ground, Masséna evacuated Zürich the next day and withdrew to a strong position overlooking the city. Altogether, Masséna commanded 76,781 troops. In Switzerland were infantry divisions under Claude Lecourbe (1st), Joseph Chabran (2nd), Jean-de-Dieu Soult (3rd), Jean Thomas Guillaume Lorge (4th), Jean Victor Tharreau (5th), François Goullus (6th), Joseph Souham (7th) and Louis Marie Turreau (Valais), a cavalry division under Louis Klein and an infantry reserve under Jean Joseph Amable Humbert, plus occupation troops. The 6th and 7th Divisions were supervised by Pierre Marie Barthélemy Ferino while Lecourbe controlled the 1st and 2nd. Included in Masséna's command were Claude Juste Alexandre Legrand with 6,186 men and Claude-Sylvestre Colaud with 5,106 men watching the Rhine north of Strasbourg. Opposed to the French were 85,000 troops led by Charles, including a force watching the French divisions on the Rhine to the north and eight battalions under Gottfried von Strauch near the Saint Gotthard Pass in the south.

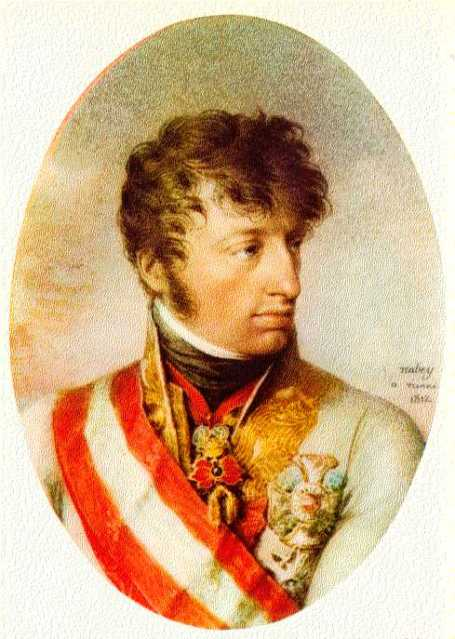
Archduke Charles

The Army of the Rhine was formed on 5 July 1799 by Jean Baptiste Bernadotte, who was the Minister of War. The army was responsible for an area along the Rhine River from Neuf-Brisach on the south to Düsseldorf on the north, including the fortresses of Breisach, Kehl, Strasbourg, Landau, Mannheim, Mainz, Ehrenbreitstein and Luxembourg. The French reported the strength of the army as 40,000 to 60,000 men, but this was a ruse to trick the Austrians. In fact, much of the army's strength was tied up in garrisons and it is unlikely that the number of troops available for field operations exceeded 18,000. The purpose of the Army of the Rhine was to lure the Austrian army away from Masséna. This could be achieved by menacing Archduke Charles' supply line, which ran northeast from Switzerland to Ulm on the Danube River. The army was too weak to fight the Austrians in a pitched battle, but it was enough of a threat that it could not be ignored.

Meanwhile, an Austro-Russian army under Alexander Suvorov had expelled the French from most of Italy. In the Battle of Novi on 15 August 1799, the Allies suffered 8,200 casualties, mostly Austrian, but chased the French army back into its last narrow slice of Italian territory near Genoa. During this time, the Austrians were very successful in reducing the French-held fortresses in Italy. By 11 September, the only Piedmont fortress that remained in French hands was Cuneo.

At this time there was a major change in Allied strategy which apparently originated with William Grenville, 1st Baron Grenville, the British foreign minister. According to the plan, Suvorov was to march north into Switzerland with 20,000 Russians to join 45,000 newly arrived Russians under Alexander Korsakov near Zürich. These soldiers would be assisted by 18,000 Austrians led by Friedrich Freiherr von Hotze. Meanwhile, the British agent William Wickham would raise an army of 20,000 Swiss. The mostly-Russian force was supposed to invade France across the Jura Mountains. As soon as Korsakov's army was situated, Charles was to move north into southern Germany with 60,000 Austrians and invade France across the upper Rhine. Tsar Paul I of Russia and Francis II, Holy Roman Emperor approved this plan and issued the necessary orders which arrived at Charles' headquarters on 7 August. In fact, the archduke was reluctant to carry out the plan, since he believed that splitting up the Coalition armies was a mistake. In the end, bad timing ruined the new scheme; Charles would leave Switzerland too early and Suvorov would arrive in Switzerland too late.

However, Archduke Charles was not quite finished with Switzerland. The Austrian general tried to gain a bridgehead across the Aare River at Döttingen. Success here would drive a wedge between Masséna's left wing and his center, compelling the French commander to withdraw from his position facing Zürich. On the morning of 17 August, Charles massed 35,000 troops and battery of 40 cannons opposite his intended crossing place. The Austrians were favored by good luck because Masséna was visiting his right wing that day and the defending 5th Division was under a temporary commander, Étienne Heudelet de Bierre. Also, there was an early fog to hide the bridge builders from French view. As it happened, Michel Ney was nearby and by noon he and Heudelet assembled 12,000 men in the vicinity. The Austrian engineers blundered by selecting a poor site for their bridge and there was no covering force to protect the crews from French snipers. By 6:30 pm the effort failed and the Austrians asked for a truce so they could take up their bridge, which Ney granted. On 22 August, Ney transferred to the Army of the Rhine.

== Campaign and Battle ==
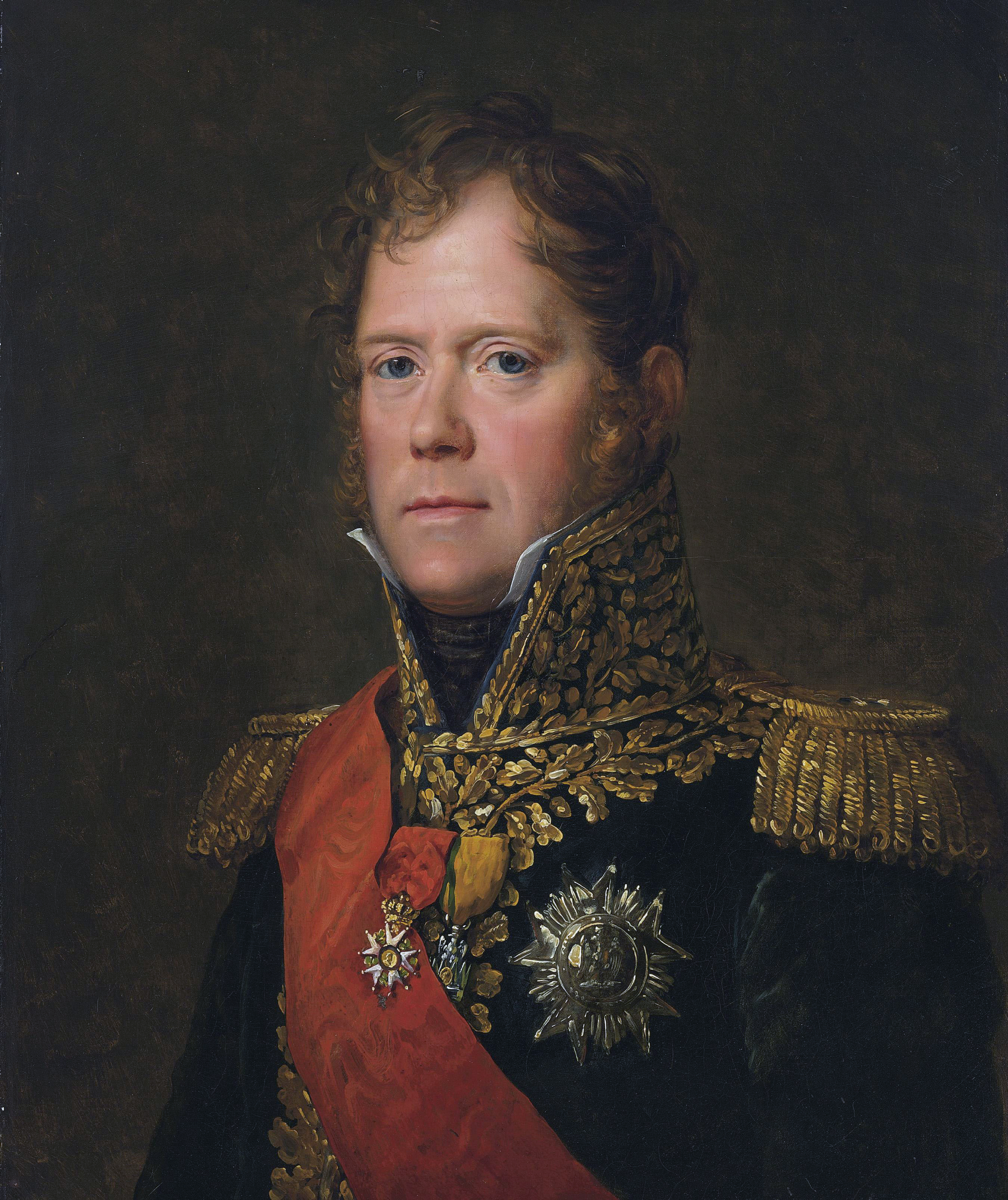
Marshal Michel Ney

At the end of August 1799, Army of the Rhine was organized into three infantry divisions under Colaud, Antoine Laroche-Dubouscat and Jean François Leval and a cavalry reserve led by Jean-Joseph Ange d'Hautpoul. On 24 August a review was ordered at Oggersheim but it rained and the troops got drenched instead. It was rumored that the review was a cover for Muller's chief of staff Louis Baraguey d'Hilliers to carry out on a raid to Frankfurt in order to mulct the city for funds. The 6,000 troops allotted to this mission were drawn from all the infantry divisions. Hilliers would rejoin the army at Heidelberg. On the 25th Ney came to the army as a freshly-minted general of division. Muller created an advance guard of 1,400 infantry, 200 cavalry and three field pieces for Ney.

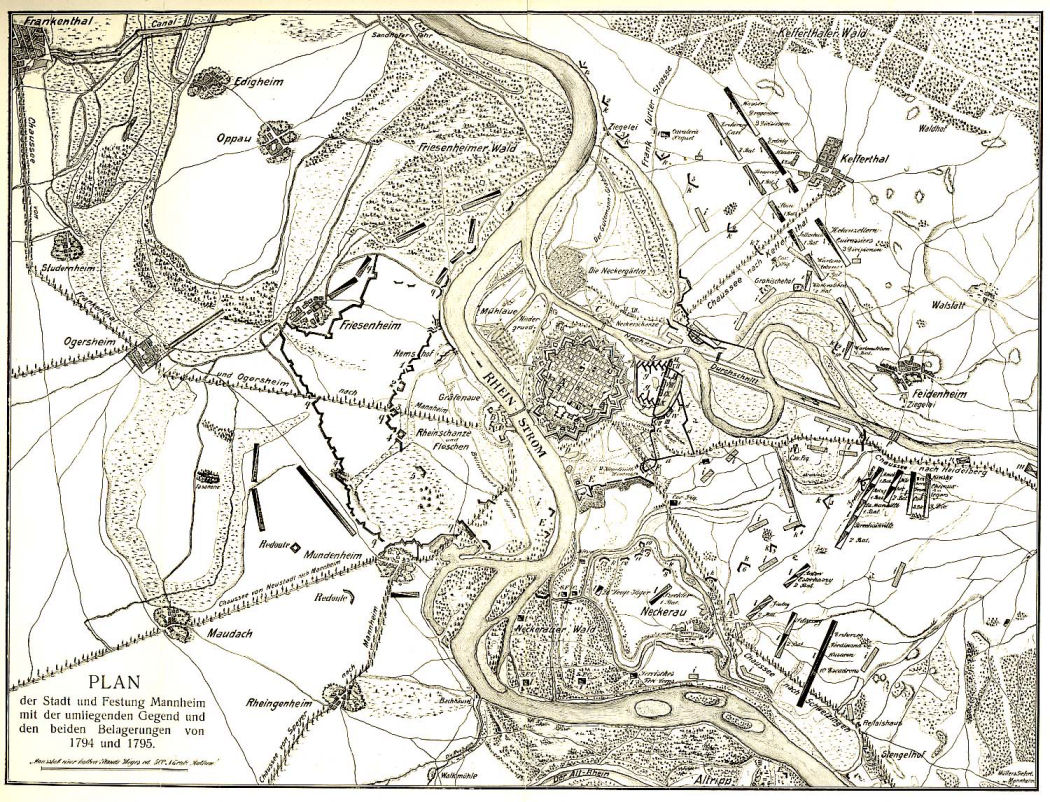
Map of Mannheim and vicinity showing the siege works of 1795

On 26 August 1799, Muller's 18,000-strong army moved out with Leval's division marching south through Schwetzingen, Colaud occupying Wiesloch and Sinsheim, Laroche on Colaud's left and Hautpoul bringing up the rear. Ney was reinforced by a cavalry regiment and sent out ahead up the Neckar River valley where he seized Heilbronn on 29 August and Lauffen am Neckar on the 30th. A false report caused the army to retreat on 1 September, but the advance soon resumed. Ney's patrols reached Ludwigsburg. Leval's division invested Philippsburg and its 2,239-man garrison. The French threatened to burn down the town unless it surrendered, but its governor Count Salm refused, saying if his enemies captured the town all they would get would be its ashes. The bombardment started on 6 September. The French were also opposed by an Austrian force led by Anton Sztáray which was supplemented by a local militia that its commander Count Albini styled the "German National Guard". These partisans later managed to recapture Frankfurt.

Archduke Charles was loath to get too far from Masséna and hovered near Donaueschingen for a while. However, the Austrian general began to move north when Philippsburg was attacked. On 5 September reports came in from Hautpoul's cavalry and infantry brigadier Charles Mathieu Isidore Decaen that Charles was coming closer. Though Philippsburg had only been under siege for a few days, the French inflicted 94 casualties on the garrison of Philippsburg and caused serious damage to its defenses. Nevertheless, Muller abandoned the siege and began falling back on Mannheim. By 13 September, most of the Army of the Rhine was safely on the west bank of the Rhine. Leval's division covered the northern stretch between Worms and Koblenz, Colaud was south near Speyer and Ney defended the river between them with a newly formed division composed of six elite companies, one infantry regiment and three cavalry regiments.

In a remarkable mistake, Muller left Laroche's division at Mannheim on the east bank. Laroche understood very well that his division was badly exposed. He would have liked to defend the position of Neckerau but it had no bridge, while Mannheim had a bridge. He finally turned to Ney for advice, who suggested moving the bridge to Neckerau. On 18 September, Charles with 22,000 troops assaulted Laroche who had only 5,200 soldiers. Even so, the French resisted stoutly. Ney brought some of his troops to help, but the Austrians overran Neckerau on Laroche's right and drove for the bridge. In the end, the Austrians almost managed to cross to the west bank by the bridge, but were finally stopped.

According to another source, the archduke had 18,000 soldiers available. The regular foot soldiers forming the Austrian force included the Bojakowsky, Fitz-Gibbons, Rüffer, Sebottendorf and Tegetthof Grenadier battalions, three battalions each of Infantry Regiments Archduke Ferdinand Nr. 2, Archduke Charles Nr. 3 and Oliver Wallis Nr. 29 and two companies of Carl Schröder Nr. 7. The Grenz Infantry contingent was made up of the 1st and 2nd Battalions of Broder Nr. 7 and the 1st Battalion of Deutsch-Banater Nr. 12. The cavalry consisted of six squadrons each of the Kaiser Cuirassier Nr. 1, Lothringen Cuirassier Nr. 7, Anspach Dragoon Nr. 11, Kinsky Dragoon Nr. 12 and Vécsey Hussar Nr. 4 Regiments.

== Results ==
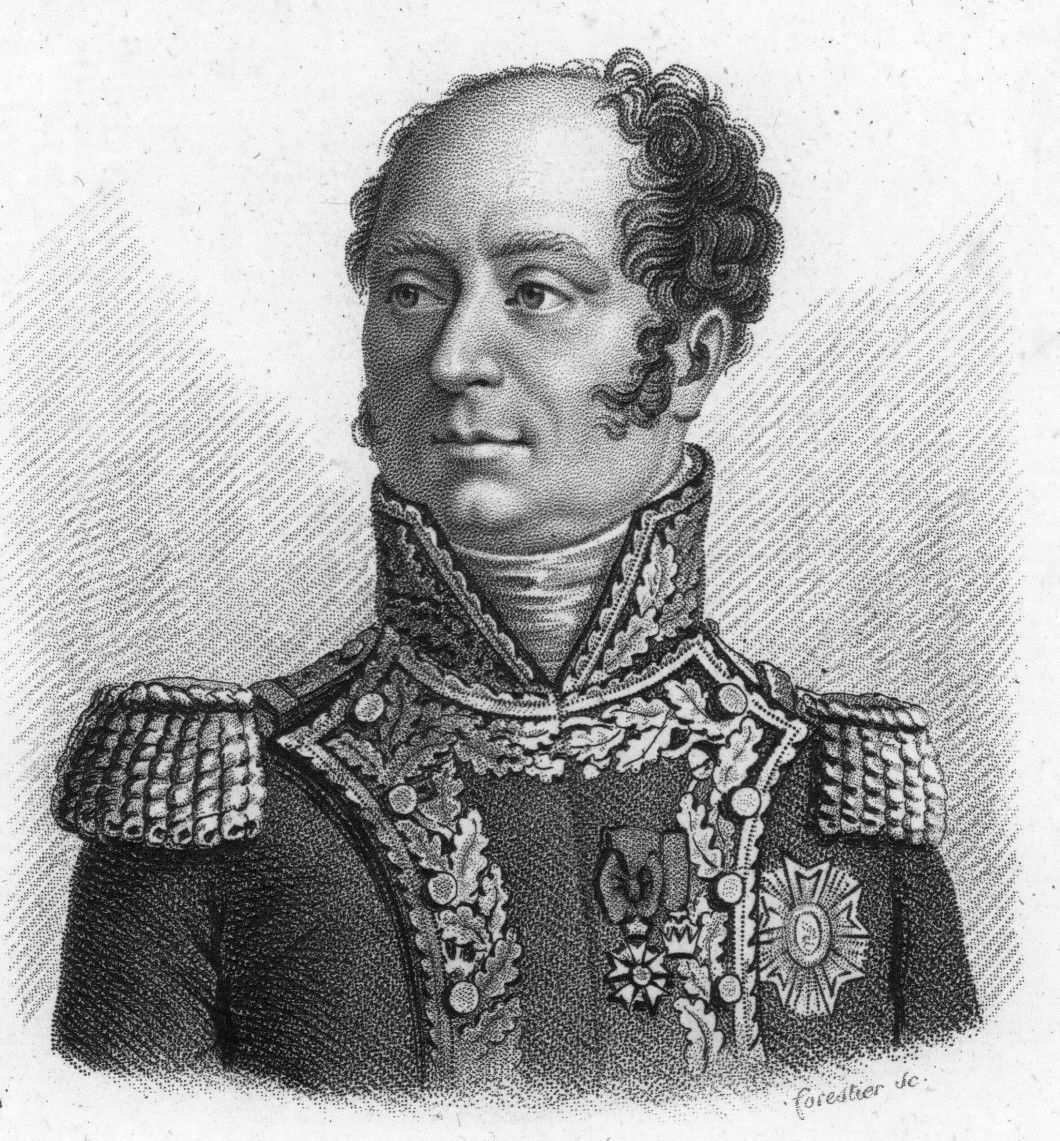
Louis Baraguey d'Hilliers

At Mannheim, the French sustained losses of 1,600 killed and wounded, while their enemies captured 1,900 soldiers, 23 artillery pieces, 20 vehicles and two colors. Austrian casualties numbered 1,300 killed, wounded and missing. Ney was bruised in two places, by a case shot on his left leg and by a musket ball in the chest. Laroche's division was nearly destroyed. Recriminations soon followed. Hilliers wrote to Bernadotte blaming Muller for retreating without a pitched battle. Decaen was another critic of Muller for advancing too slowly. Both Ney and Laroche were "disgusted" at having been left in the lurch. In fact, Muller's 18,000 were considerably outnumbered by Charles' 30,000 or more and it would have been foolish to risk battle. Muller successfully fulfilled his mission as a decoy in drawing Charles away from Switzerland.

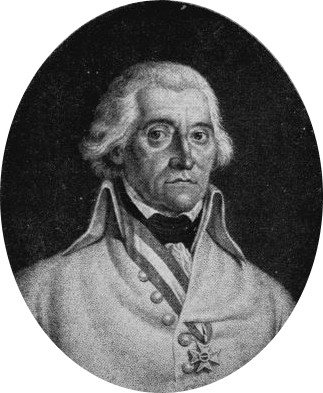
Friedrich von Hotze

Korsakov left Russia in May 1799 and arrived at Zürich with 29,463 men and 60 guns. The Russians irritated their allies by boasting that where the Austrians posted one battalion, they only needed one company. On Korsakov's right was Friedrich Joseph, Count of Nauendorf with 5,400 Austrians near Basel while Hotze was on his left with 23,000 Austrians holding the line of the Linth River. On Hotze's left was Franz Jellacic with a force near Chur. Seeing Charles move away from Switzerland, Masséna prepared to strike with 49,098 troops.

On 25 September, Masséna defeated Korsakov in the Second Battle of Zurich. The French suffered 4,000 casualties but inflicted losses of 6,000 killed and wounded on the Russians. The French also seized 2,000 prisoners, 26 guns, 407 wagons and 10 colors. On the same day, Soult launched a surprise crossing the Linth River and defeated Hotze who was killed. Soult's force sustained 1,100 casualties while capturing 3,500 Austrians and allied Swiss, 20 guns, 33 munition wagons, two colors and many supplies. By the end of the day, the Russians had been driven back into Zürich. When news arrived of Hotze's defeat and death, Korsakov panicked and ordered a retreat to the north the next day. Hotze's successor Franz Petrasch also abandoned the area between Lake Zurich and the Rhine.

On 24 September Suvorov's column seized the Saint Gotthard Pass from Lecourbe's troops and entered Switzerland from the south. As soon as he disposed of Korsakov and Petrasch, Masséna turned to deal with Suvorov. After a remarkable campaign in the Alps, followed by a harrowing march across Panix Pass in which some of the survivors were "spitting blood", Suvorov's Russian army escaped the French. On 21 September, 21,285 Russians began the campaign and by 8 October their reported losses were 3,884. Since several units never submitted returns, the actual losses were probably closer to 4,400.

Unhappy with Muller, the French government appointed Lecourbe the new commander of the Army of the Rhine on 25 September 1799. Since Lecourbe was fighting Suvorov at the time, Massena did not release him until early October. Muller desired to get away from the army, so the temporary command was offered to the senior general Colaud, who refused it. Finally, Ney reluctantly accepted the acting command.
