= Donamaria =

Town in Navarre, Spain

Coordinates: 43°07′N 1°40′W

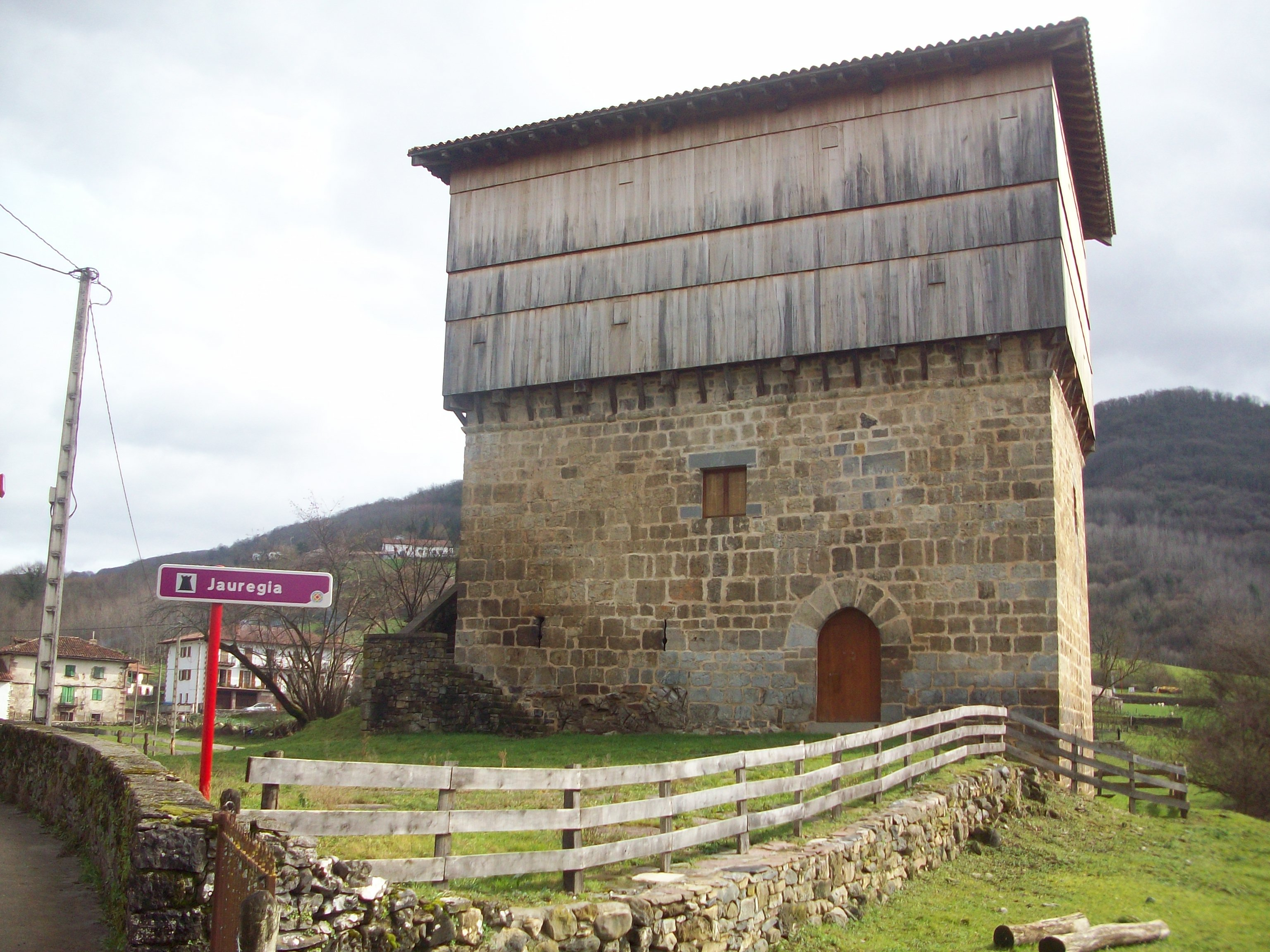
Jauregia tower house in the municipality of Donamaria in Malerreka. Navarre, Basque Country.

Donamaria is a town and municipality located in the province and autonomous community of Navarre in northern Spain.
