= Doneztebe-Santesteban =

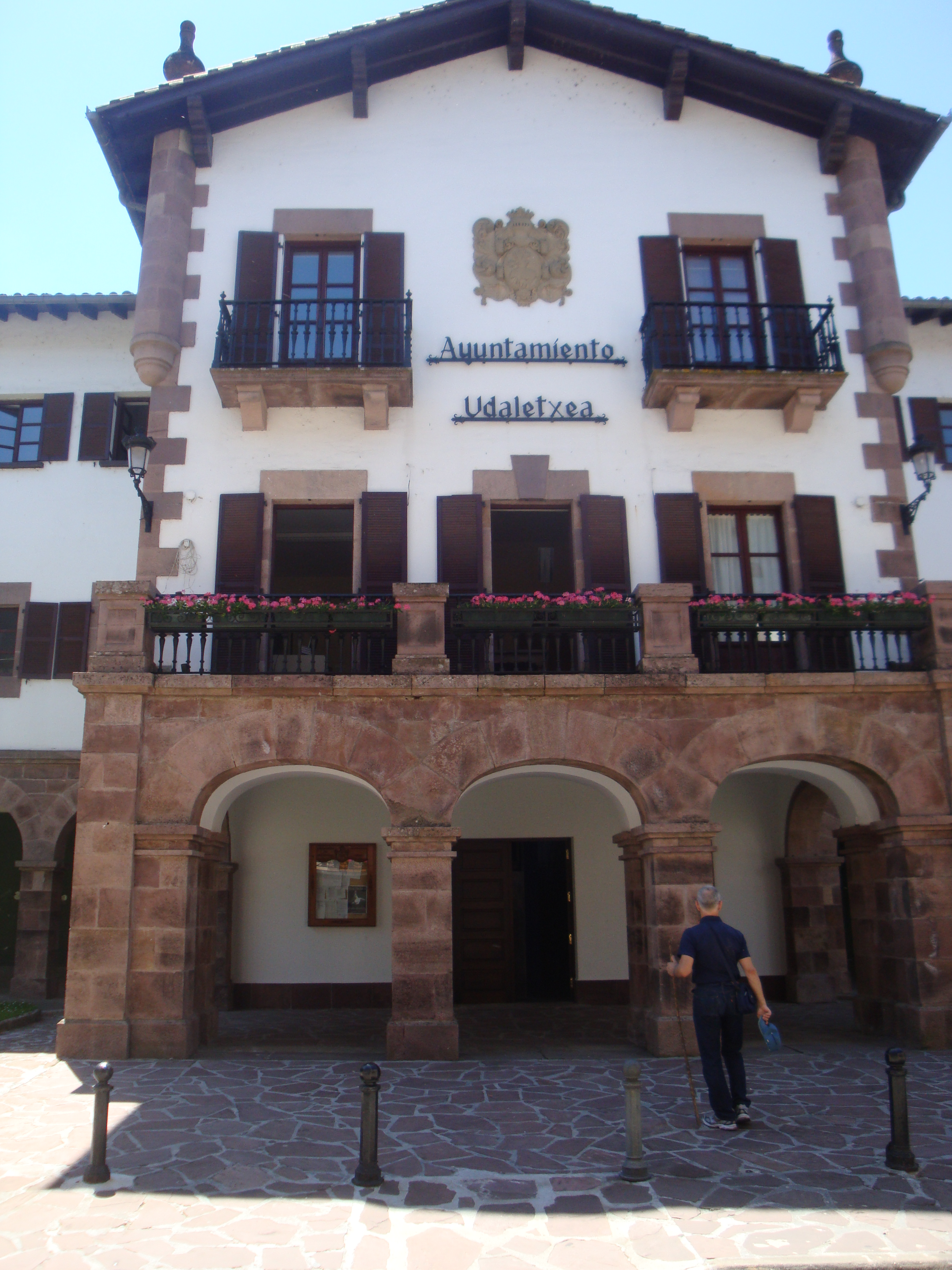
- Town hall

- Coat of arms

- Location of Doneztebe-Santesteban within Navarre Location of Doneztebe-Santesteban within Spain
- Coordinates: 43°07′54″N 1°40′11″W
- Country: Spain
- Autonomous community: Navarra

Area
  - Total: 9 km^{2} (3.5 sq mi)
- Elevation: 121 m (397 ft)

Population (2025-01-01)
  - Total: 1,854
  - Density: 210/km^{2} (530/sq mi)
- Time zone: UTC+1 (CET)
  - Summer (DST): UTC+2 (CEST)
- Postal code: 31740

Doneztebe-Santesteban is a town and municipality located in the province and autonomous community of Navarre, northern Spain.
