= Battle of Sans Culottes Camp =

Battle of the War of the First Coalition

Coordinates: 43°21′47″N 1°41′56″W

- Part of War of the Pyrenees
Date	5 February 1794
Location	Urrugne, France
Result	French victory

Belligerents
France	Spain

Commanders and leaders
(France) Jean de Frégeville (France) Augustin Lespinasse	(Spain) Ventura Caro (Spain) José de Urrutia

Units involved
Army of the Western Pyrenees	Army of Navarre and Guipuzcoa

Strength
Unknown	13,000

Casualties and losses
235	335

The Battle of Sans Culottes Camp (5 February 1794) saw a Spanish army commanded by José de Urrutia y de las Casas attack part of the French Army of the Western Pyrenees under Jean-Henri-Guy-Nicolas de Frégeville. The Spanish assault seized two key positions behind the Bidasoa River but was unable to overrun the main position, called Sans Culottes Camp after an eight-hour contest. The War of the Pyrenees action was fought at a location described as being "in front" of (that is, west of) Saint-Jean-de-Luz near the modern France–Spain border.

Ventura Caro had 20,000 troops in the Spanish Army of the West Pyrenees. He ordered his left wing near Irun and center in the Baztan Valley to attack the French camps behind the Bidasoa. French army artillery chief Augustin de Lespinasse gave up the outlying fortifications in order to concentrate his strength in the main camp. By the time Frégeville arrived on the scene, the Spanish attack had lost its momentum. Bon-Adrien Jeannot de Moncey, later a Marshal of France under Napoleon, was promoted to general of brigade for his distinguished actions during the battle.
