= Henri François Delaborde =

French general

Henri-François Delaborde
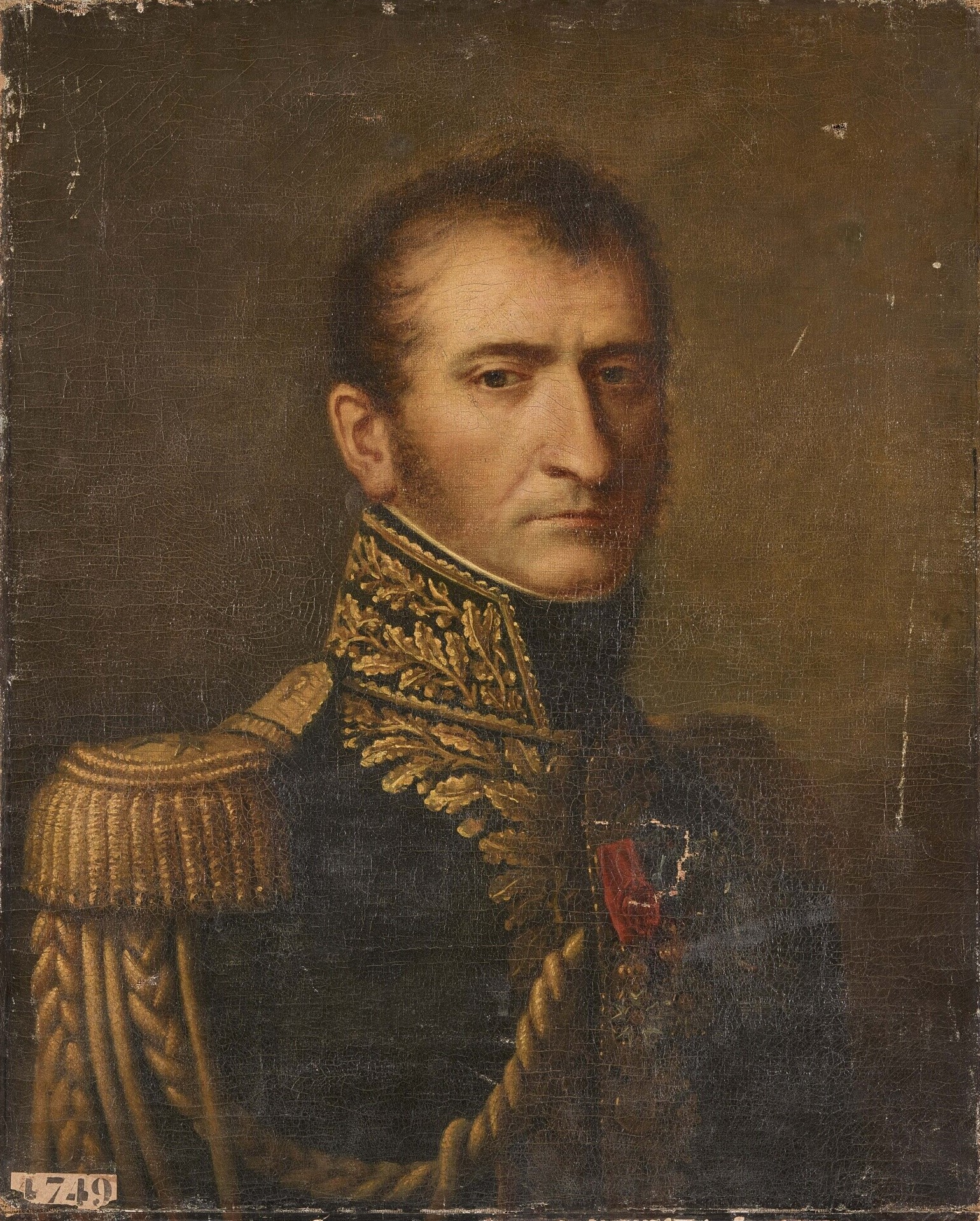
- Portrait by Jean-Antoine Pinchon, 1812
- Born: 21 December 1764; Dijon, Kingdom of France
- Died: 3 February 1833 (aged 68); Paris, France
- Military career
- Allegiance: Kingdom of France; French First Republic; First French Empire; Bourbon Restoration
- Service years: 1783–?
- Rank: General of division
- Commands: French Army
- Conflicts: French Revolutionary Wars; Siege of Toulon; War of the Pyrenees; Battle of the Baztan Valley; Battle of Orbaitzeta; Napoleonic Wars; Peninsular War; Invasion of Portugal; Battle of Roliça; Battle of Vimeiro; Battle of Corunna; Battle of Braga; First Battle of Porto; Second Battle of Porto; Invasion of Russia; Hundred Days
- Awards: Legion of Honour; Order of the Reunion; Order of Saint Louis

Henri-François Delaborde (French pronunciation: [ɑ̃ʁi fʁɑ̃swa dəlabɔʁd]; 21 December 1764 – 3 February 1833) was a French general in the French Revolutionary Wars and Napoleonic Wars.

== Early career ==
He was the son of a baker of Dijon. In 1783, Delaborde joined the Regiment of Condé Dragoons as a private. At the outbreak of the French Revolution he joined the 1st Battalion of Volunteers of the Côte-d'Or, and passing rapidly through all the junior grades, was made général de brigade after the combat of Rheinzabern (1793). As chief of the staff, he was present at the siege of Toulon in the same year and promoted général de division. He was, for a time, governor of Corsica.

In 1794 Delaborde served in the War of the Pyrenees against Spain, distinguishing himself at the Baztan Valley on 25 July and at Orbaizeta on 16 October.

His next command was on the Rhine. At the head of a division he took part in the celebrated campaigns of 1795-1797, and in 1796 covered général de division Jean Victor Marie Moreau's right when that general invaded Bavaria at the battles of Neresheim and Emmendingen. In late 1799, Delaborde led a division in actions at Philippsburg and at the French defeat at the battle of Wiesloch as part of général de division Claude Lecourbe's corps. In the 1800 campaign in southern Germany, Delaborde led a small division in Sainte-Suzanne's corps, which was part of Moreau's army.

Delaborde was in constant military employment during the Consulate and the early Empire and was made commander of the Legion of Honour in 1804.

== Peninsula ==
In 1807 he led a division in the Invasion of Portugal with General of Division Jean-Andoche Junot's army. Delaborde received the dignity of count in 1808. A British army under Sir Arthur Wellesley defeated Delaborde at the Battle of Roliça. At the Battle of Vimeiro on 21 August 1808, he was wounded while leading his troops in an unsuccessful frontal attack. He commanded a division under Marshal Nicolas Soult at the Battle of Corunna, the Battle of Braga in the First Battle of Porto campaign and the Second Battle of Porto.

== Later career ==
In 1812 Delaborde was one of Marshal Édouard Mortier's divisional commanders in the Russian campaign, leading the Young Guard. In early December when Napoleon abandoned his crippled Grand Army, Delaborde was still at Mortier's side. In 1813, he led the 3rd Division of the Young Guard until wounded in action at Pirna. In the following year he was awarded the Grand Cross of the Legion of Honor and was governor of the Castle of Compiègne. He joined Napoleon in the Hundred Days and became Chamberlain and a peer. Marked for punishment by the returning Bourbons, he was sent before a court-martial and only escaped condemnation through a technical flaw in the wording of the charge. The rest of his life was spent in retirement.

He was the father of the painter Henri Delaborde.
