= Solar eclipse of August 12, 2026 =

Total solar eclipse

- Total eclipse
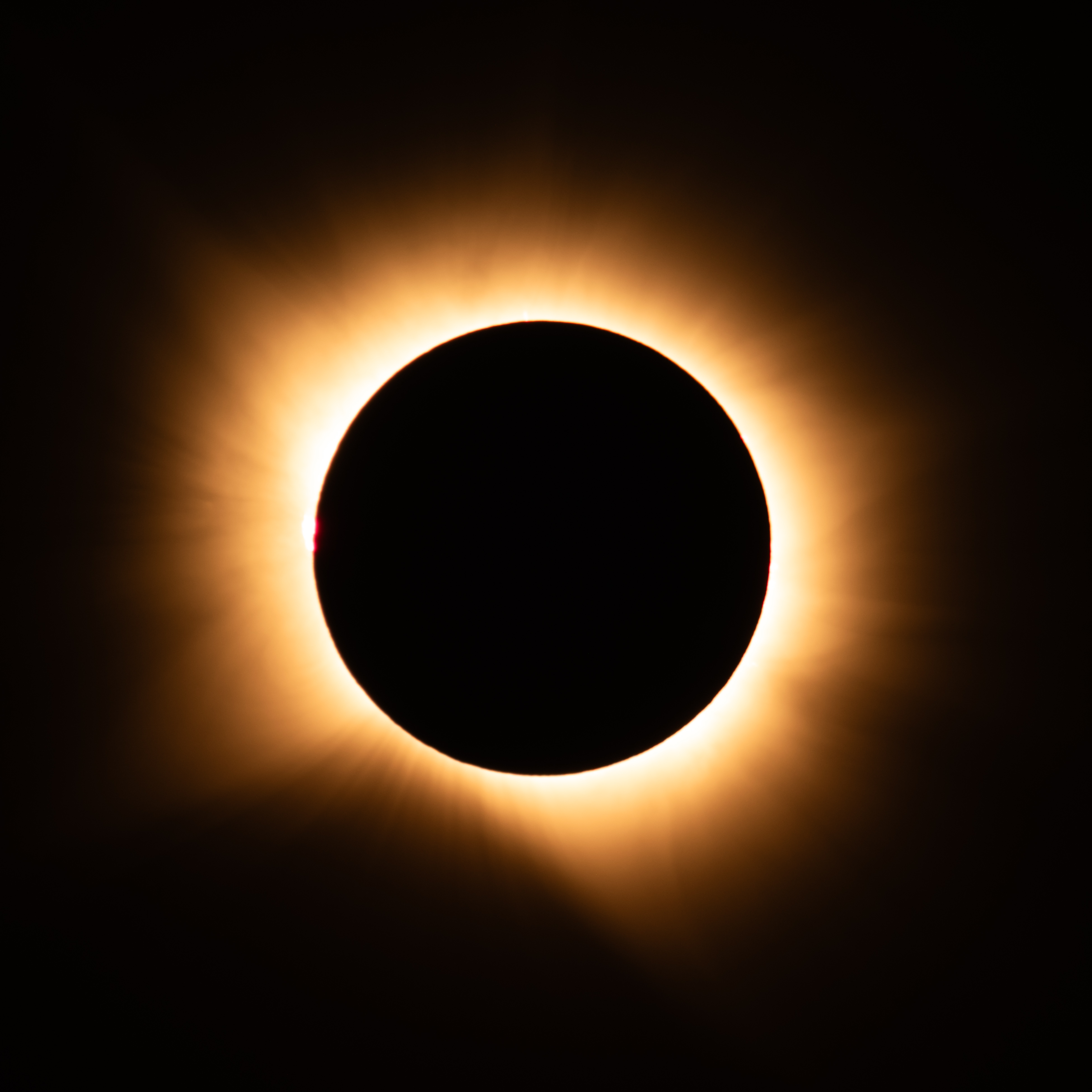
- Totality with solar corona from León, Spain

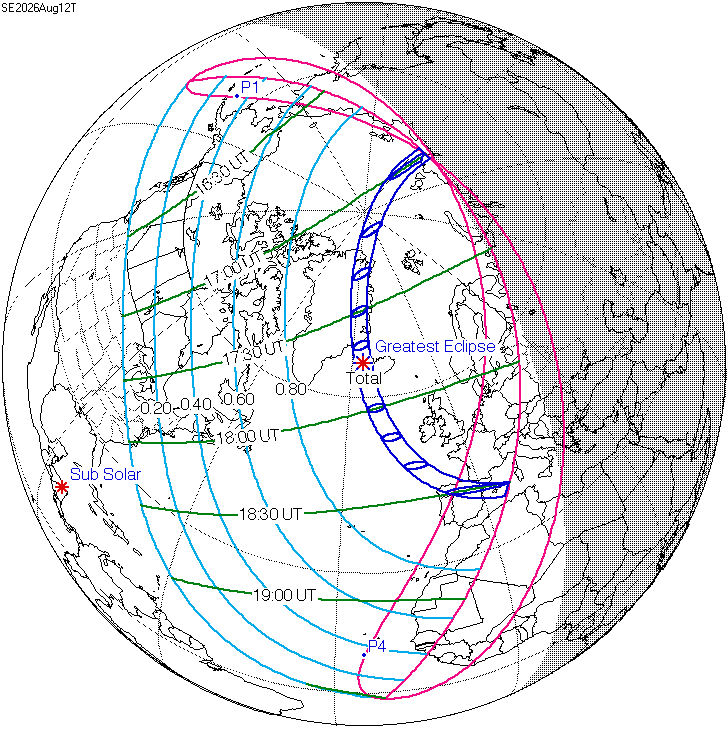
- Map
- Gamma: 0.8977
- Magnitude: 1.0386

Maximum eclipse
- Duration: 138 s (2 min 18 s)
- Coordinates: 65.2°N 25.2°W
- Max. width of band: 294 km (183 mi)

Times (UTC)
- Greatest eclipse: 17:47:06

References
- Saros: 126 (48 of 72)
- Catalog # (SE5000): 9566

A total solar eclipse occurred at the Moon's descending node of orbit on Wednesday, 12 August 2026, with a magnitude of 1.0386. Totality occurred in a narrow path across Earth's surface, with the partial solar eclipse visible over a surrounding region thousands of kilometres wide. Occurring about 2.3 days after perigee (on 10 August 2026, at 11:18 UTC), the Moon's apparent diameter was larger.

The total eclipse passed over northernmost Siberia, the Arctic, Greenland, Iceland, the Atlantic Ocean, northern Spain, a small part of northeastern Portugal, the Mediterranean Sea, and the Balearic Islands. The points of greatest duration and greatest eclipse were just 45 km (28 mi) off the western coast of Iceland around 65°30' N and 25°25' W, where the totality lasted 2 minutes and 18.2 seconds. The first part of the total eclipse path unusually passed from east to west from Russia to Greenland, passing about 100 km south of the North Pole. A partial eclipse covered more than 90% of the Sun in Ireland, Great Britain, and northern Italy, and to a lesser extent across much of the rest of Europe, North Africa, and northern North America. The total eclipse passed over northern Spain from the Atlantic coast to the Mediterranean coast, as well as the Balearic Islands. The total eclipse was visible from the cities of A Coruña, Valencia, Zaragoza, Palma, and Bilbao, but both Madrid and Barcelona were just outside the path of totality.

This was the first total eclipse to be visible in Europe since 20 March 2015, and the first one to cross over Mainland Europe since 11 August 1999. It was the first total solar eclipse visible in Iceland since 30 June 1954, also solar saros series 126 (descending node), and the only one to occur in the 21st century; the next one visible over Iceland will be in 2196. It was also the first total solar eclipse visible from the territory of present-day Spain since 2 October 1959 in the Canary Islands, and the first from the Spanish mainland since 30 August 1905. The next total eclipse visible in Spain will happen less than a year later on 2 August 2027.

== Observations ==
Animated path

The eclipse path proceeded from North Siberia throughout the Arctic Region, Iceland, the eastern Atlantic to Spain, and the Mediterranean.

=== Solar eclipse below the horizon ===
The considerable eclipse gamma (more than 0.8) gave observers—where the totally eclipsed Sun was just below the horizon—an opportunity to observe the lunar shadow in the high atmosphere as well as shortened civil twilight and extended nautical twilight. The darkening of the twilight sky improved the chances of observing the inner zodiacal light.

=== Bright planets and stars visible during totality ===
Far northern Russia was treated to a dawn eclipse. In the east of the Taymyr Peninsula (north-east of Krasnoyarsk Krai) the maximum of total phase occurred on 13 August at 00:00 local time during the midnight sun.

In Iceland, the eclipse was a mid-afternoon event occurring about 4 hours before sunset; it started in Reykjavík at around 16:47, with totality being reached at 17:48.

In Spain, the eclipse occurred about 1 hour before sunset. Mercury and Jupiter, west of the eclipsed Sun, were therefore very low below it. Venus was brilliant well up in the southwest, with Spica to its east. Arcturus was high in the south, and the Summer Triangle was well up in the east. Lower in the south, Antares was minutes away from transit.

== Gallery ==
=== Total ===
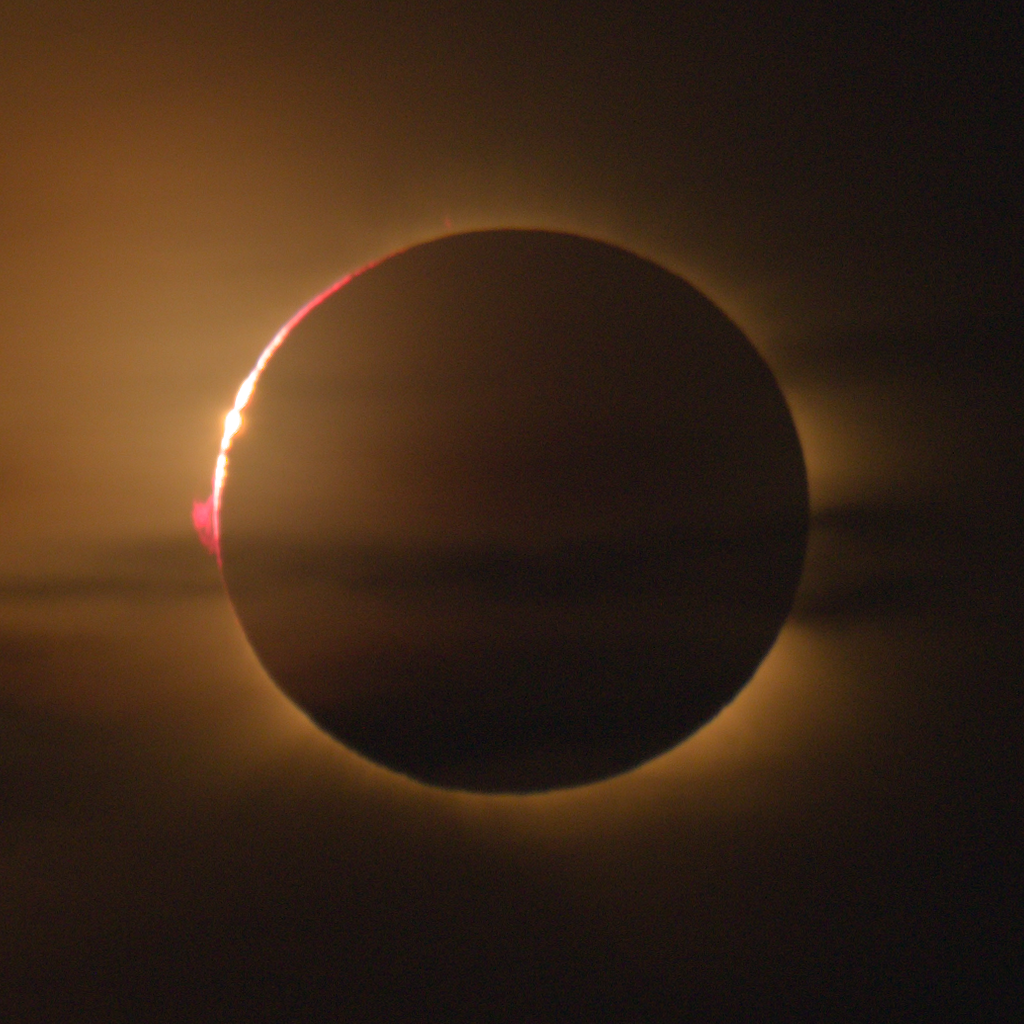
With Baily's beads from Estellencs, Spain

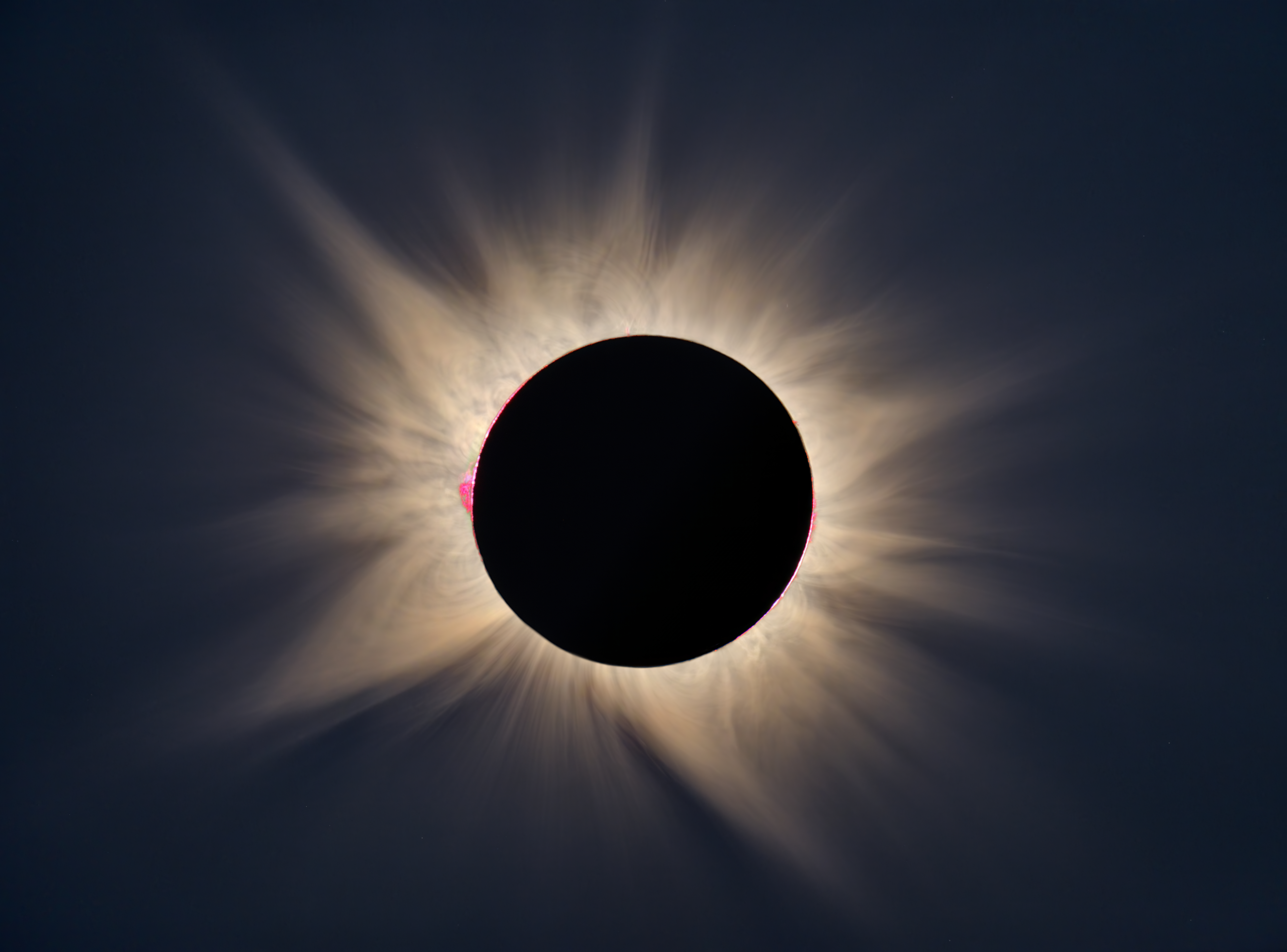
Totality from Torrehermosa, Spain. Solar prominences and Baily's beads clearly visible on the left, right and at the top.

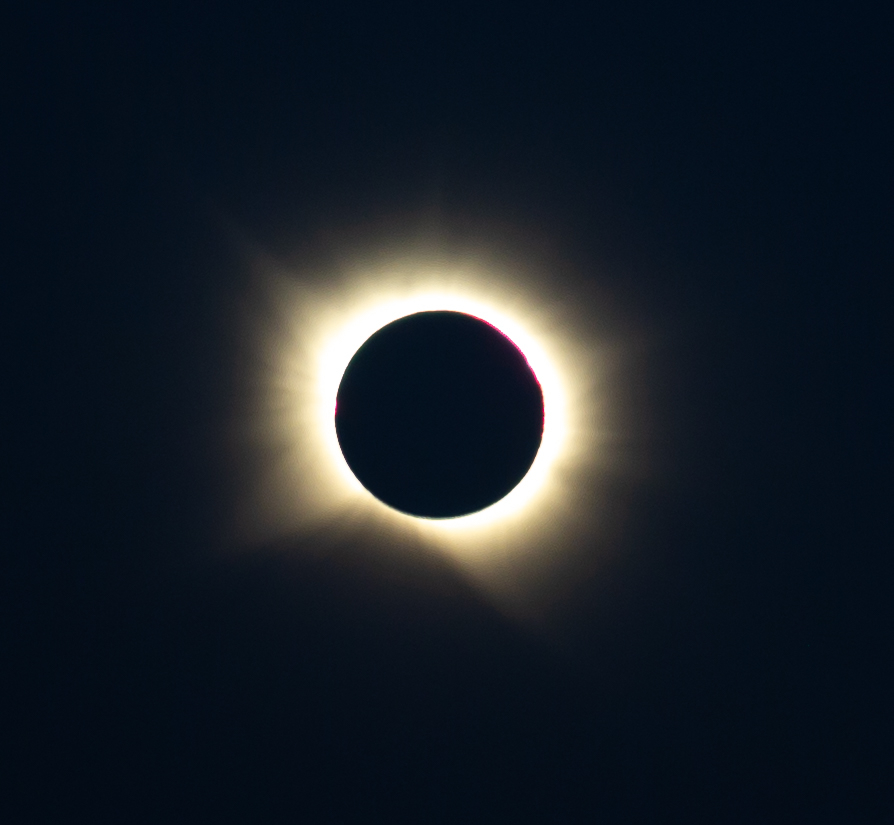
From Vitoria-Gasteiz, Spain

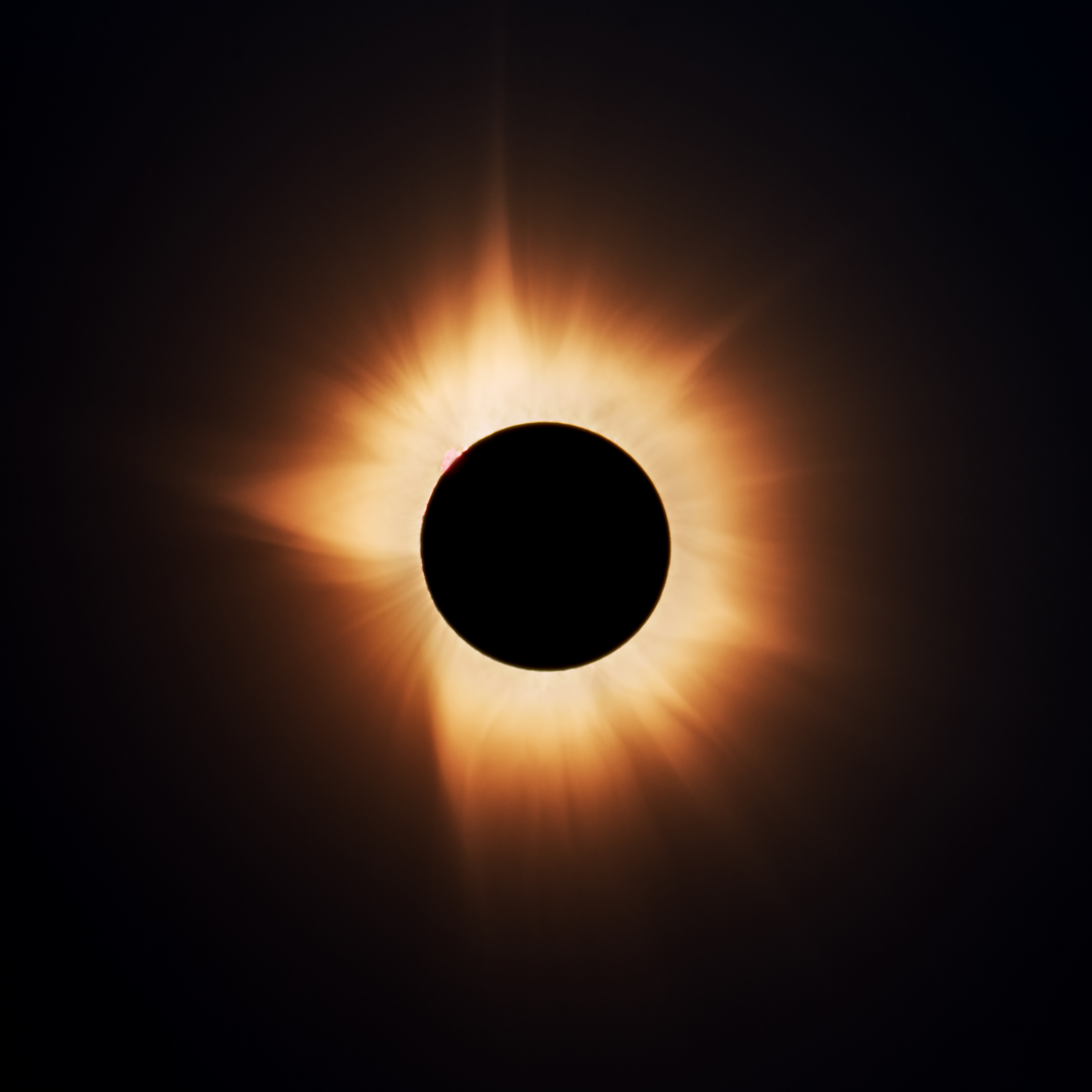
Totality from Valladolid, Spain

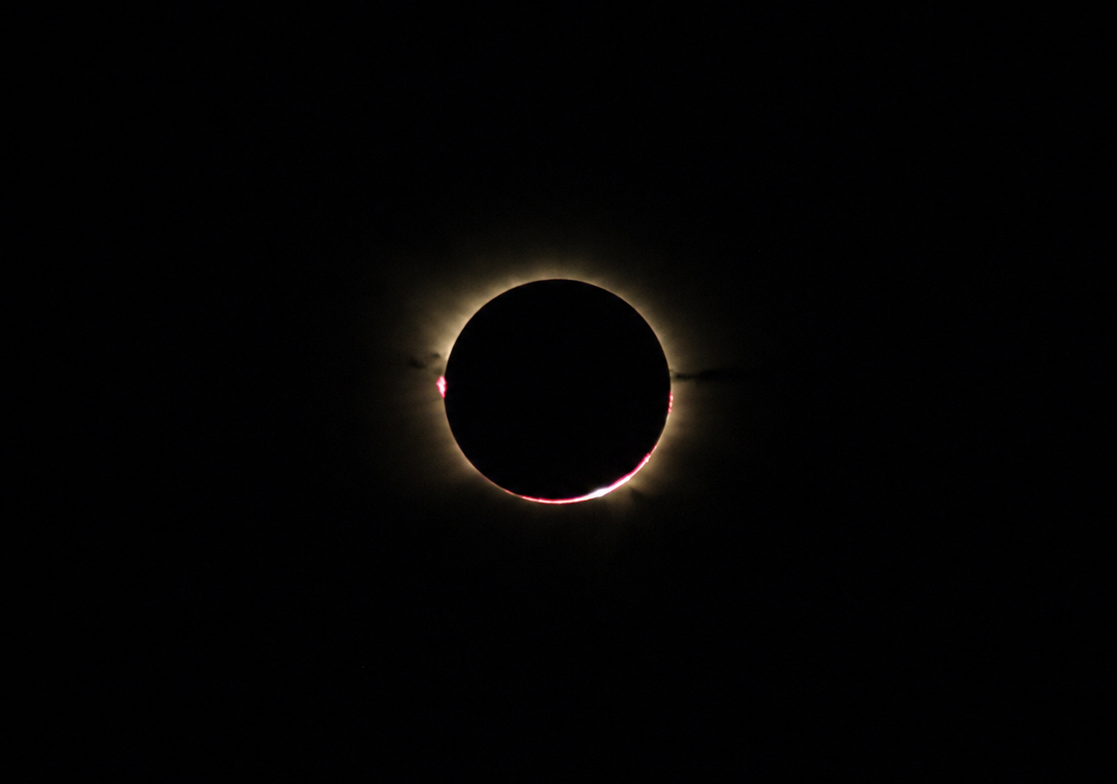
Totality from Valencia, Spain. Solar prominences can be seen around the sides and below the solar disk.

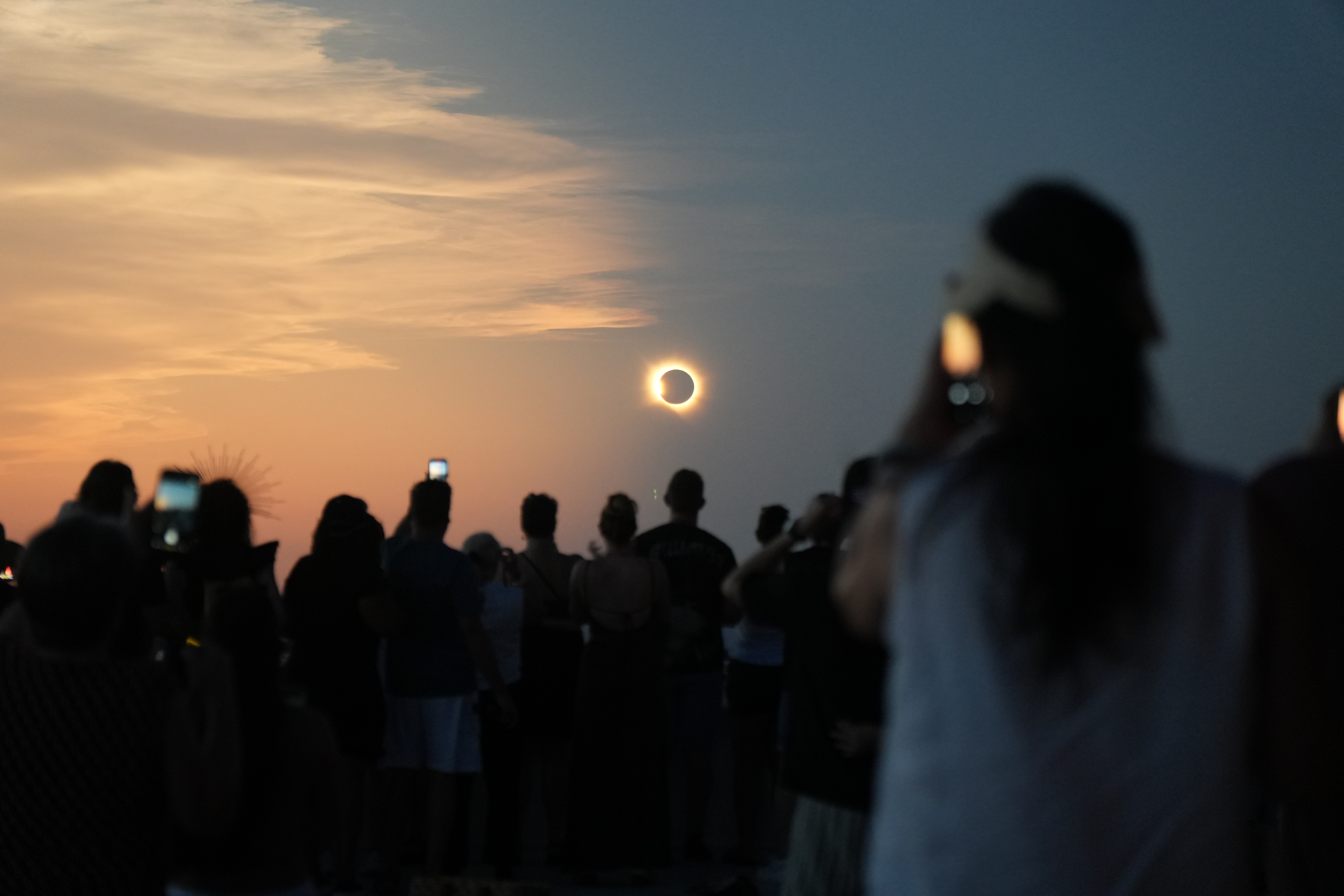
View from a cruise ship north of Ibiza, Spain, with diamond ring effect visible

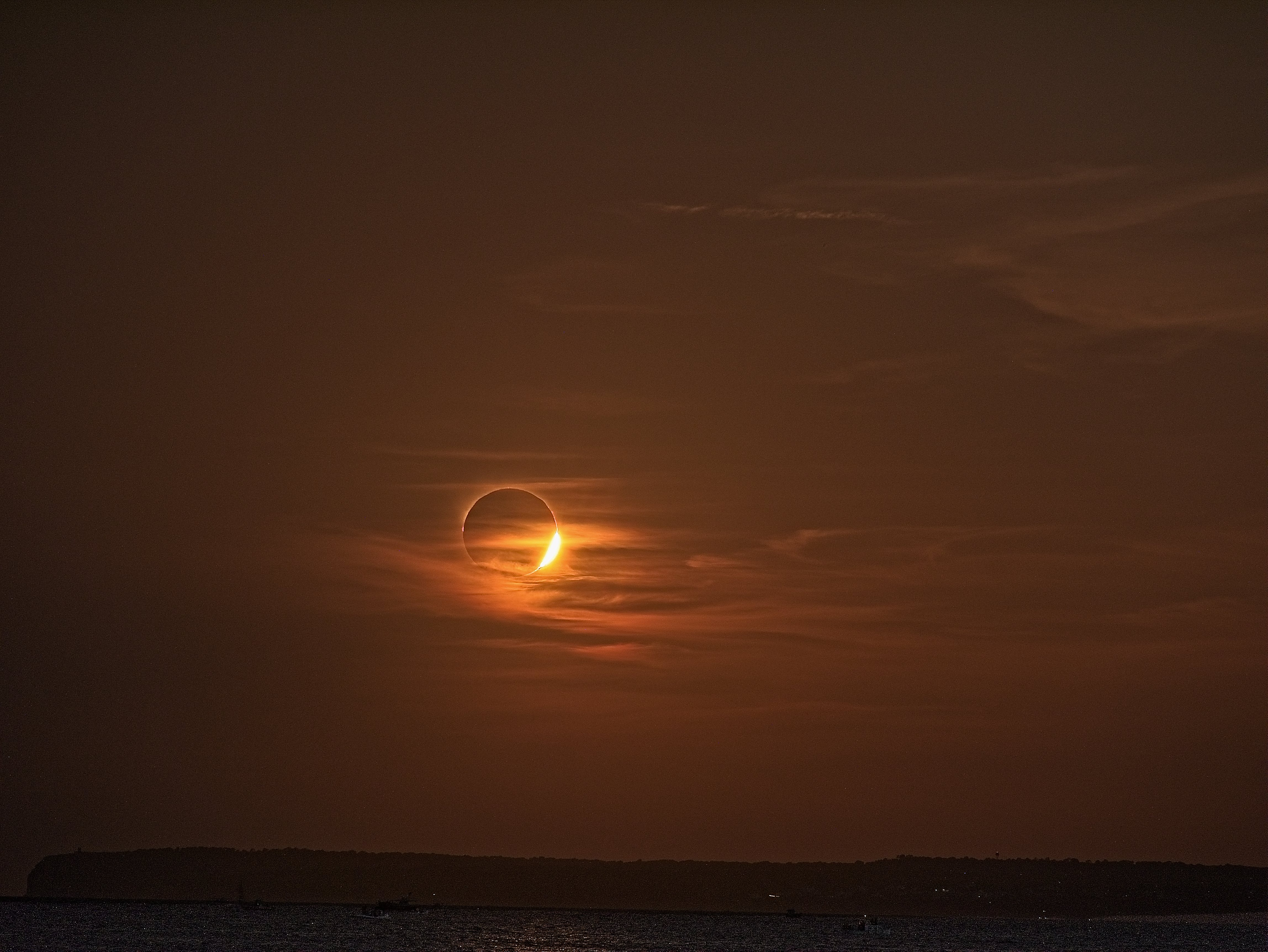
Diamond ring effect in the glow of sunset in Colònia de Sant Jordi, Mallorca, Spain

Partial solar eclipse as seen from Etyek, Hungary.

=== Partial ===
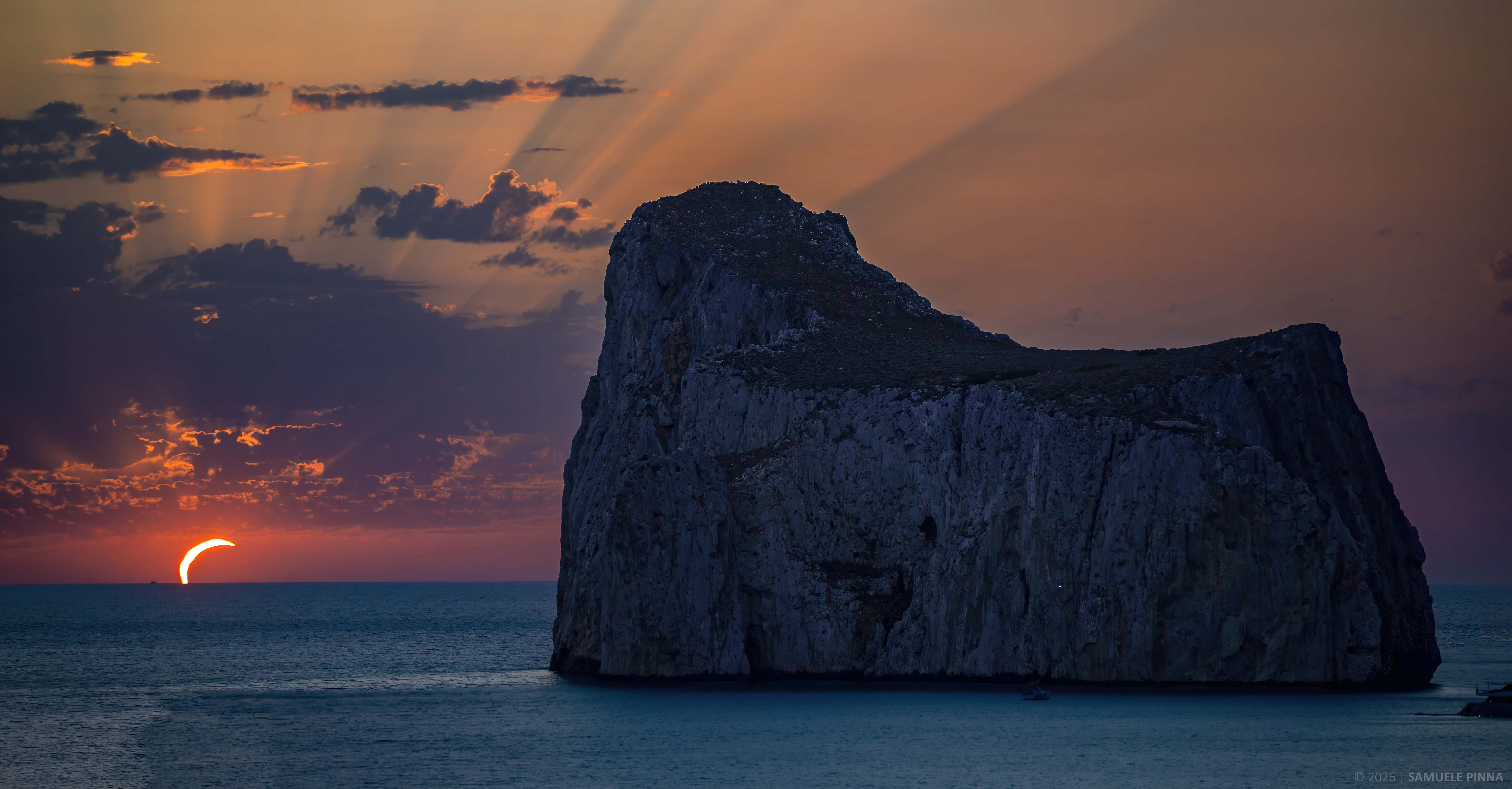
From Iglesias, Sardinia, with crepuscular rays and Pan di Zucchero sea stack

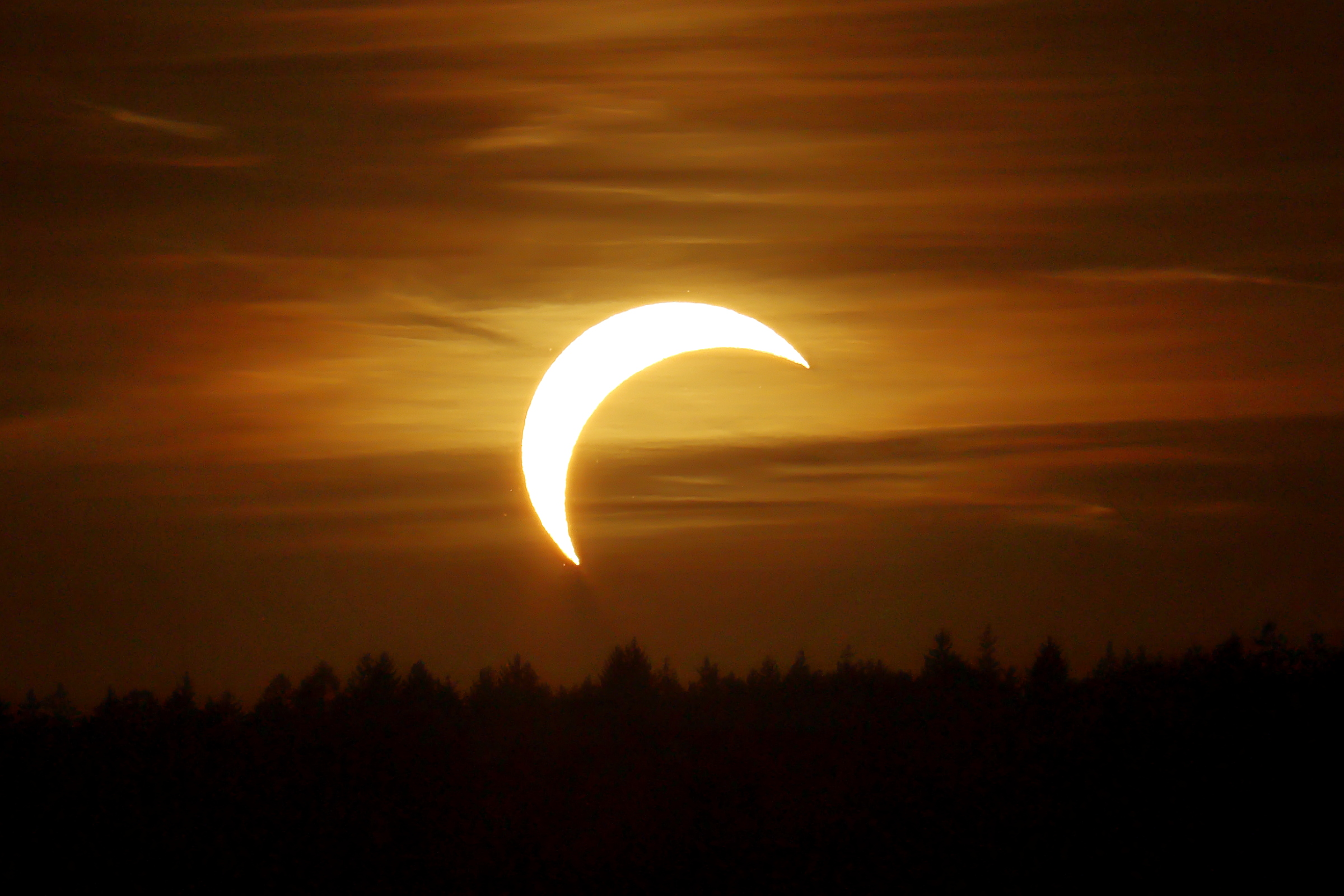
From Vöcklabruck, Austria

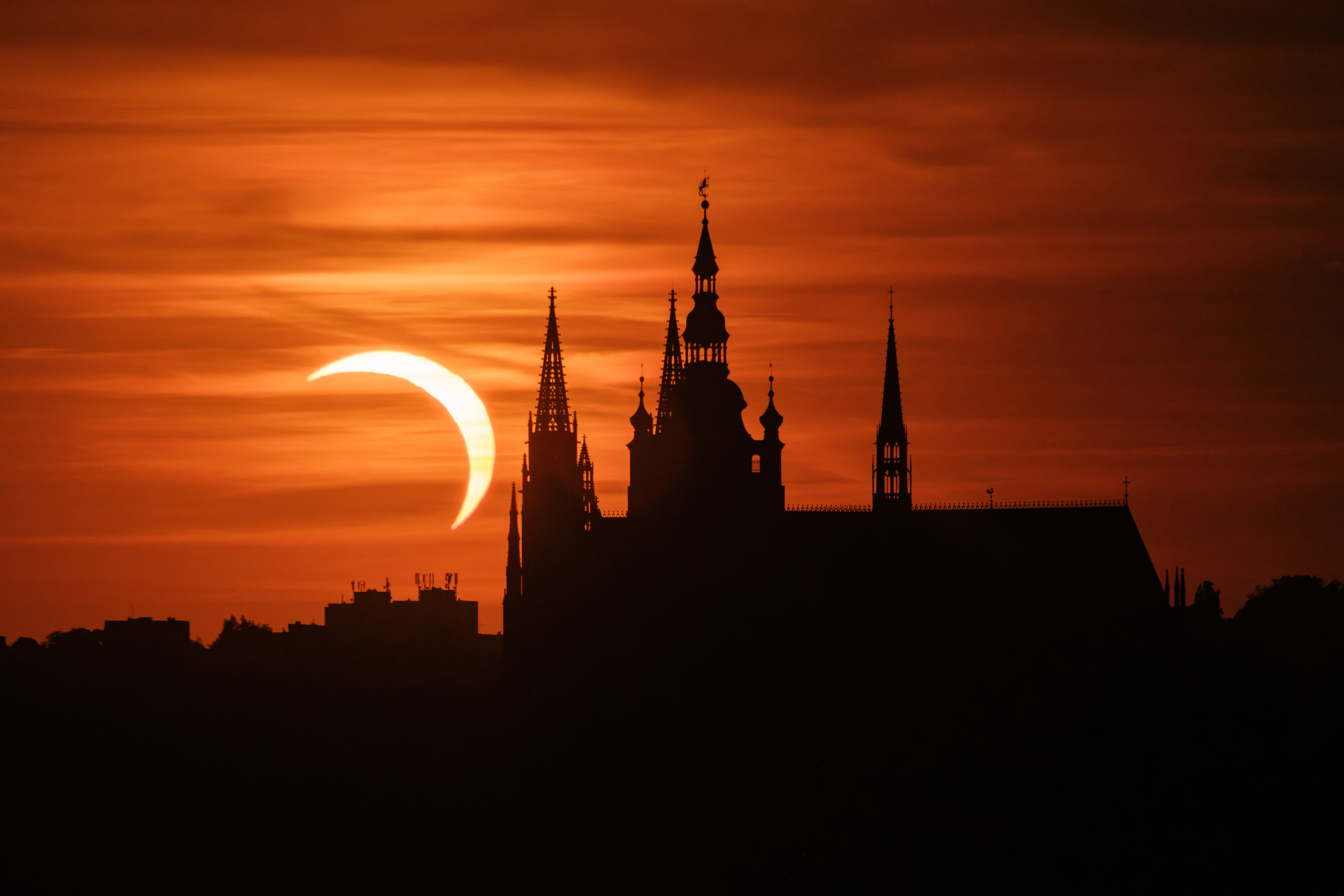
From Prague, Czech Republic, with Prague Castle visible

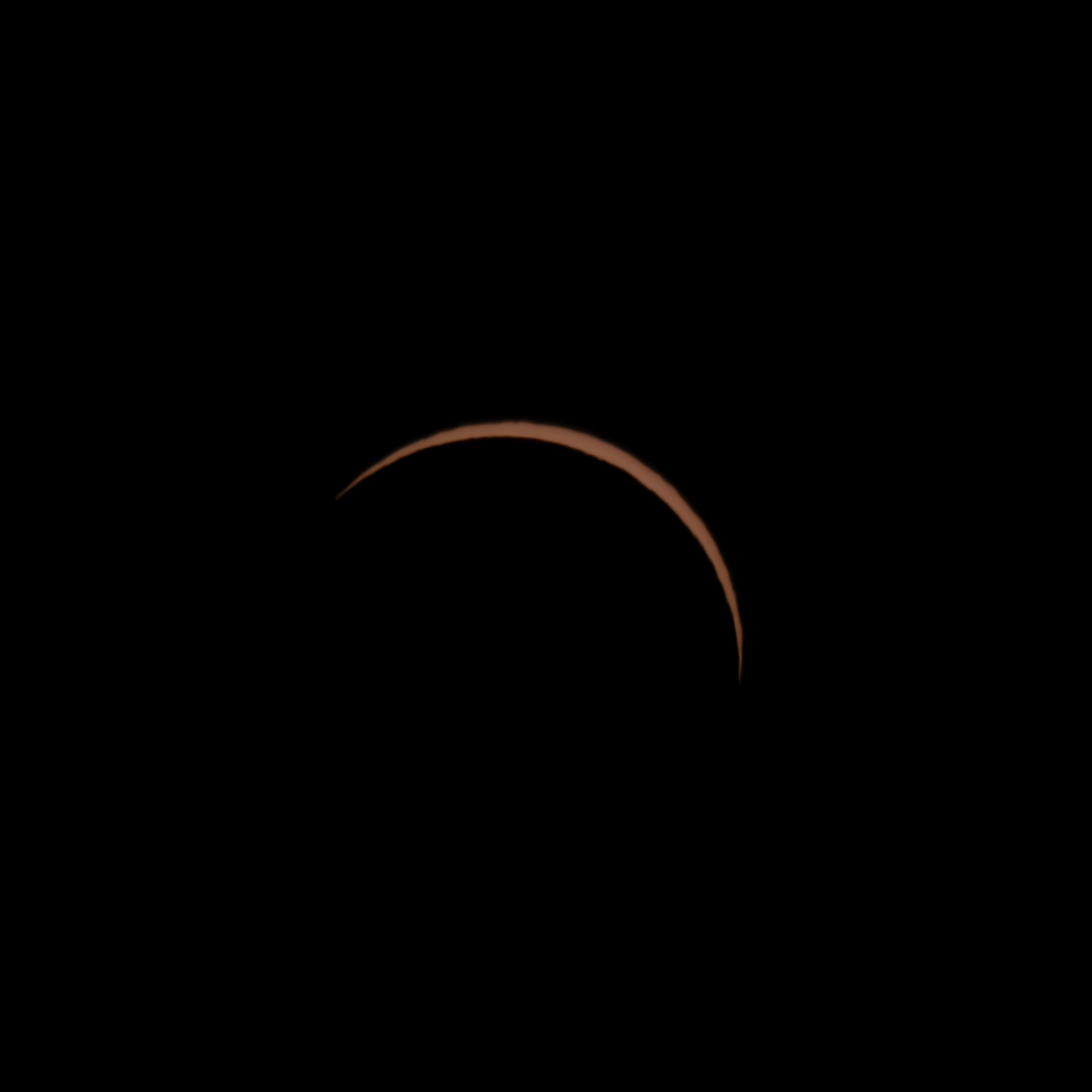
From La Rochelle, France, where the eclipse was 96.6%

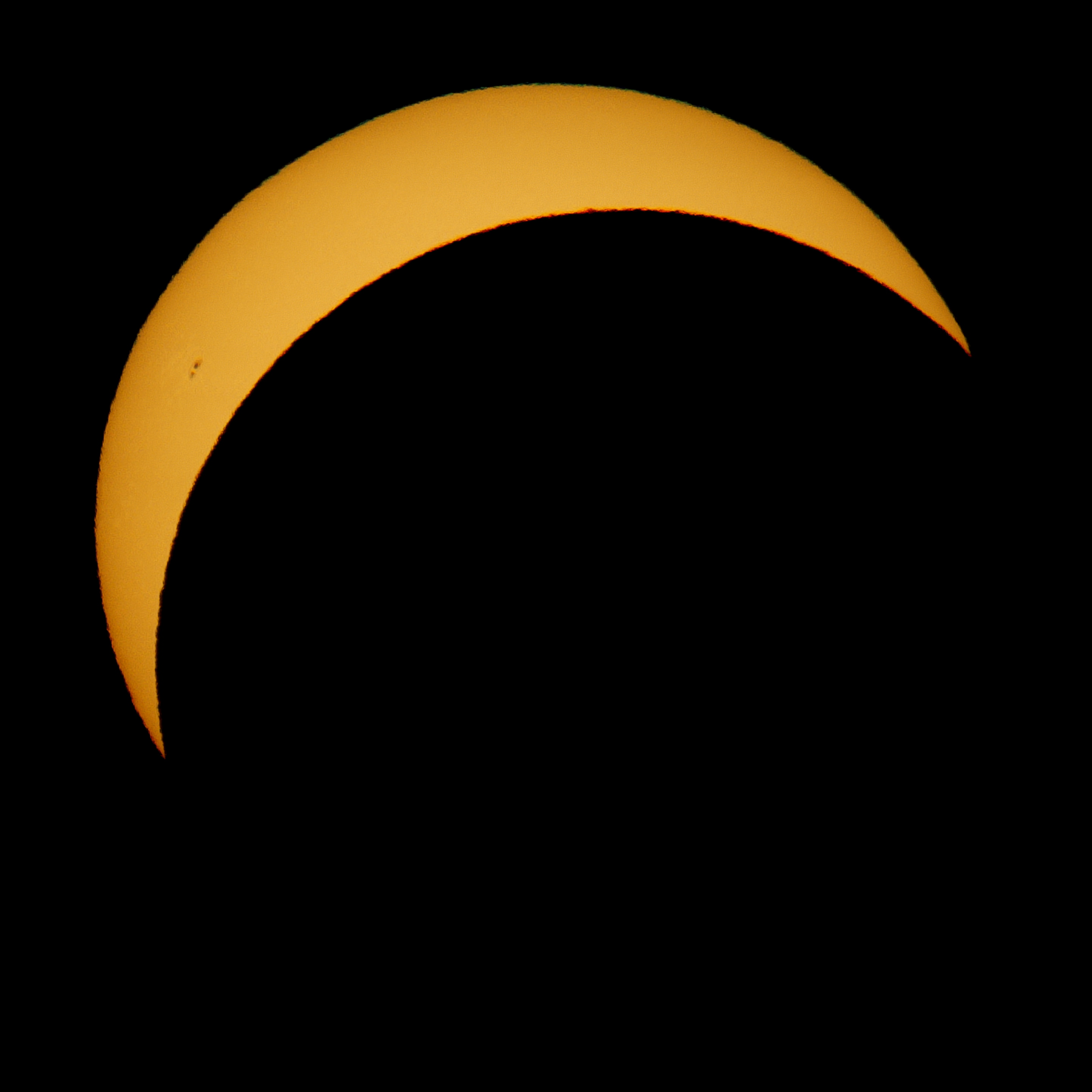
From Berlin-Wedding, Germany, with green and red edges due to atmospheric refraction

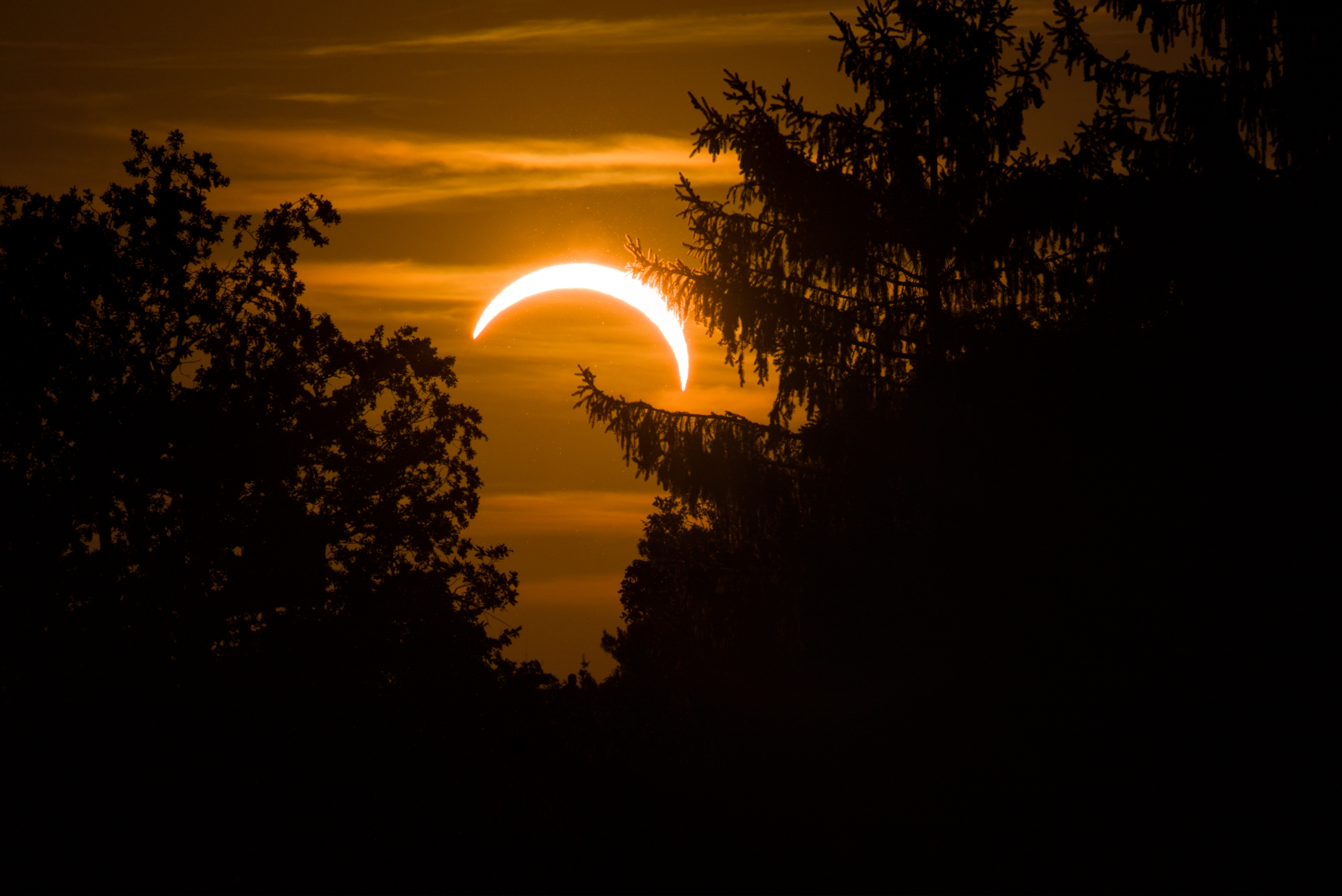
From Passau, Germany

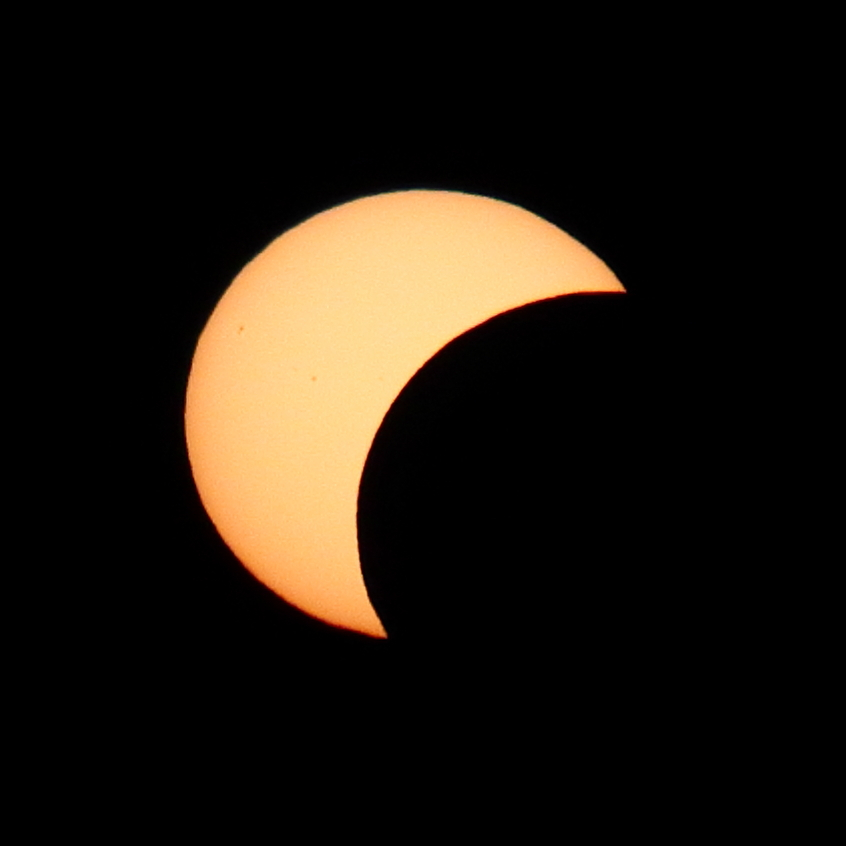
From Warsaw, Poland

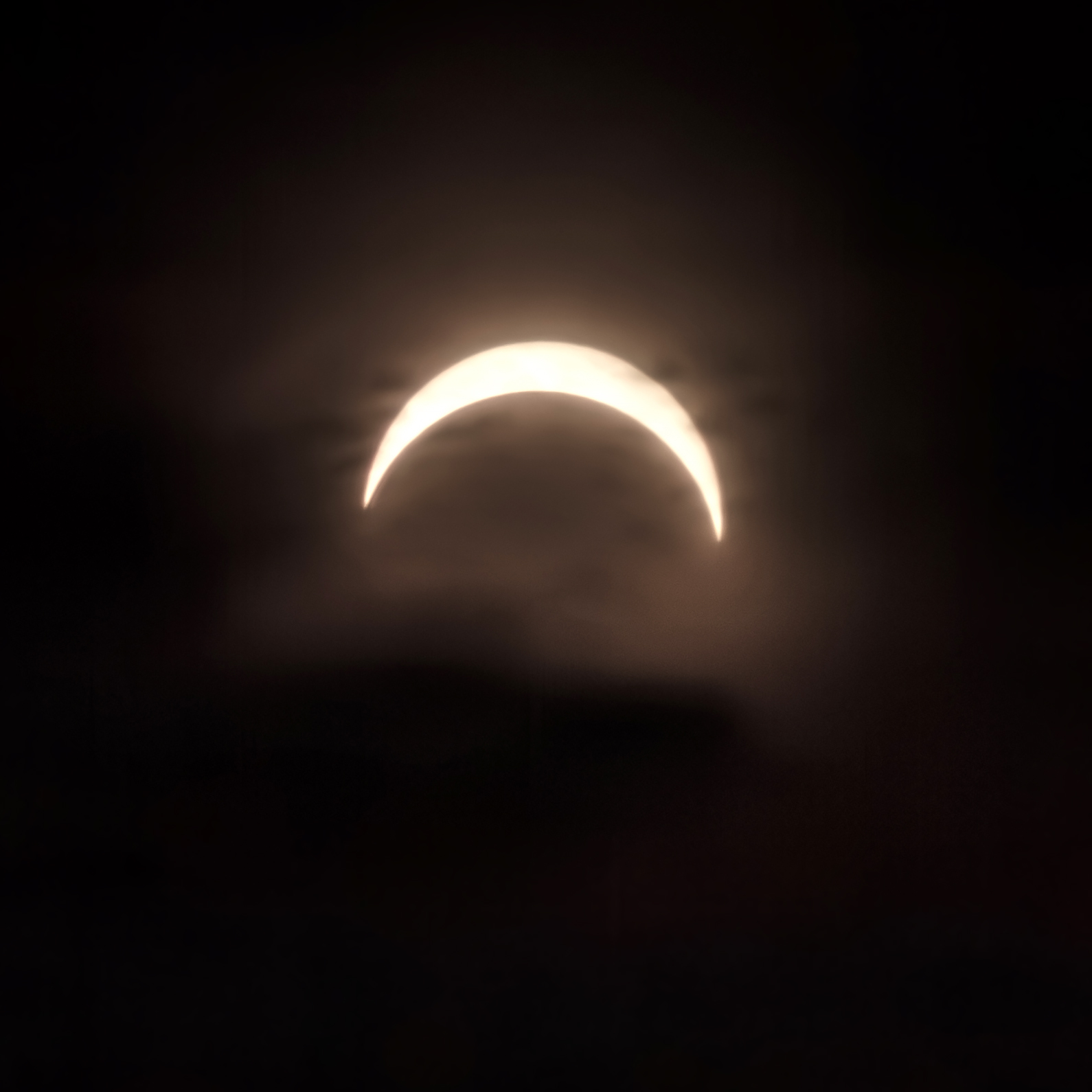
From Brastad, Sweden

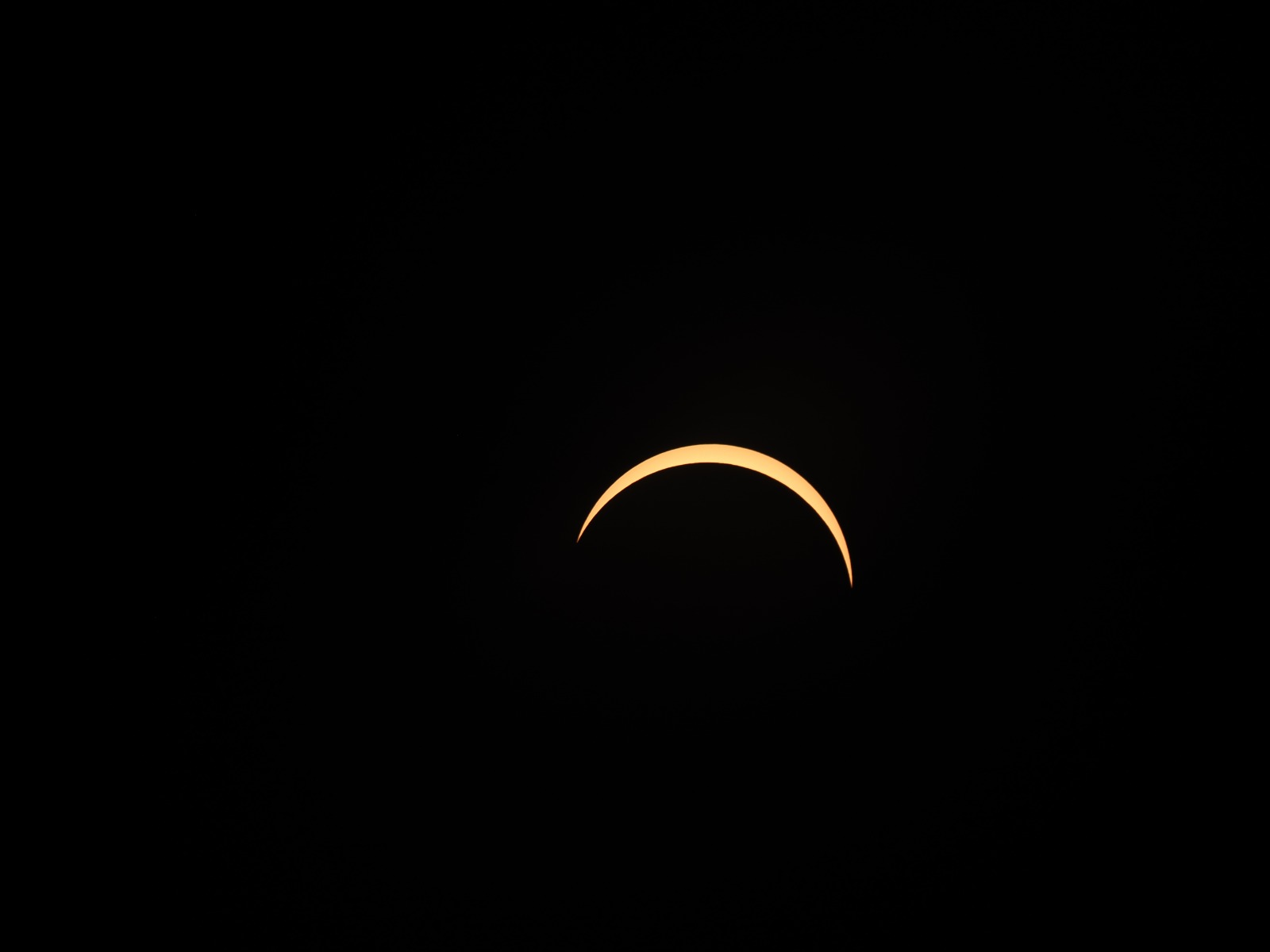
From Bath, England

From Undy, Wales

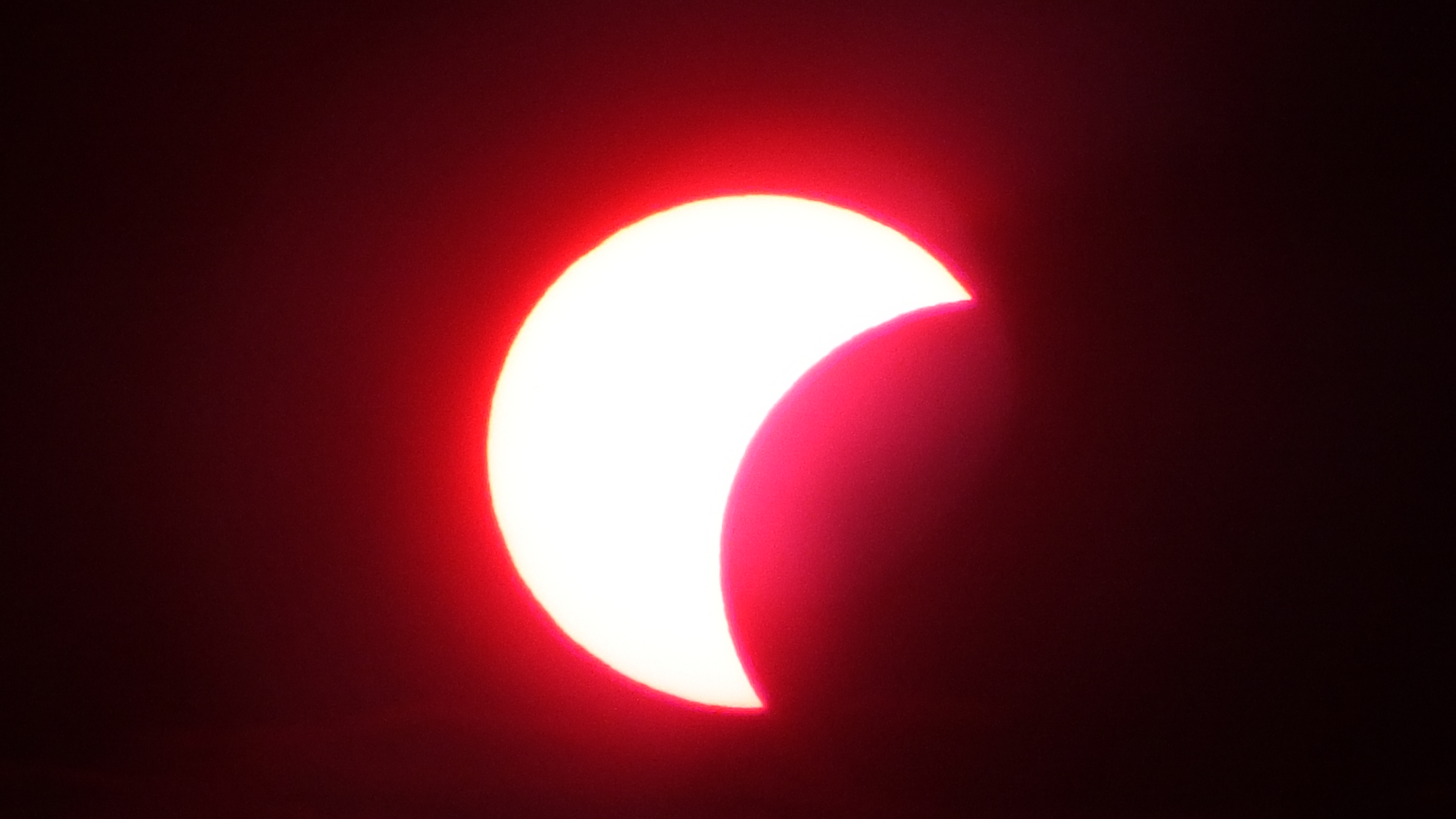
From Saint Petersburg, Russia

=== Views outside Europe ===
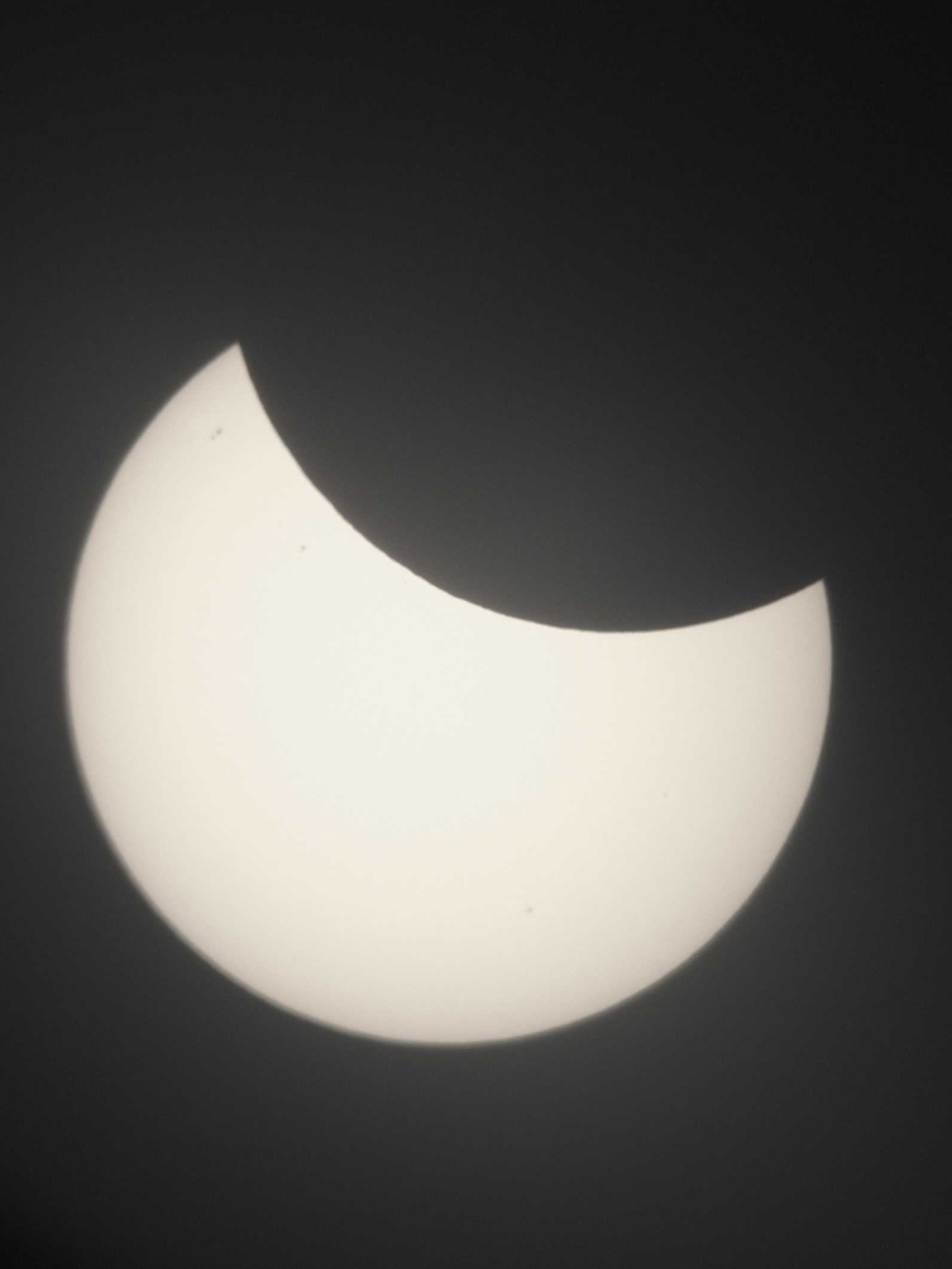
Partial from Halifax, Nova Scotia

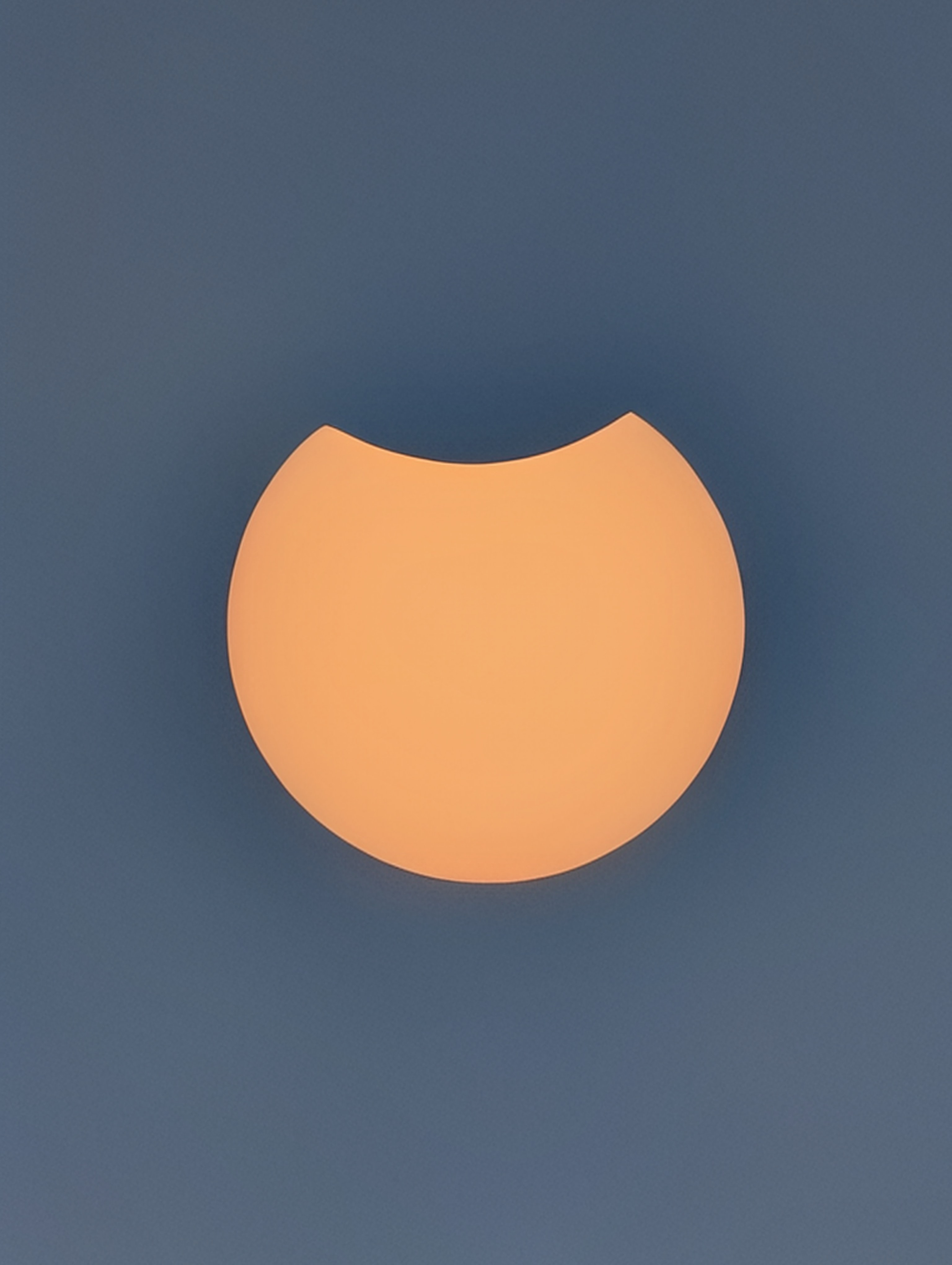
Partial from White Plains, New York

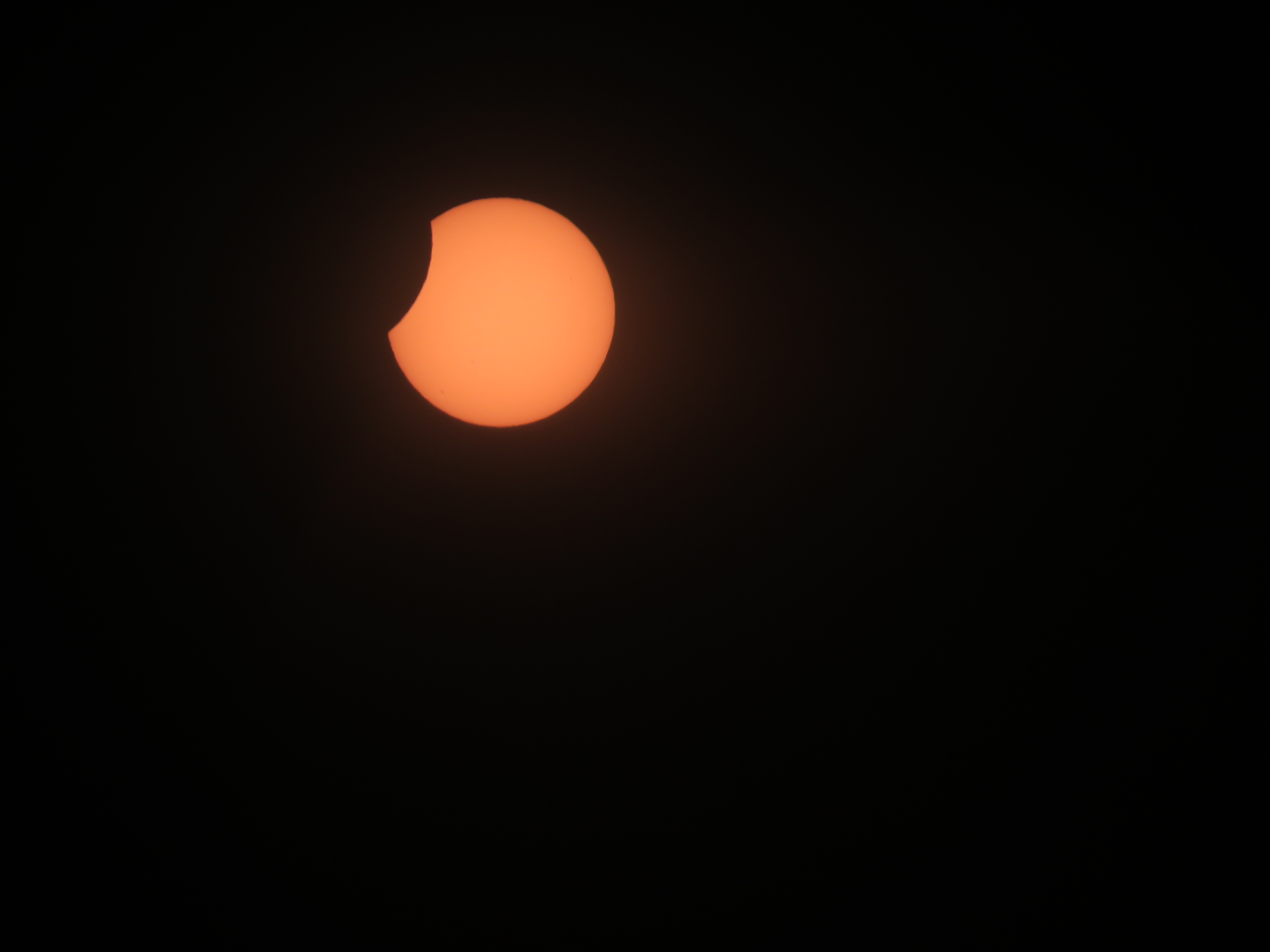
Partial from Edmonton, Alberta

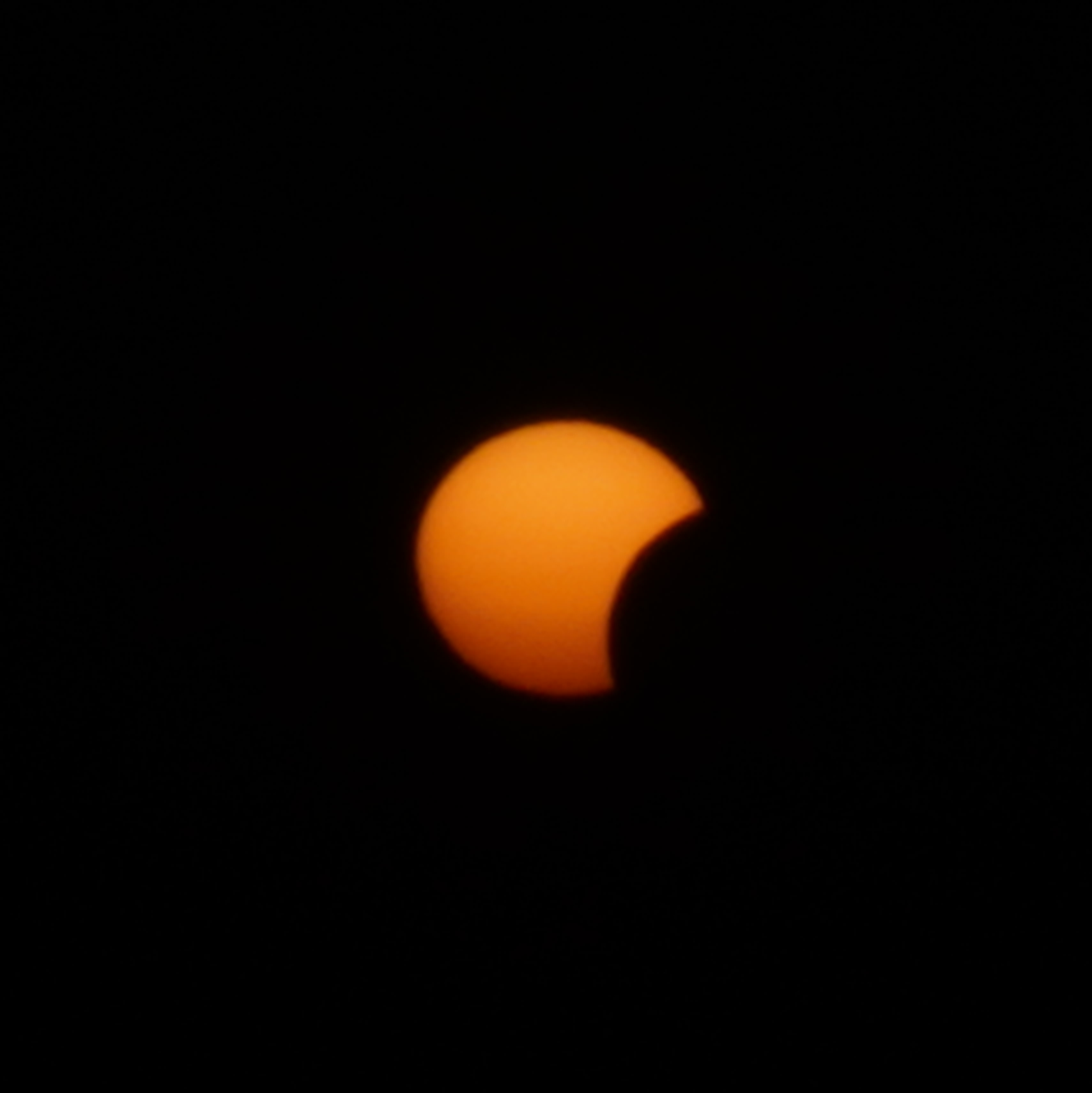
Partial from Sayada, Tunisia

=== Composites ===
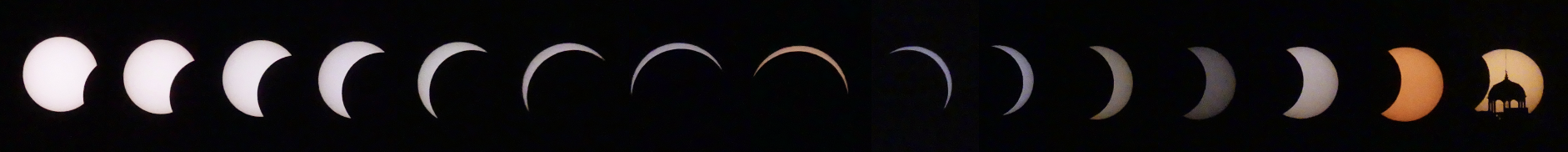
Chronophotography of the eclipse from Cheverny, France

Time-lapse sequence from Logroño, Spain

Time-lapse sequence from Molina de Aragón, Spain

Time-lapse of the eclipse from Pleumeur-Bodou, France

== News and tourism ==
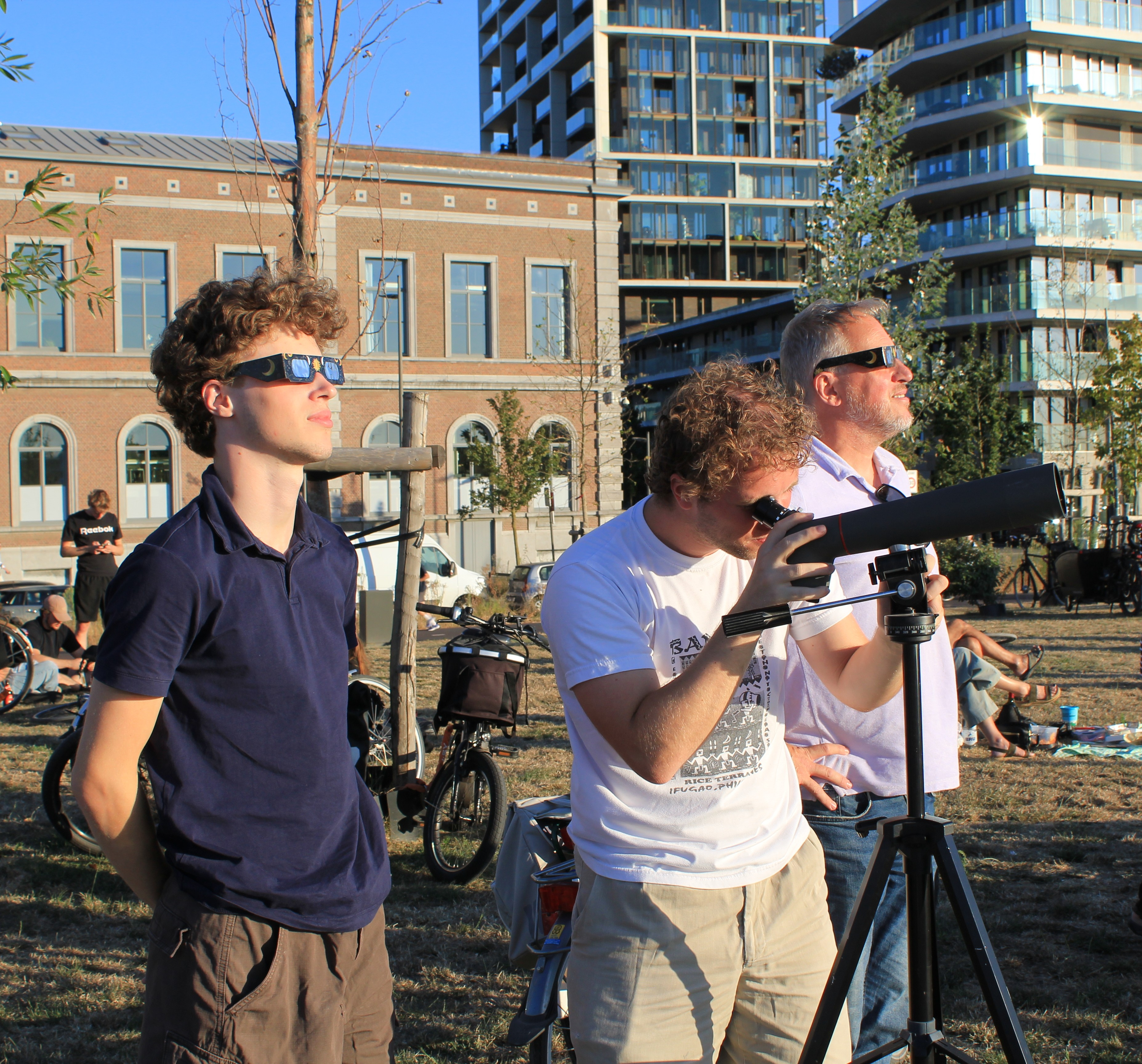
People watching the eclipse in Antwerp, Belgium

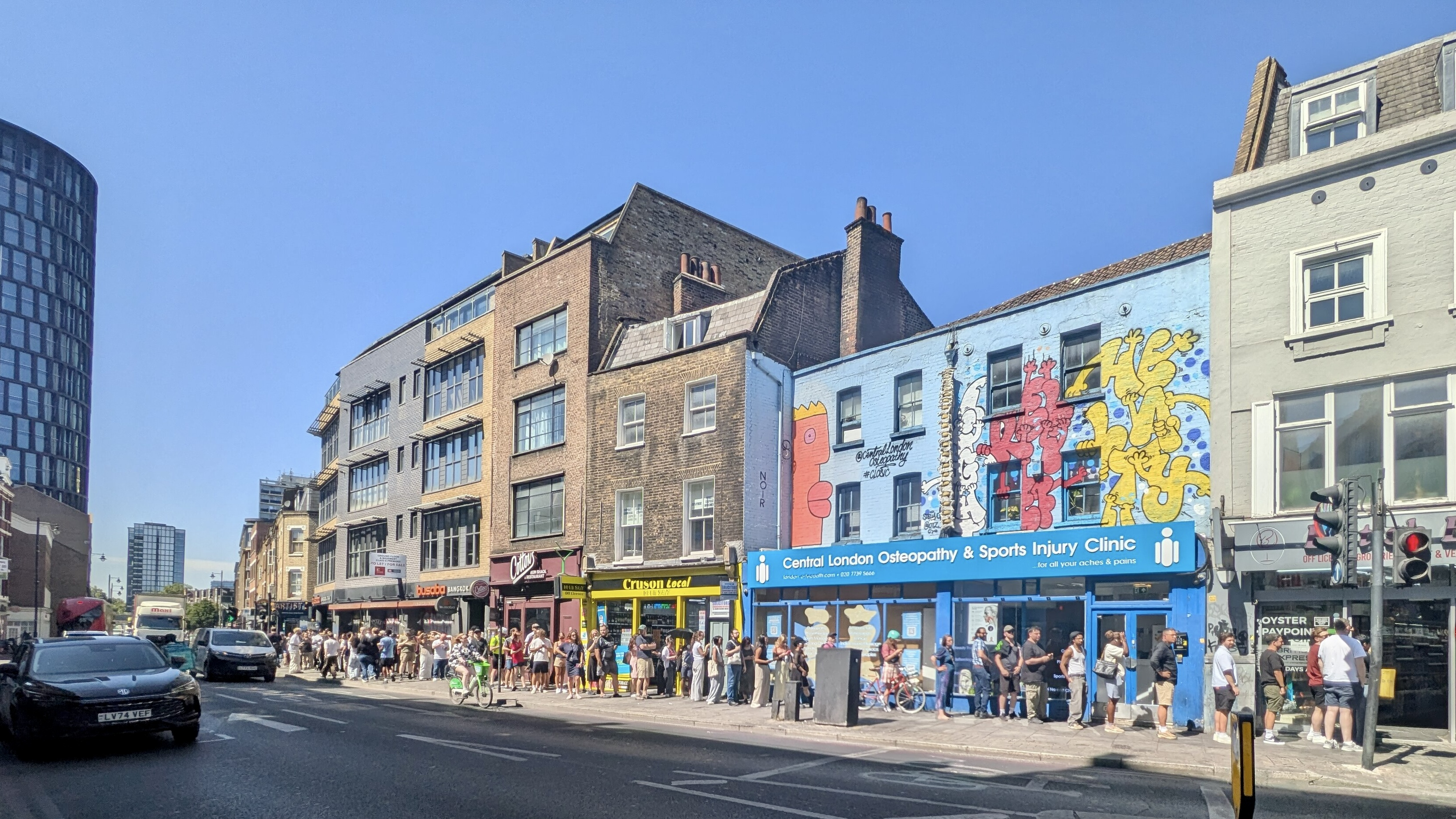
Queue for eclipse glasses, London, UK

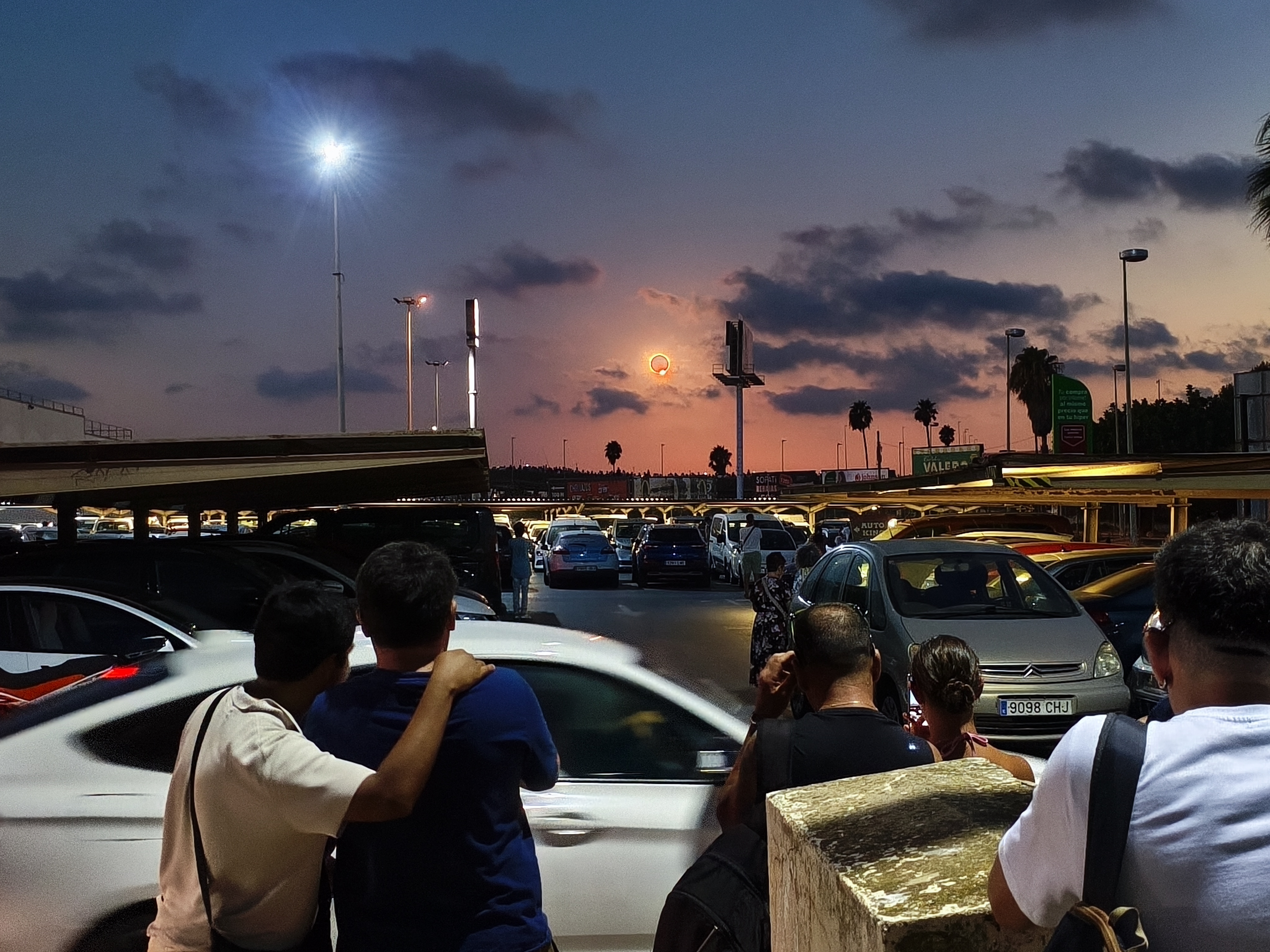
Totality of the solar eclipse in Valencia, Spain, with large crowds of visitors gathered to witness the event.

The longest the eclipse lasted on land was in Látrabjarg, in the remote Westfjords of Iceland. Plans were made to ensure safety in the area, but many of the roads to Látrabjarg are very narrow and dangerous. There was talk of closing the area to car traffic and ferrying people by bus. Work had started on repairing parts of the road to Látrabjarg, partly as routine maintenance but also because of the eclipse.

All locations where the eclipse was likely to be better seen experienced a surge in hotel room prices.

Roscosmos and Yandex Weather organized a live broadcast of the partial eclipse (up to 79% obscuration) in Saint Petersburg from the top of Lakhta Center, the tallest building in Russia and Europe. Astronaut Pyotr Dubrov also captured the eclipse from the ISS, at an altitude of approximately 400 kilometers.

In Spain and Portugal, there was a surge of eclipse tourists moving towards locations that social media and news reports identified as the best spots to see the eclipse. In Spain, 660 official viewing sites were selected by regional governments to handle the expected influx of more than 440,000 people. Authorities estimated between 1.5 million and 6 million people could be on the road during the day to head to viewing sites, which prompted the deployment of 24,000 police officers around the area of the eclipse. In Portugal, news outlets outlined the use of eclipse glasses, pointed out a Perseid meteor shower would happen after the eclipse, and explored the history of the last time a total solar eclipse was seen in the country (17 April 1912) and the fact that the next one will only be seen in 118 years.

Euronews reported on the hat-trick of solar eclipses that Spain will experience in the next three consecutive years.

On 13 August, the BBC published an article about how to check for eye damage caused by the Sun during an eclipse, citing that 70 people were left with permanent damaged sight after the 1999 eclipse.

== Research ==
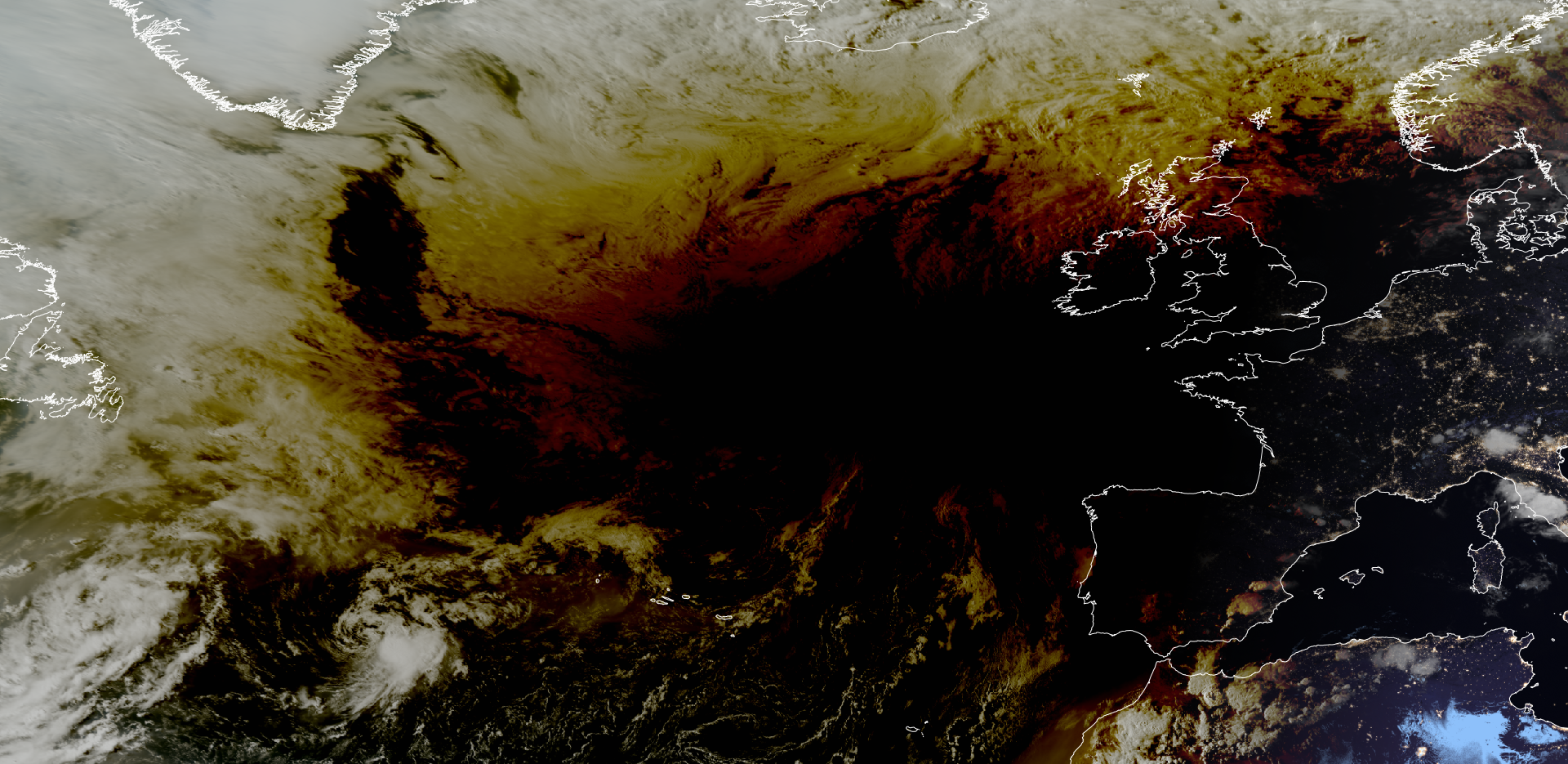
GeoColor satellite imagery at 18:10 UTC with Tropical Storm Cristobal in the bottom left

NASA flew one of its WB-57s to chase the eclipse's shadow over the North Atlantic Ocean near Iceland, allowing more time to conduct coronal research. The aircraft flew at an altitude of 50,000 feet (15.2 kilometres) to avoid cloud cover and reduce atmospheric effects, and its planned speed of 460 miles per hour (400 kn) aimed to extend its view of totality from 2 minutes and 18 seconds to nearly 3 minutes. On board the aircraft were four cameras to capture the corona in various wavelengths of visible and infrared light. Data captured aims to help researchers better understand the corona's temperature and the causes of solar wind.

== Eclipse timing ==
=== Places experiencing total eclipse ===
Solar eclipse of 12 August 2026 (local times)
Country or territory	City or place	Start of partial eclipse	Start of total eclipse	Maximum eclipse	End of total eclipse	End of partial eclipse	Totality (minutes)	Eclipse (hours)	Maximum magnitude
Greenland	Station Nord	16:19:51	17:18:08	17:18:16	17:18:24	18:15:53	0:16	1:56	1.0005
Iceland	Ísafjörður	16:43:17	17:44:08	17:44:53	17:45:39	18:43:59	1:31	2:01	1.0052
Iceland	Látrabjarg	16:43:39	17:44:28	17:45:34	17:46:41	18:44:55	2:13	2:01	1.014
Iceland	Borgarnes	16:46:28	17:47:41	17:48:00	17:48:21	18:46:53	0:40	2:00	1.0012
Iceland	Reykjavík	16:47:11	17:48:16	17:48:47	17:49:17	18:47:40	1:01	2:00	1.0024
Iceland	Keflavík	16:47:11	17:48:05	17:48:54	17:49:44	18:47:54	1:39	2:01	1.0064
Portugal	Guadramil / Rio de Onor	18:33:49	19:30:20	19:30:29	19:30:37	20:23:31 (sunset)	0:17	1:49	1.0006
Spain	Santander	19:31:22	20:26:57	20:27:29	20:28:01	21:20:09	1:04	1:52	1.0036
Spain	Bilbao	19:31:47	20:27:23	20:27:38	20:27:54	21:19:07 (sunset)	0:31	1:47	1.0011
Spain	Gijón	19:31:02	20:26:48	20:27:40	20:28:33	21:20:46	1:45	1:50	1.0127
Spain	Oviedo	19:31:19	20:27:05	20:28:00	20:28:54	21:21:06	1:49	1:50	1.0155
Spain	Vitoria-Gasteiz	19:32:31	20:27:43	20:28:15	20:28:47	21:17:12 (sunset)	1:04	1:45	1.0038
Spain	A Coruña	19:30:56	20:27:40	20:28:19	20:28:57	21:22:01	1:17	1:51	1.005
Spain	Lugo	19:31:43	20:28:07	20:28:50	20:29:31	21:22:16	1:24	1:51	1.0063
Spain	Logroño	19:33:13	20:28:09	20:28:50	20:29:31	21:15:33 (sunset)	1:22	1:42	1.0067
Spain	Burgos	19:33:21	20:28:24	20:29:17	20:30:08	21:20:12 (sunset)	1:44	1:47	1.0139
Spain	Ponferrada	19:32:42	20:28:44	20:29:28	20:30:11	21:22:36	1:27	1:50	1.0069
Spain	Zaragoza	19:34:40	20:29:02	20:29:44	20:30:27	21:07:33 (sunset)	1:25	1:33	1.0074
Spain	Palencia	19:33:53	20:29:08	20:29:59	20:30:51	21:22:35	1:43	1:49	1.0123
Spain	Salou	19:35:38	20:29:31	20:30:05	20:30:39	20:58:21 (sunset)	1:08	1:23	1.0046
Spain	Valladolid	19:34:30	20:29:53	20:30:37	20:31:20	21:22:54 (sunset)	1:27	1:48	1.0076
Spain	Mahón	19:37:22	20:30:16	20:30:51	20:31:26	20:43:31 (sunset)	1:10	1:06	1.0055
Spain	Port de Pollença	19:37:27	20:30:30	20:31:14	20:31:58	20:48:16 (sunset)	1:28	1:11	1.0097
Spain	Alcúdia	19:37:33	20:30:34	20:31:19	20:32:03	20:48:01 (sunset)	1:29	1:10	1.0102
Spain	Segovia	19:35:47	20:31:09	20:31:37	20:32:06	21:19:04 (sunset)	0:57	1:43	1.003
Spain	Teruel	19:36:55	20:31:04	20:31:51	20:32:38	21:05:52	1:34	1:29	1.0105
Spain	Palma	19:38:03	20:31:05	20:31:53	20:32:41	20:49:22 (sunset)	1:36	1:11	1.0152
Spain	Guadalajara	19:36:23	20:31:21	20:31:55	20:32:28	21:14:38 (sunset)	1:07	1:38	1.0042
Spain	Cuenca	19:37:23	20:32:06	20:32:33	20:32:59	21:09:27 (sunset)	0:53	1:32	1.0027
Spain	Valencia	19:38:24	20:32:30	20:33:00	20:33:30	21:01:16 (sunset)	1:00	1:23	1.0036
Spain	Sant Antoni de Portmany	19:39:08	20:32:40	20:33:13	20:33:46	20:53:39 (sunset)	1:06	1:15	1.0047
Spain	Ibiza	19:39:15	20:32:45	20:33:18	20:33:49	20:53:00 (sunset)	1:04	1:14	1.0043

=== Places experiencing partial eclipse ===
Solar eclipse of 12 August 2026 (local times)
Country or territory	City or place	Start of partial eclipse	Maximum eclipse	End of partial eclipse	Duration of eclipse (hours & minutes)	Maximum coverage
Canada	Alert	12:09:49	13:09:31	14:08:56	1:59	93.42%
Svalbard and Jan Mayen	Longyearbyen	18:28:51	19:24:53	20:19:53	1:51	90.74%
Greenland	Danmarkshavn	16:26:59	17:26:23	18:24:29	1:58	99.12%
Greenland	Ittoqqortoormiit	15:36:14	16:37:02	17:35:50	2:00	99.67%
Iceland	Vestmannaeyjar	16:49:11	17:50:30	18:49:02	2:00	99.63%
Faroe Islands	Tórshavn	17:56:29	18:54:51	19:50:34	1:54	91.22%
Sweden	Stockholm	19:03:17	19:56:12	20:46:01 (sunset)	1:43	81.02%
Norway	Oslo	19:02:40	19:57:03	20:49:13	1:47	83.07%
Poland	Warsaw	19:14:37	20:02:54	20:06:41 (sunset)	0:52	81.72%
Denmark	Copenhagen	19:10:08	20:03:37	20:52:19 (sunset)	1:42	83.54%
Germany	Berlin	19:15:28	20:08:25	20:38:04 (sunset)	1:23	84.89%
Isle of Man	Douglas	18:11:47	19:09:10	20:03:29	1:52	92.39%
Austria	Vienna	19:22:03	20:10:14	20:13:39 (sunset)	0:52	84.89%
Ireland	Dublin	18:12:54	19:10:42	20:05:19	1:52	94.02%
Netherlands	Amsterdam	19:16:05	20:10:56	21:03:03	1:47	88.26%
Italy	Rome	19:32:47	20:11:38	20:14:38 (sunset)	0:42	69.17%
Czech Republic	Prague	19:19:22	20:11:48	20:26:34 (sunset)	1:07	86.29%
Slovenia	Ljubljana	19:25:51	20:12:28	20:15:44 (sunset)	0:50	84.25%
United Kingdom	London	18:17:19	19:13:19	20:06:21	1:49	91.42%
Belgium	Brussels	19:18:46	20:13:35	21:05:36	1:50	89.55%
Luxembourg	Luxembourg	19:20:56	20:15:11	20:58:21 (sunset)	1:37	89.68%
France	Paris	19:22:13	20:17:19	21:09:28	1:49	92.12%
Switzerland	Zurich	19:24:36	20:18:01	20:42:48 (sunset)	1:18	90.66%
Monaco	Monaco	19:30:44	20:23:58	20:38:45 (sunset)	1:08	95.01%
Andorra	Andorra la Vella	19:33:12	20:27:45	20:59:43 (sunset)	1:27	99.03%
Spain	Madrid	19:36:45	20:32:23	21:16:22 (sunset)	1:40	99.98%
Algeria	Algiers	18:42:36	19:33:45	19:42:40 (sunset)	1:00	96.09%
Portugal	Lisbon	18:39:17	19:36:07	20:29:08	1:50	94.52%
Gibraltar	Gibraltar	19:44:09	20:39:27	21:15:11 (sunset)	1:31	93.03%
Morocco	Casablanca	18:48:35	19:43:52	20:20:01 (sunset)	1:31	86.97%

== Eclipse parameters ==
The first table outlines times at which the Moon's penumbra or umbra attained the specific parameter, and the second table gives various other parameters pertaining to this eclipse.

Solar eclipse times
Event	Terrestrial Time (TD)
First penumbral external contact	15:35:23.9 TD
First umbral external contact	16:59:18.1 TD
First central line	17:01:16.5 TD
First umbral internal contact	17:03:19.0 TD
Equatorial conjunction	17:05:01.6 TD
Ecliptic conjunction	17:37:53.9 TD
Greatest duration	17:45:53.9 TD
Greatest eclipse	17:47:05.8 TD
Last umbral internal contact	18:31:21.6 TD
Last central line	18:33:21.7 TD
Last umbral external contact	18:35:17.7 TD
Last penumbral external contact	19:59:09.2 TD

Solar eclipse parameters
Parameter	Value
Eclipse magnitude	1.03863
Eclipse obscuration	1.07876
Gamma	0.89774
Sun right ascension	09h 29m 47.3s
Sun declination	+14 °48' 04.5"
Sun semi-diameter	15' 47.0"
Sun equatorial horizontal parallax	08.7"
Moon right ascension	09h 31m 17.3s
Moon declination	+15° 36' 58.5"
Moon semi-diameter	16'16.9"
Moon equatorial horizontal parallax	0°59'45.1"
ΔT	72.4 s

== Eclipse season ==
This eclipse was part of an eclipse season, a period, roughly every six months, when eclipses occur. Only two (or occasionally three) eclipse seasons occur each year, and each season lasts about 35 days and repeats just short of six months (173 days) later; thus two full eclipse seasons always occur each year. Either two or three eclipses happen each eclipse season. In the sequence below, each eclipse is separated by a fortnight.

Eclipse season of August 2026
12 August Descending node (new moon)	28 August Ascending node (full moon)
Total solar eclipse Solar saros 126	Partial lunar eclipse Lunar saros 138

== Related eclipses ==
=== Eclipses in 2026 ===
- An annular solar eclipse on February 17.
- A total lunar eclipse on March 3.
- A total solar eclipse on August 12.
- A partial lunar eclipse on August 28.

=== Metonic ===
- Preceded by: Solar eclipse of October 25, 2022
- Followed by: Solar eclipse of June 1, 2030

=== Tzolkinex ===
- Preceded by: Solar eclipse of July 2, 2019
- Followed by: Solar eclipse of September 23, 2033

=== Half-Saros ===
- Preceded by: Lunar eclipse of 7 August 2017
- Followed by: Lunar eclipse of 19 August 2035

=== Tritos ===
- Preceded by: Solar eclipse of September 13, 2015
- Followed by: Solar eclipse of July 13, 2037

=== Solar Saros 126 ===
- Preceded by: Solar eclipse of August 1, 2008
- Followed by: Solar eclipse of August 23, 2044

=== Inex ===
This eclipse is a member of Inex series 70.

- Preceded by: Solar eclipse of September 2, 1997
- Followed by: Solar eclipse of July 24, 2055

=== Triad ===
- Preceded by: Solar eclipse of October 12, 1939
- Followed by: Solar eclipse of June 13, 2113

=== Solar eclipses of 2026–2029 ===
This eclipse is a member of a semester series. An eclipse in a semester series of solar eclipses repeats approximately every 177 days and 4 hours (a semester) at alternating nodes of the Moon's orbit.

The partial solar eclipses on June 12, 2029 and December 5, 2029 occur in the next lunar year eclipse set.

Solar eclipse series sets from 2026 to 2029
Ascending node			Descending node		
Saros	Map	Gamma	Saros	Map	Gamma
121	February 17, 2026 Annular	−0.97427	126 León, Spain	August 12, 2026 Total	0.89774
131	February 6, 2027 Annular	−0.29515	136	August 2, 2027 Total	0.14209
141	January 26, 2028 Annular	0.39014	146	July 22, 2028 Total	−0.60557
151	January 14, 2029 Partial	1.05532	156	July 11, 2029 Partial	−1.41908

=== Saros 126 ===
This eclipse is a part of Saros series 126, repeating every 18 years, 11 days, and containing 72 events. The series started with a partial solar eclipse on March 10, 1179. It contains annular eclipses from June 4, 1323 through April 4, 1810; hybrid eclipses from April 14, 1828 through May 6, 1864; and total eclipses from May 17, 1882 through August 23, 2044. The series ends at member 72 as a partial eclipse on May 3, 2459. Its eclipses are tabulated in three columns; every third eclipse in the same column is one exeligmos apart, so they all cast shadows over approximately the same parts of the Earth.

The longest duration of annularity was produced by member 11 at 6 minutes, 30 seconds on June 26, 1359, and the longest duration of totality was produced by member 45 at 2 minutes, 36 seconds on July 10, 1972. All eclipses in this series occur at the Moon’s descending node of orbit.

Series members 36–57 occur between 1801 and 2200:
36	37	38
April 4, 1810	April 14, 1828	April 25, 1846
39	40	41
May 6, 1864	May 17, 1882	May 28, 1900
42	43	44
June 8, 1918	June 19, 1936	June 30, 1954
45	46	47
July 10, 1972	July 22, 1990	August 1, 2008
48	49	50
August 12, 2026	August 23, 2044	September 3, 2062
51	52	53
September 13, 2080	September 25, 2098	October 6, 2116
54	55	56
October 17, 2134	October 28, 2152	November 8, 2170
57
November 18, 2188

=== Metonic series ===
The metonic series repeats eclipses every 19 years (6939.69 days), lasting about 5 cycles. Eclipses occur in nearly the same calendar date. In addition, the octon subseries repeats 1/5 of that or every 3.8 years (1387.94 days). All eclipses in this table occur at the Moon's descending node.

22 eclipse events between June 1, 2011 and October 24, 2098
May 31–June 1	March 19–20	January 5–6	October 24–25	August 12–13
118	120	122	124	126
June 1, 2011	March 20, 2015	January 6, 2019	October 25, 2022	August 12, 2026
128	130	132	134	136
June 1, 2030	March 20, 2034	January 5, 2038	October 25, 2041	August 12, 2045
138	140	142	144	146
May 31, 2049	March 20, 2053	January 5, 2057	October 24, 2060	August 12, 2064
148	150	152	154	156
May 31, 2068	March 19, 2072	January 6, 2076	October 24, 2079	August 13, 2083
158	160	162	164	
June 1, 2087			October 24, 2098	

=== Tritos series ===
This eclipse is a part of a tritos cycle, repeating at alternating nodes every 135 synodic months (≈ 3986.63 days, or 11 years minus 1 month). Their appearance and longitude are irregular due to a lack of synchronization with the anomalistic month (period of perigee), but groupings of 3 tritos cycles (≈ 33 years minus 3 months) come close (≈ 434.044 anomalistic months), so eclipses are similar in these groupings.

Series members between 1801 and 2200
March 25, 1819 (Saros 107)	February 23, 1830 (Saros 108)	January 22, 1841 (Saros 109)		November 21, 1862 (Saros 111)
		August 20, 1895 (Saros 114)	July 21, 1906 (Saros 115)	June 19, 1917 (Saros 116)
May 19, 1928 (Saros 117)	April 19, 1939 (Saros 118)	March 18, 1950 (Saros 119)	February 15, 1961 (Saros 120)	January 16, 1972 (Saros 121)
December 15, 1982 (Saros 122)	November 13, 1993 (Saros 123)	October 14, 2004 (Saros 124)	September 13, 2015 (Saros 125)	August 12, 2026 (Saros 126)
July 13, 2037 (Saros 127)	June 11, 2048 (Saros 128)	May 11, 2059 (Saros 129)	April 11, 2070 (Saros 130)	March 10, 2081 (Saros 131)
February 7, 2092 (Saros 132)	January 8, 2103 (Saros 133)	December 8, 2113 (Saros 134)	November 6, 2124 (Saros 135)	October 7, 2135 (Saros 136)
September 6, 2146 (Saros 137)	August 5, 2157 (Saros 138)	July 5, 2168 (Saros 139)	June 5, 2179 (Saros 140)	May 4, 2190 (Saros 141)

=== Inex series ===
This eclipse is a part of the long period inex cycle, repeating at alternating nodes, every 358 synodic months (≈ 10,571.95 days, or 29 years minus 20 days). Their appearance and longitude are irregular due to a lack of synchronization with the anomalistic month (period of perigee). However, groupings of 3 inex cycles (≈ 87 years minus 2 months) comes close (≈ 1,151.02 anomalistic months), so eclipses are similar in these groupings.

Series members between 1801 and 2200
January 1, 1824 (Saros 119)	December 11, 1852 (Saros 120)	November 21, 1881 (Saros 121)
November 2, 1910 (Saros 122)	October 12, 1939 (Saros 123)	September 22, 1968 (Saros 124)
September 2, 1997 (Saros 125)	August 12, 2026 (Saros 126)	July 24, 2055 (Saros 127)
July 3, 2084 (Saros 128)	June 13, 2113 (Saros 129)	May 25, 2142 (Saros 130)
May 5, 2171 (Saros 131)	April 14, 2200 (Saros 132)	
