= Aveleda =

Aveleda may refer to the following places in Portugal:

- Aveleda (Braga), a civil parish in the municipality of Braga
- Aveleda (Bragança), a civil parish in the municipality Bragança
- Aveleda (Lousada), a civil parish in the municipality of Lousada
- Aveleda (Vila do Conde), a civil parish in the municipality of Vila do Conde

Other uses:

- Aveleda (winery), a winery in the Vinho Verde region of Portugal
