= Rihonor de Castilla =

Coordinates: 41°57′N 6°37′W

Rihonor de Castilla (Portuguese: Rio de Onor; Leonese: Ruidenor/Rueidenor [rwei.ðeˈno.ɾi]) is located in the shire of Senabria and belongs to the municipality of Pedralba de la Pradería, in the province of Zamora, Spain.

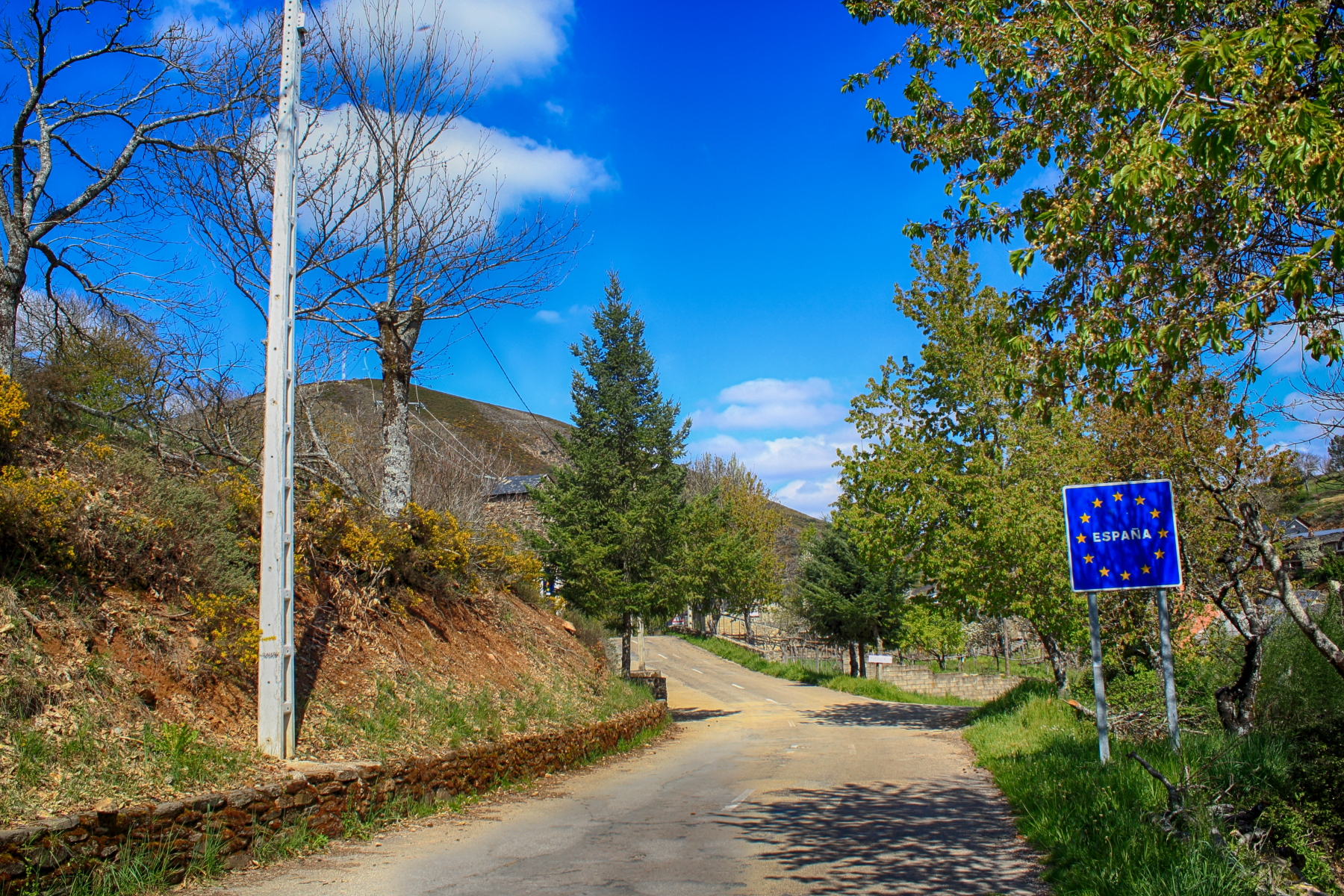
Entrance into Rihonor de Castilla, Spanish-Portuguese border.

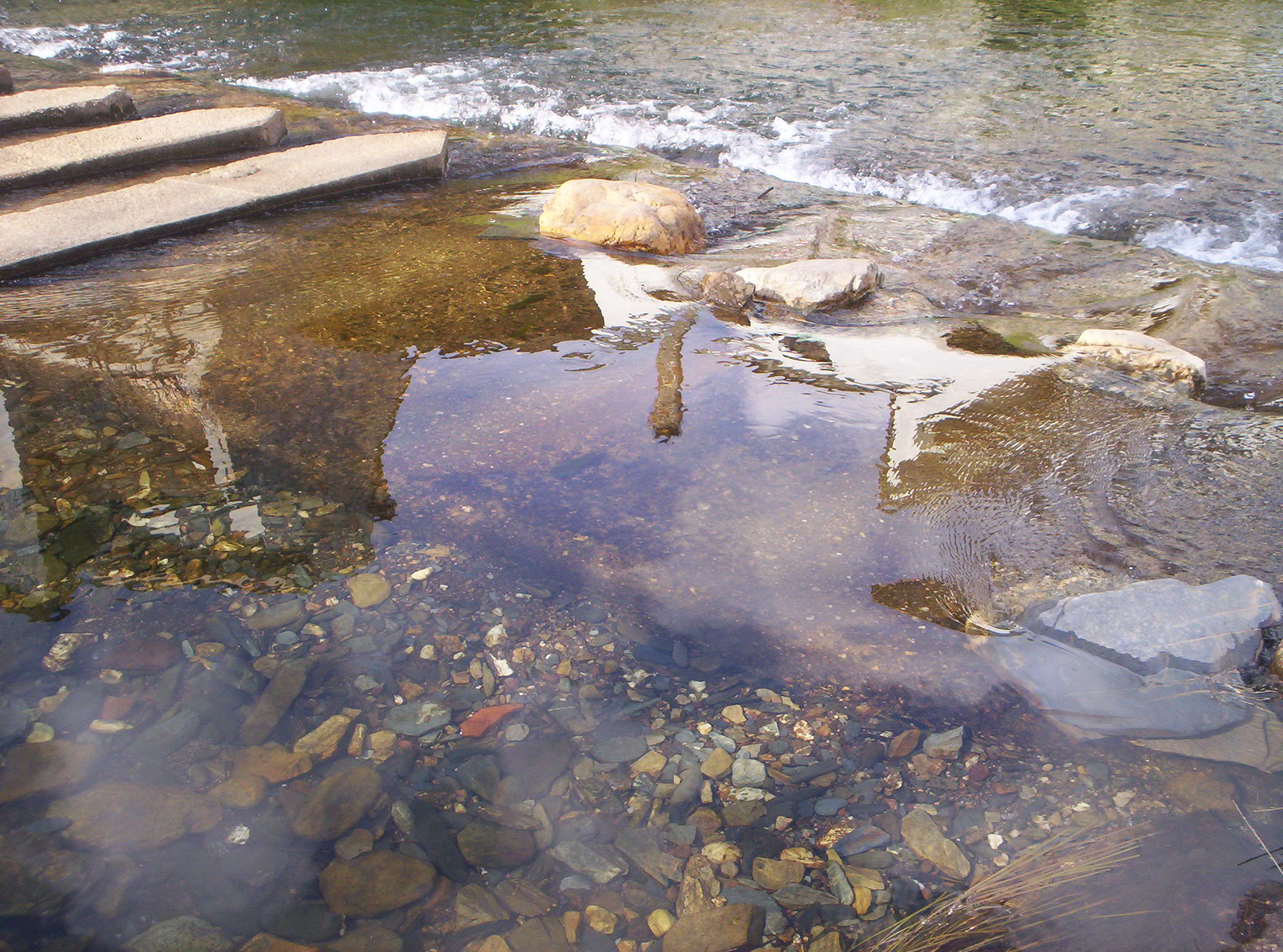
Detail of the Fontano River.

== Geography ==
The village is situated to the south of Sierra de la Culebra, next to the Portuguese border. The town is crossed by the river Fontano, also known as Comtensa or River Onor in its Portuguese stretch. It is 14 km from Puebla de Sanabria, 21 km from Pedralba de la Pradería, and 22 km from Bragança.

== Demography ==
The number of inhabitants has been waning slowly since the mid-20th century. In 2007, there were only 16 inhabitants in the village according to the Spanish Statistics National Institute. The beauty of the village and its landscapes, the traditions, and the enormous possibilities of development have attracted people wishing to settle in the village.

== Society ==
The main source of income has traditionally been commerce, since it is situated in the border between Spain and Portugal. At present, the economy is subsistence economy, because most plots of land are abandoned and most of its inhabitants are retired people. There is a grocery store providing the locals whereas the rest of the traders come from Portugal in their vehicles in order to sell their products.

The village has a unique special peculiarity in the Iberian Peninsula: actually, both the Portuguese village Rio de Onor and the Spanish village Rihonor de Castilla form only one village artificially divided by the borderline. For this reason, the inhabitants of these villages speak both Spanish and Portuguese influenced by the autochthonous language known as rihonorés, a dialect of the Leonese language.

The locals call the Spanish and Portuguese parts Povo de cima and Povo de abaixo respectively ('the town up' and 'the town down').

== See also ==
- Sanabria Lake Natural Park
