= Riunorese Leonese =

Variety of Leonese spoken in Portugal

Riunorese
- Native to: Portugal: Rio de Onor, Guadramil, Petisqueira, Deilão; Spain: Rihonor de Castilla
- Language family: Indo-European: Italic; Latino-Faliscan; Latin; Romance; Italo-Western; Western Romance; Ibero-Romance; West Iberian; Asturleonese; Leonese; Senabrese Leonese; Riunorese

Language codes
- ISO 639-3: –
- Glottolog: None
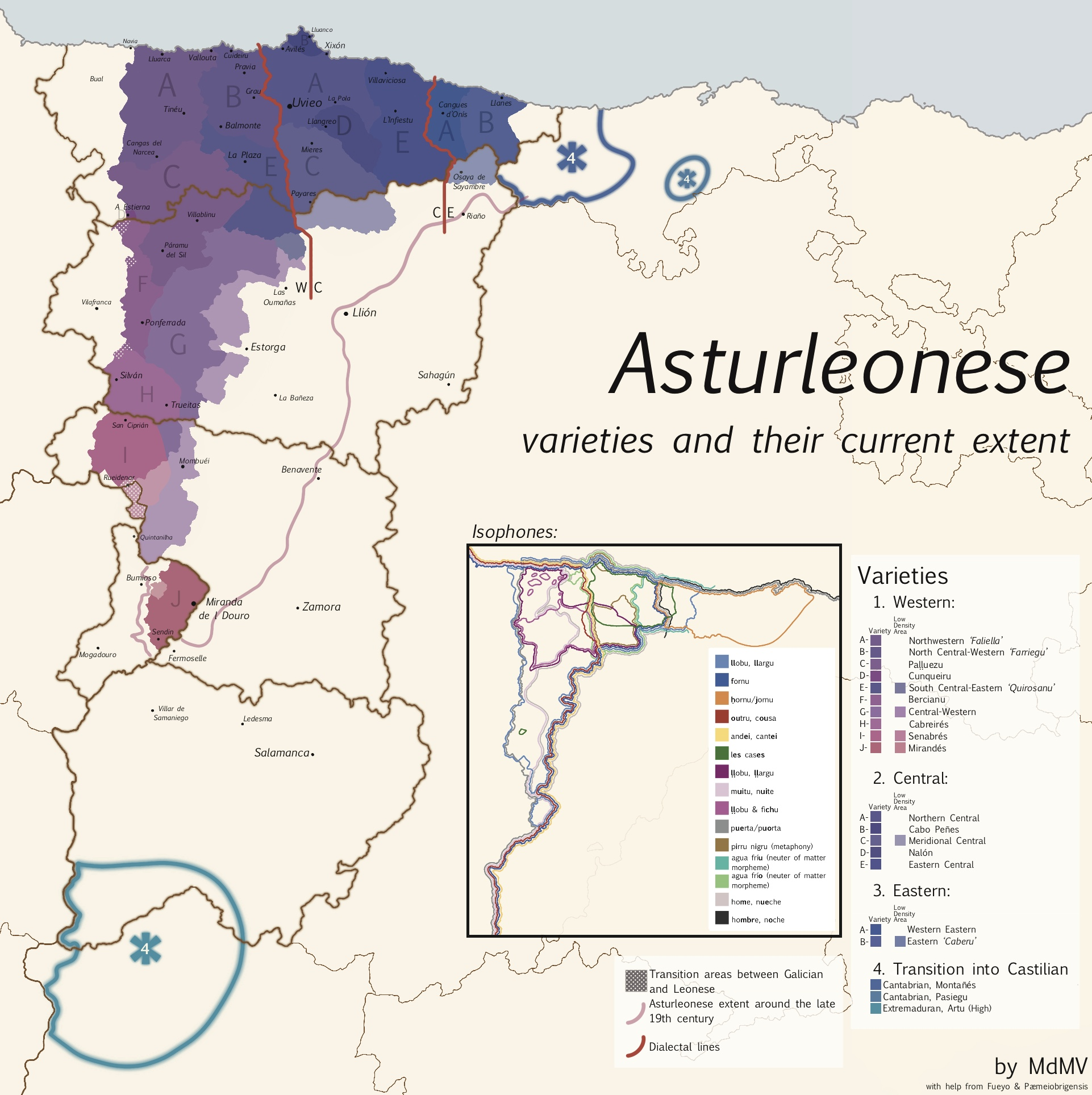
- A map of Asturleonese, where Riunorese is shown

Riunorese Leonese (also called Riodonorese or Lombadese) is one of the names given to the Leonese varieties spoken in Rio de Onor/Rihonor de Castilla, and, informally (and erroniously), by extension, in parts of the Lombada region in Portugal, belonging to the Senabrese dialect.

== Characteristics ==
- The Latin [e] appears more often as [je] than in other dialects; iêl for él 'him'.
- The diphthong [we] appears as [wo~we~wə].
- There is a larger quantity of contractions: à for a la 'to the' (f.), da for de la 'of the' (f.), like Portuguese and Galician but unlike other Leonese dialects.
- Nasalisation of diphthongs at the end of words, like matanun 'they killed'. Common in some Leonese dialects.
- Unlike Mirandese, but akin to the Leonese of Spain, there is no vocalisation of sibilants (lack of /z̻/, /z̺/ and /ʒ/). And, if such does occur, it's deemed as non-phonemic.
- Articles vary between el/la and o/a, but contractions usually lean towards Galician-Portuguese (do/da and no/na)

== Linguistic Classification ==
Being in between Galician, Portuguese and Leonese speaking areas, many consider it to be a transitional variety between Galician-Portuguese and Asturleonese, just like other regions between Galicia and Leon/Asturias. In other contexts, it's considered a "lusified zone" of Asturleonese. Similar classification disputes occur when discussing the Extremaduran and Cantabrian speaking areas

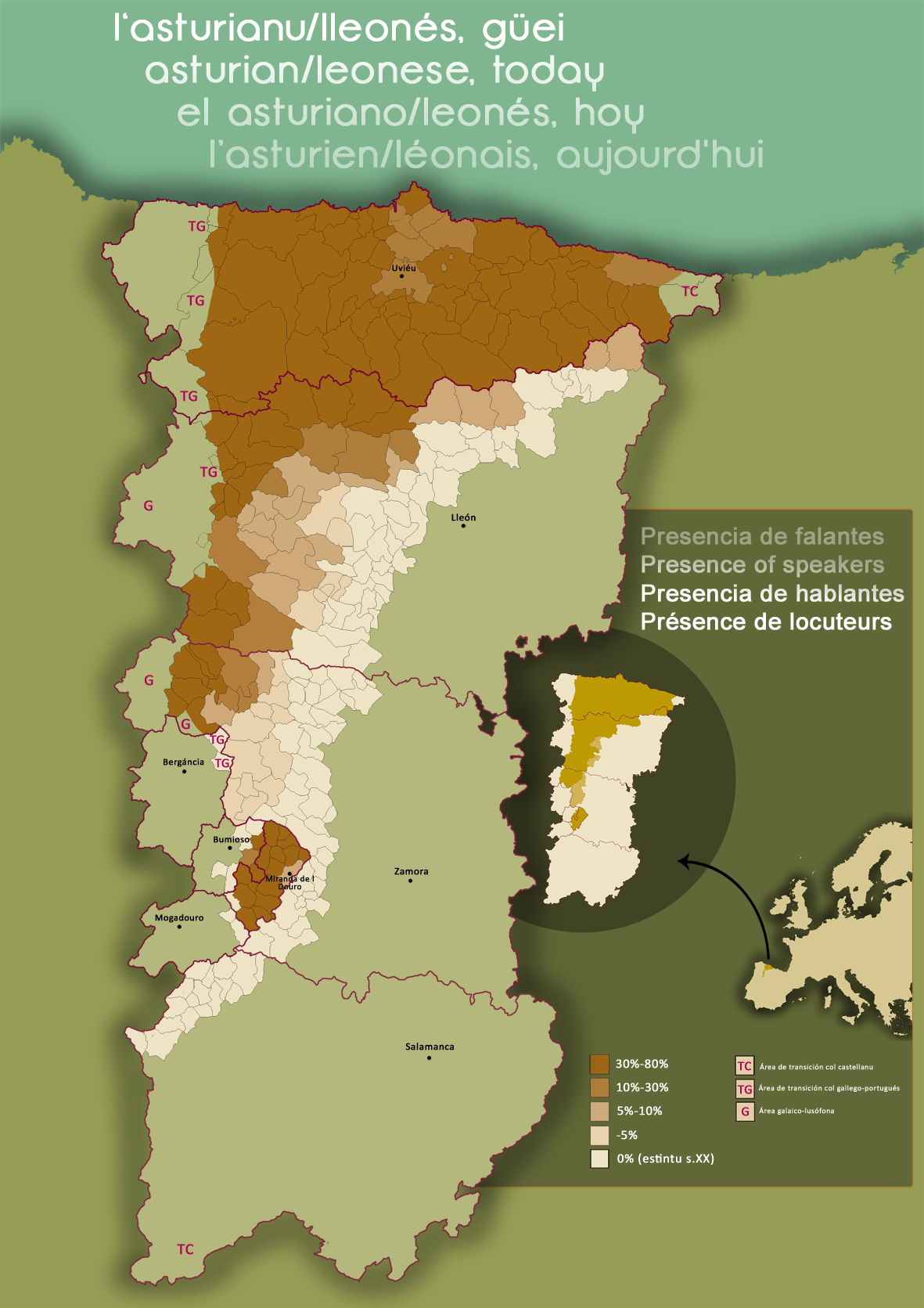
Percentage of Asturleonese speakers, according to Iniciativa pol Asturianu, where Riunorese is considered a transitional variety

== Writing system ==
There is no unified writing system for any Leonese varieties of Portugal, so, it is common to find texts written in a sort of pseudo-orthography with a portuguese basis.

== Sample text ==
História de um louco criminoso

'Story of a crazy criminal'; title in Portuguese. From the village of Riudenor (originally written with a heavily portuguese-based orthography).

Riunorese Leonese	Spanish	Portuguese	Leonese	Central Asturian	Mirandese	English
Un tal Miguel ficou de piquenu sin pai e a mai, marota, terminou-se di cassar cun al Tiu Domingo Tano. I iêl iera mau i batia-le al rapace i bateu-le na cabeça. Que iêl de piquenu iera listu i cun as porradas que le dou na cabeça pusu-se tonto.	Un tal Miguel se quedó de pequeño sin padre y la madre, traviesa, acabó casándose con el tío Domingo Tano. Y él era malo y le golpeaba al niño y le golpeó en la cabeza. Que él de pequeño era listo y con los golpes que le dio en la cabeza se puso tonto.	Um tal Miguel ficou de pequeno sem pai e a mãe, marota, acabou por casar com o Tio Domingo Tano. E ele era mau e batia ao rapaz e bateu-lhe na cabeça. Que ele desde pequeno era esperto e com as pancadas que lhe deu na cabeça fez-se tonto.	Un tal Miguel quedóu de piquenu ensin pai y la mai, cundanada, terminóu casandu cunu Tiu Domingo Tano. Ya él yera malu ya abatucaba-ye al rapaz, abatucóu-ye ena tiesta. Qu'él de piquenu yera llistu ya cunus guelpes que-ye diou na tiesta púnxuse fatu.	Un tal Miguel quedó de pequeñu ensin pá y la ma, condergada, terminó casando col tíu Domingo Tano. Y elli yera malu y golpiaba-y al rapaz y bató-y na tiesta. Qu'elli de pequeñu yera llistu y colos güelpes que-y dio na tiesta púnxose fatu.	Un tal Miguel quedou-se de pequeinho sien pai i la mai, marota, terminou-se por casar cul Tiu Domingo Tano. I el yera malo i batie-le al rapaç i batiu-le na cabeça. Qu'el de pequeinho yera lhisto i culas porradas que le dou na cabeça puso-se boubo.	A so called Miguel was left without a father as a child and the mother, naughty, ended up marrying Uncle Domingo Tano. And he was bad and hit the boy and hit him on the head. Though he was smart since he was little and the blows he gave him to the head made him stupid.

O casamento e a boda

'The marriage and the wedding'; title in Portuguese. From the village of Guadramil (transcribed with a less extremely portuguese orthography).

Guadramilese Leonese	English
Xuntaba-se o noibo y a noiba y entraba por a casa da família, y diz: «Manhana bamos-mos a casar, facemos o gusto que mos baias acumpanhar.» Salíen d'aquela, díban outra – cumo os ciganos a pedir la smola – y dicien-la na mesma. No pormanhana da fiesta da boda tornában a chamar-los: «Yá que yá stá o almuorzo feito y bá-se a comer» mientras eles stiberen a cumbersar, os outros díban a comer. Eles stában a ayunar. Y díban pa igreixa a casar-se. Adespois o cura staba no altar y diba a noiba, porque o noibo yá staba por lado dos homes. A noiba diba cuna madrina y o noibo diba cuno padrino. Y xuntában-se. Adepois, xuntában-se a borda do altar – enton inda nun había aneles – y adespois punha, agarraba-le a man, o cura, ataba-las así y diz el: «Tú, Xuan, tú stimas a Maria por tua sposa?" Él decía-le que si. Mas despois él decía-le para Maria: «Maria, tu stimas o Xuan por tou sposo?» Y ela decía que sí porque tinha-le buntade. Adepois, ataba-le a stola y rezaba-le eili quatro mentiras y tiraba-se. Ao benir pa casa, diba xente que cumbidou pa xantar, pa boda, diba l'acumpanhar atá casa. Tenia un par de quilos d’almendras y adepois daba-los a cada, una ou duas ou trés ou quatro. Y dában-le bino y pan. Y, os que yeran da boda facien baile y beilaban, os que nun yeran da boda díban para su casa. Puis yera así.	The husband and wife got together and they'd go in the family's house and say: "Tomorrow we will get married, we'd appreciate if you came to join us." They'd leave it [the house], go to another – like gypsies asking for alms – and they'd say it regardless. In the morning before the wedding ceremony they'd call them again: "Given the lunch is already done... and it will be eaten" While they speak, the others would go eat. They were having breakfast. And then, they'd go to the church to get married. Afterwards, the priest would be in the altar. And the wife would go [to the altar] because the husband was already beside the men. The wife would go with the godmother. and the husband with the godfather. And they'd come together. Afterwards, they'd get together in the edge of the altar – at the time there were no rings – and afterwards (he'd) grab his/her hand, the priest, (he'd) put them together and say: "You, Xuan, do you take Maria as your wife?" He'd say yes. But, afterwards he'd say to Maria: "Maria, do you take Xuan as your husband?" And she'd say yes because she wanted him so. Afterwards, (he'd) tie the stole and pray there four lies, and he'd leave. On the return home, there would come people who were invited to the dinner, for the wedding celebration, the accompanying would last until home. (He/She would) Have a couple quilos of almonds, and then he/she'd give them out to each one, one or two or three or four. And they'd give them wine and bread. And the ones of the celebration would dance, those who were not of the celebration would go to their homes. It was so.
