= Aveleda e Rio de Onor =

- Civil parish
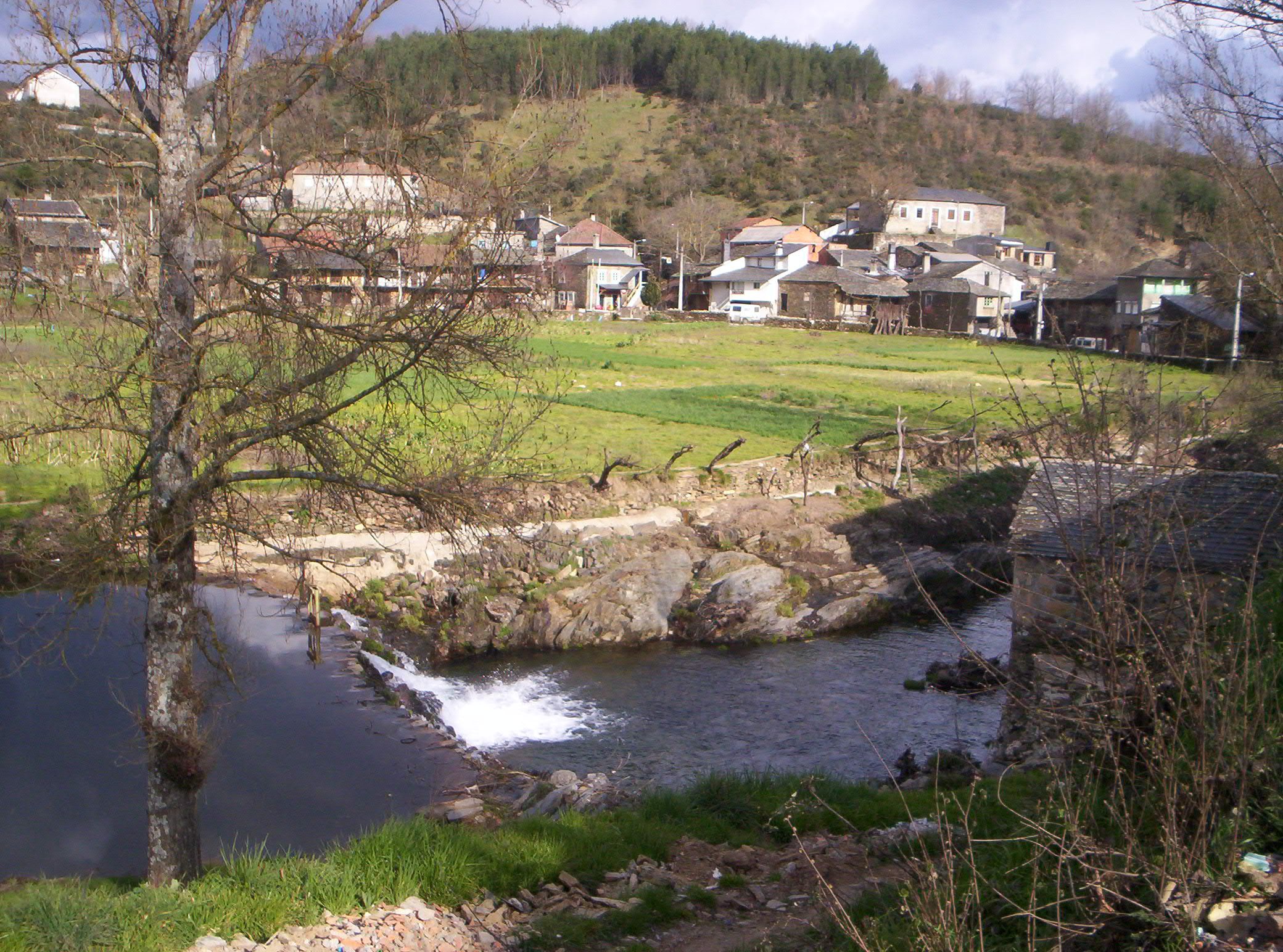
- Rio de Onor

- Location in Portugal
- Coordinates: 41.91°N 6.65°W
- Country: Portugal
- Region: Norte
- Intermunic. comm.: Terras de Trás-os-Montes
- District: Bragança
- Municipality: Bragança

Area
  - Total: 106.35 km^{2} (41.06 sq mi)

Population (2011)
  - Total: 272
  - Density: 2.56/km^{2} (6.62/sq mi)
- Time zone: UTC+00:00 (WET)
  - Summer (DST): UTC+01:00 (WEST)

Aveleda e Rio de Onor is a civil parish in the municipality of Bragança, Portugal. It was formed in 2013 by the merging of former parishes Aveleda and Rio de Onor (Spanish: Rihonor de Castilla; Leonese: Ruidenor/Rueidenor [rwei.ðeˈno.ɾi]). The population in 2011 was 272, in an area of 106.35 km^{2} (41.06 sq mi).

== Language ==
Portuguese is spoken by everyone. Historically the main language was Rionorese, an Astur-Leonese language, which is almost extinct today.

== See also ==
- Rihonor de Castilla
