= Aveleda (Bragança) =

- Civil parish
- Location in Portugal
- Coordinates: 41.8978°N 6.6581°W
- Country: Portugal
- Region: Norte
- Municipality: Bragança
- Disbanded: 2013

Area
  - Total: 62.20 km^{2} (24.02 sq mi)

Population (2011)
  - Total: 196
  - Density: 3.2/km^{2} (8.2/sq mi)
- Time zone: UTC+00:00 (WET)
  - Summer (DST): UTC+01:00 (WEST)
- Postal code: 5300 - 411
- Patron: São Cipriano

Aveleda is a former freguesia ("civil parish") in the municipality of Bragança, Portugal. In 2013, the parish merged into the new parish Aveleda e Rio de Onor. The population in 2011 was 196, in an area of 62.20 km^{2}. It is situated close to the northern border with Spain.

== History ==
The parish of Aveleda derives its name from the village, whose toponymy has a number of significances. For one, there is the Roman interpretation, derived from the Roman Avé Leda, which means beautiful place, while others assume that the name was derived from Veleda, a venerated Visigothic or Suebic priest of the 4th century. Another interpretation suggests that the name was derived from ave feliz.

What is certain, is that this name only appeared during the 1250 Inquirições of Afonso III. This is because the area around Aveleda was under the protection of Spanish monasteries of Moreirola and San Martin de Castanheda. It was there that the celebrated Abbott of Baçal was parish priest (between 1896 and 1910), always travelling by foot and complying a dossier of his thoughts in Memórias Arqueológico: Históricas do Distrito de Bragança, a twelve-tome work detailing the municipal history. In this case, he referred specifically to the village of Varge (on the southern perimeter of Aveleda), which was derived from varzena or varcena, a medieval term to designate artificial or natural low wetlands. The wells in this area are also referred to by the local peoples as varja or varjas, literally fish traps.

The Matriz Church, on a slight elevation, dates back to the 18th century.

The bridge that crosses the Pepim River in Aveleda, constructed on stone, was completed in 1952.

== Geography ==
Aveleda is located along the Portuguese-Spanish border within the Parque Natural de Montesinho (Montesinho Natural Park), three kilometres northeast of the municipal seat of Bragança.

It is characterized by hills and river-valleys, along a plateau with an average of 500 metres altitude. It is crossed by two water courses that flow from north to south: the Ribeira das Igrejas, which crosses the village of Varge, and the Ribeira de Pepim, which intersects the village of Aveleda. Both ravines spring from the Serra de Pedralba, crossing from Spain, and flow as tributaries of the Sabor River.

== Architecture ==
There are several vestiges of historical architecture and rural constructions in this parish, that include: the two main historical springs/wells (Fonte da Pinela and Fonte d'Aldeia), which were subterranean channels of potable water; watermills and ancient blacksmith's forge. The following were classified by IGESPAR as national monuments or architecturally significant heritage:

=== Civic ===
- Fountain of Pinela (Portuguese: Fonte da Pinela)

=== Religious ===
- Church of São Cipriano (Portuguese: Igreja Paroquial de Aveleda/Igreja de São Cipriano), built in the 17th century, the parochial church of Aveleda was directed by the abbey Meixedo, before falling under the administration of Miranda;
- Church of São Miguel (Portuguese: Igreja Paroquial de Varge/Igreja de São Miguel/Igreja de Varge), a relatively small parish, the church of Varge had little more than 40 parishioners at the time of its institution, during the 17th century;
- Chapel of São Sebastião (Portuguese: Capela de São Sebastião/Capelo de Santo Padre), constructed during the 18th century, the chapel has been a site for pilgrims, first for São Julião, but later Santo Padre (celebrated on 20 January), during the winter seasons. A register of azulejo is located above the main portal.
