= Sanabria (comarca) =

Comarca in the province of Zamora, Spain

Location of the comarca in Zamora Province.

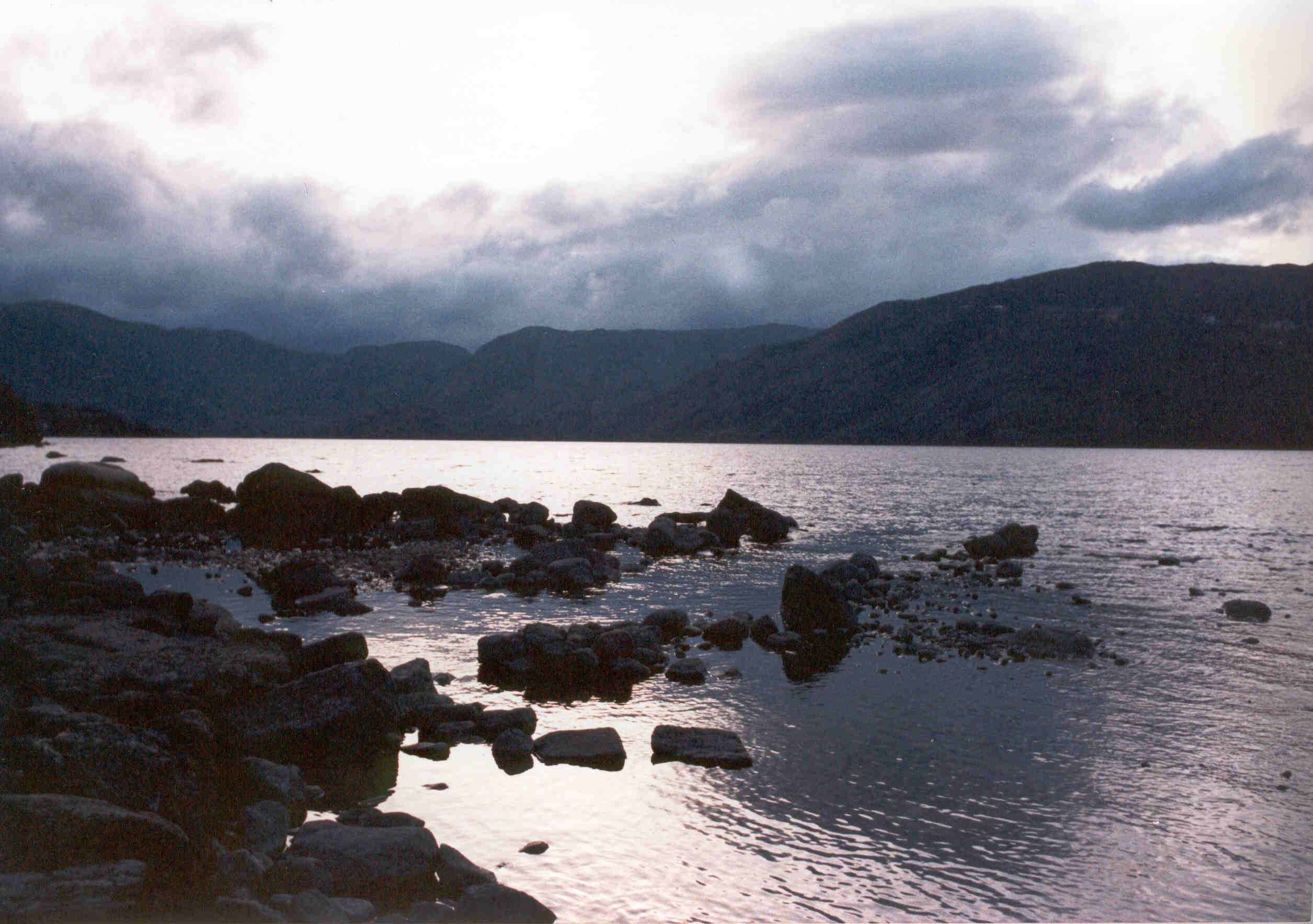
Sanabria Lake, one of the very few natural lakes of the Iberian Peninsula

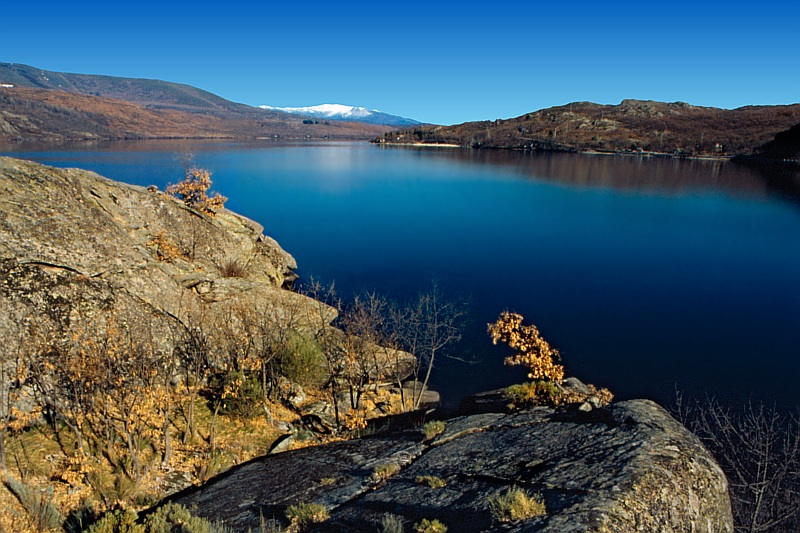
Another view of Sanabria Lake

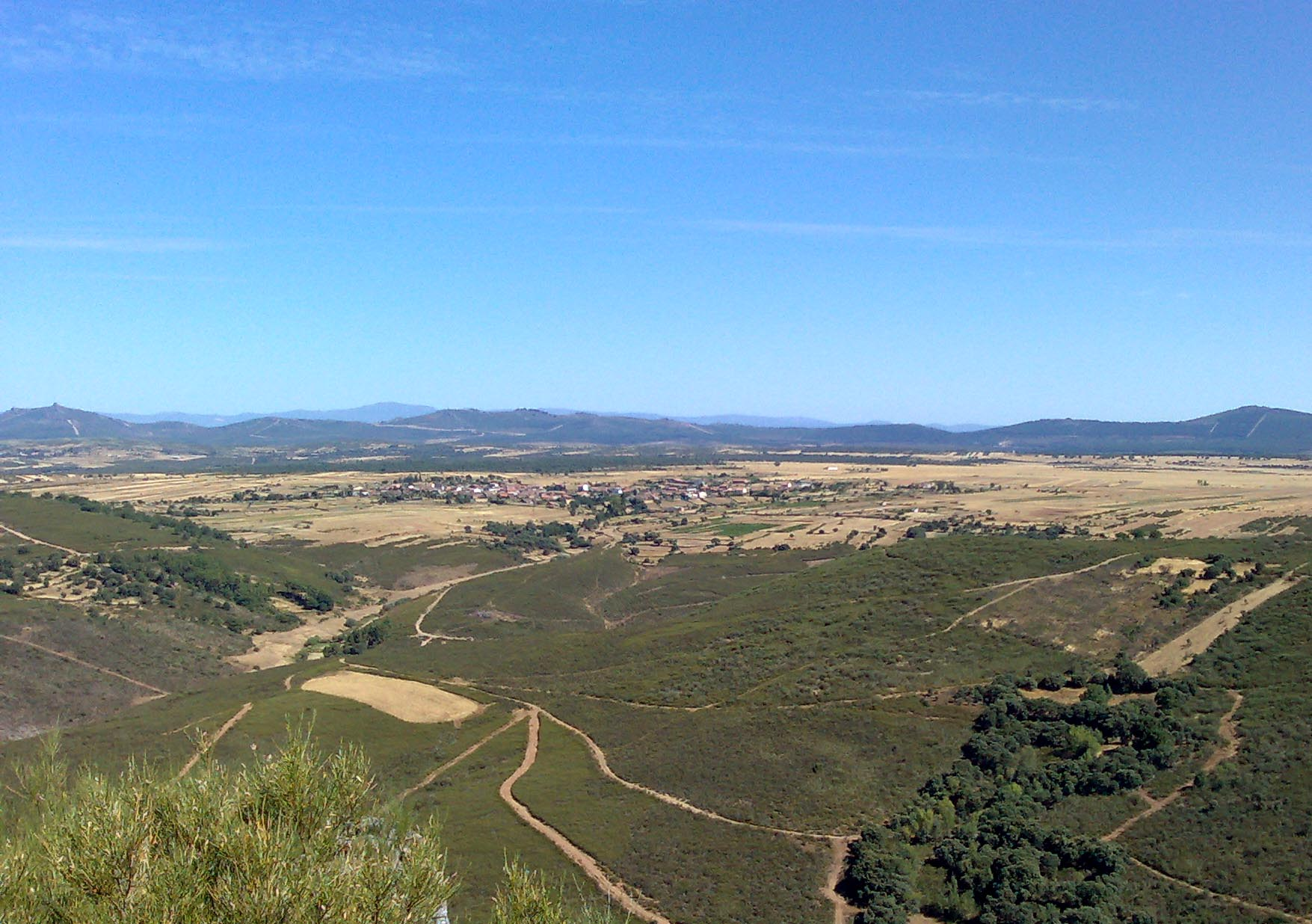
View of the Sanabria comarca with the Sierra de la Culebra mountain range in the background

Sanabria (Spanish pronunciation: [saˈnaβɾja], A Seabra in the Galician language, Senabria in Leonese language) is a comarca in the northwest of the province of Zamora, western Spain. It borders Portugal to the south, Orense to the west and León to the north. It belongs to the Autonomous Region of Castilla y León.

== Overview ==
The Sierra de la Cabrera Baja forms a natural boundary with Leon Province in the north, Sierra Segundera with Galicia in the west, and Sierra de la Culebra and Sierra de la Gamoneda with the Bragança District of Portugal in the south and southwest. The comarcas of La Carballeda and Tierra del Pan are to the east. The most famous place in the comarca is the Sanabria Lake (Lago de Sanabria), the biggest glacial lake in the Iberian Peninsula, with a surface of 368 hectares (910 acres) which is now within the limits of the Sanabria Lake Natural Park. The lake was declared a Natural Park in 1978. The capital of the comarca is Puebla de Sanabria.

The Sanabria comarca is one of the few areas of Western Europe with a sizeable population of wild wolves, which live in the Sierra de la Culebra mountain range.

== Municipalities ==
Sanabria is divided in 15 municipalities, which in turn include several districts or towns, of which some belong to the nearby region of La Carballeda. In the next table municipalities are listed, showing the area of each municipality in square kilometers, population according to the last INE census and the towns which are included on every municipality:

Municipality	Area	Population	Towns
Asturianos	42,60	264	Asturianos, Cerezal de Sanabria, Entrepeñas, Lagarejos de la Carballeda, Rioconejos, Villar de los Pisones
Cobreros	77,70	588	Avedillo de Sanabria, Barrio de Lomba, Castro de Sanabria, Cobreros, Limianos de Sanabria, Quintana de Sanabria, Riego de Lomba, San Martín del Terroso, San Miguel de Lomba, San Román de Sanabria, Santa Colomba de Sanabria, Sotillo de Sanabria, Terroso
Galende	90,26	1141	Cubelo, Galende, Ilanes, Moncabril, Pedrazales, El Puente, Rabanillo, Ribadelago, Ribadelago Nuevo, San Martín de Castañeda, Vigo
Hermisende	108,75	251	Castrelos, Castromil, Hermisende, San Ciprián, La Tejera
Lubián	94,39	326	Aciberos, Chanos, Hedroso, Las Hedradas, Lubián, Padornelo
Palacios de Sanabria	37,01	260	Otero de Sanabria, Palacios de Sanabria, Remesal, Vime de Sanabria
Pedralba de la Pradería	105,11	292	Calabor, Lobeznos, Pedralba de la Pradería, Rihonor de Castilla, Santa Cruz de Abranes
Pías	43,91	138	Barjacoba, Pías, Villanueva de la Sierra
Porto de Sanabria	200,82	188	Porto de Sanabria
Puebla de Sanabria	81,39	1460	Castellanos, Puebla de Sanabria, Robledo, Ungilde
Requejo de Sanabria	46,10	149	Requejo de Sanabria
Robleda-Cervantes	32,47	448	Barrio de la Gafa, Barrio Lagarejos, Cervantes, Ferreros, Paramio, Robleda, Sampil, San Juan de la Cuesta, Triufé, Valdespino
Rosinos de la Requejada	154,78	387	Anta de Rioconejos, Carbajalinos, Doney de la Requejada, Escuredo, Gusandanos, Monterrubio, Rionegrito, Rosinos de la Requejada, Santiago de la Requejada, Villarejo de la Sierra
San Justo	75,12	234	Barrio de Rábano, Coso, Rábano de Sanabria, Rozas, San Ciprián, San Justo
Trefacio	25,48	186	Cerdillo, Murias, Trefacio, Villarino de Sanabria

== See also ==
- Sierra de la Cabrera
- Peña Trevinca
- Moncalvo
- Galende
