= Entrepeñas, Spain =

Entrepeñas
- Location in Spain
- Coordinates: 42°01′55″N 6°28′28″W
- Country: Spain
- Autonomous community: Castile and León
- Province: Zamora
- Municipality: Asturianos

Population (2014)
  - Total: 54
- Time zone: UTC+1 (CET)
  - Summer (DST): UTC+2 (CEST)

Entrepeñas is a locality located within the municipality of Asturianos, province of Zamora, Castile and León, Spain. According to the 2014 census (INE), the locality has a population of 54 inhabitants.

== Geography ==
Located in the "comarca" (district) of Sanabria, Northeast of the province. Belonging to the Asturianos municipality along with the townships: Cerezal, Lagarejos, Rioconejos and Villar de los Pisones.

Entrepeñas is located near the Cernadilla Reservoir.

== History ==
During the Middle Ages, Entrepeñas was integrated into the Kingdom of León, Whose Monarchs had committed to the repopulation of the municipality as part of the repopulation efforts of Sanabria. After the independence of Portugal of Kingdom of León in 1143, Entrepeñas suffered due to its geographical position in the conflicts between the Kingdoms of León and Portugal in a bid for control over the border, a situation which stabilized at the dawn of the XIII Century.

Previously, in the modern era Entrepeñas was one of the municipalities integrated in the Tierras del Conde de Benavente provinces. Nonetheless in the restructuring of the provinces and the creation of the actual provinces in 1833. Entrepeñas went on to form part of the Province of Zamora, within the Region of Leon. Integrating in 1834 in the judicial party of Puebla de Sanabria

Finally, by the turn of 1850, the Historical Municipality integrated itself with that of Asturianos.

== Monuments and Places of Interest ==
The two landmarks most representative of Entrepeñas are its parish church and its chapel. The former, the Parish Church of Nuestra Señora de la Asunción, partially destroyed in a fire, conserves its Baroque styles in its, cylindrical pillars and its southern frame, with a basket-handle arch, framed with pilasters and a pediment finish.

== See also ==
- List of municipalities in Zamora
