= Peñas de la Cerca =

Historical site in Spain

Peñas de la Cerca is an Iron Age hillfort, in the province of Zamora, north-western Spain. It is near a hamlet called Rionegrito de Sanabria (municipio of Rosinos de la Requejada). Situated in a mountainous region on the north-western edge of the Northern Sub-Plateau, the site controls the middle of the Tera valley, between the natural shires of Sanabria (high and medium mountain) and Carballeda (plateau).

The site was excavated in two consecutive seasons in 2007 and 2008 by the PIDPAPZ project scientific team and supervised by the archaeologists Jose Carlos Sastre Blanco (University of Granada) and Oscar Rodriguez Monterrubio (UNED). Archaeological finds place this site in an intermediate period between the 1st and the 2nd Iron Age about the 7th century BC. It covers an area of around 2 hectares and settlement is distributed on tells, being the highest where a major number of dwelling structures and artefacts have been identified.

== Defensive system ==
Excavations and surveys on the site have made possible the identification of several enclosures covering the north slope of the hill where the settlement was constructed. The inhabited zone was complex fortified area with two parallel walls (the internal and the external walls) and an interior highpoint surrounded by another wall (the top-hill wall). A line of more than seven tells (uninhabited) were constructed to alter the surface of the northern slope and to prevent a straight access to the inhabited nucleus, each tell is supported by a constructive wall creating a system of walled tells.

The excavation areas 1 and 4 unearthed the real structure of the walls: simple-faced walls with heterogeneous rough stone. This with a linear morphology and an enclosure adapted to the terrain sets the defensive system in Iron Age Chronologies. Without more accurate findings marking a concrete date, the chronology could cover an enormous gap of time similar to what happens in other northwestern Spanish hillforts belonging to the so-called Hillforts culture (Cultura Castreña)

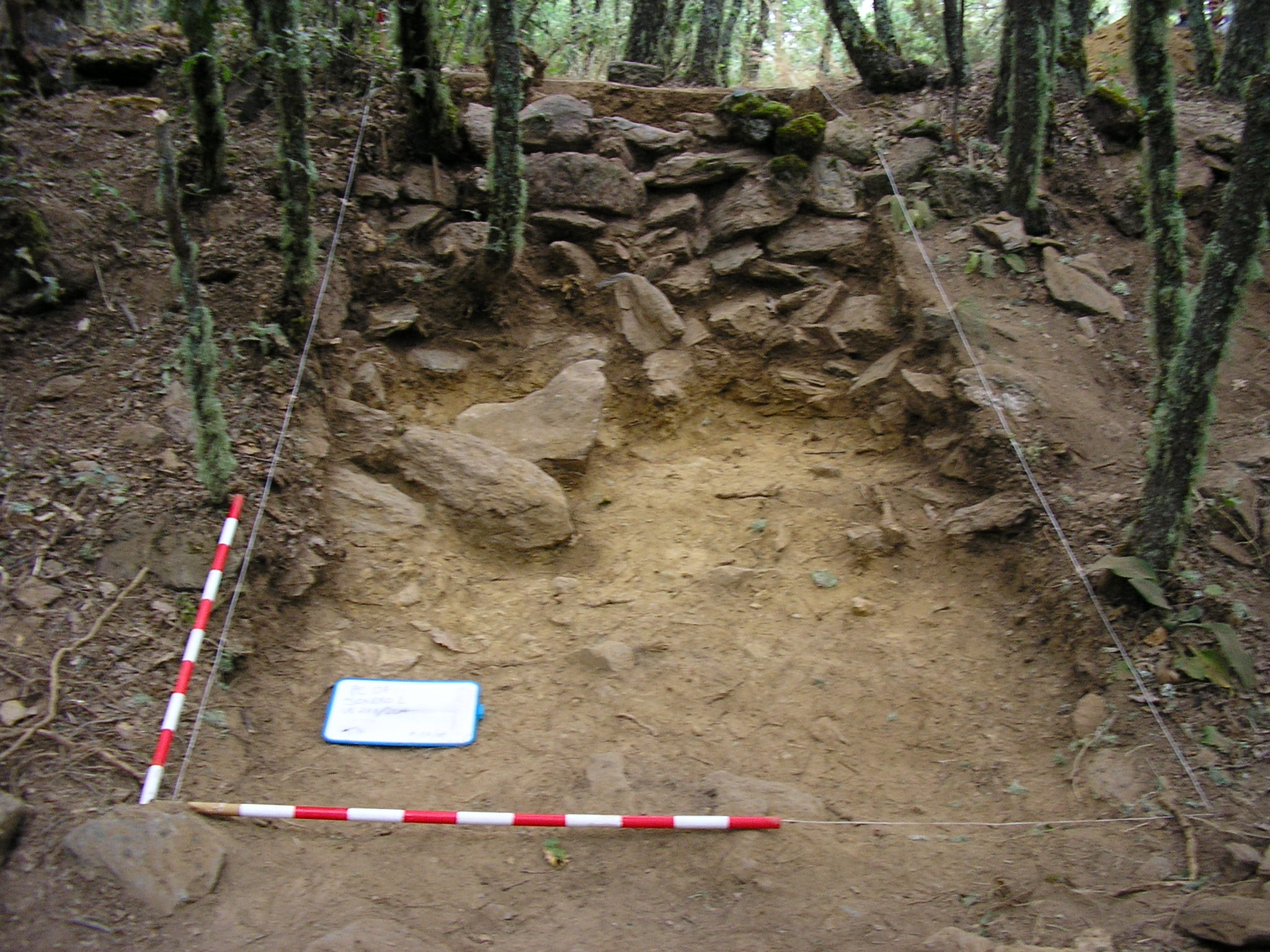
Wall of Peñas de la Cerca

== Dwelling area ==
Excavation areas 2 and 3, on the second tell between the top-hill wall and the interior wall, had unearthed housing materials and structures related with three different periods of occupation of the settlement. The most ancient dwelling belongs to a period just before the 2nd Iron Age, so before the 6th century BC, because the level was discovered under pieces of metalworking clearly identified as materials from the transitional period between the 1st and the 2nd Iron Age. This first and the most ancient dwelling so far is defined by an ashen level where remains of wooden structures, grain store pits, plinth stones and a depot of burnt nuts (hazelnuts and acorns). An intermediate period of dwelling is located just above, this is the best studied and the most known period because it is the widest layer discovered so far. It is a hut-like structure with a uniform ground prepared to be dwelt and furnish with the basic Iron Age housing elements: Pit holes to support the structure, millstones, hand-mills, metalworking (bronze), remains of a bonfire, grain store pits and pieces of pottery. The chronology of this period is between the 6th century BC and the 2nd half to the 2nd Iron Age. More than 30 centimetres above, a third and more recent layer was discovered with a clear interruption in dwelling. This third and recent is belonging to the late 2nd Iron Age. This is a period identified by pieces of pottery but no structures were found in it. No Roman remains were found in the site so far so the settlement was probably abandoned (or not romanised) after the 1st century BC, in favour of other close sites as the gold mines of Los Corralones, Santo Toribio Hill or the valley of Vidriales (Eastwards into the plateau)

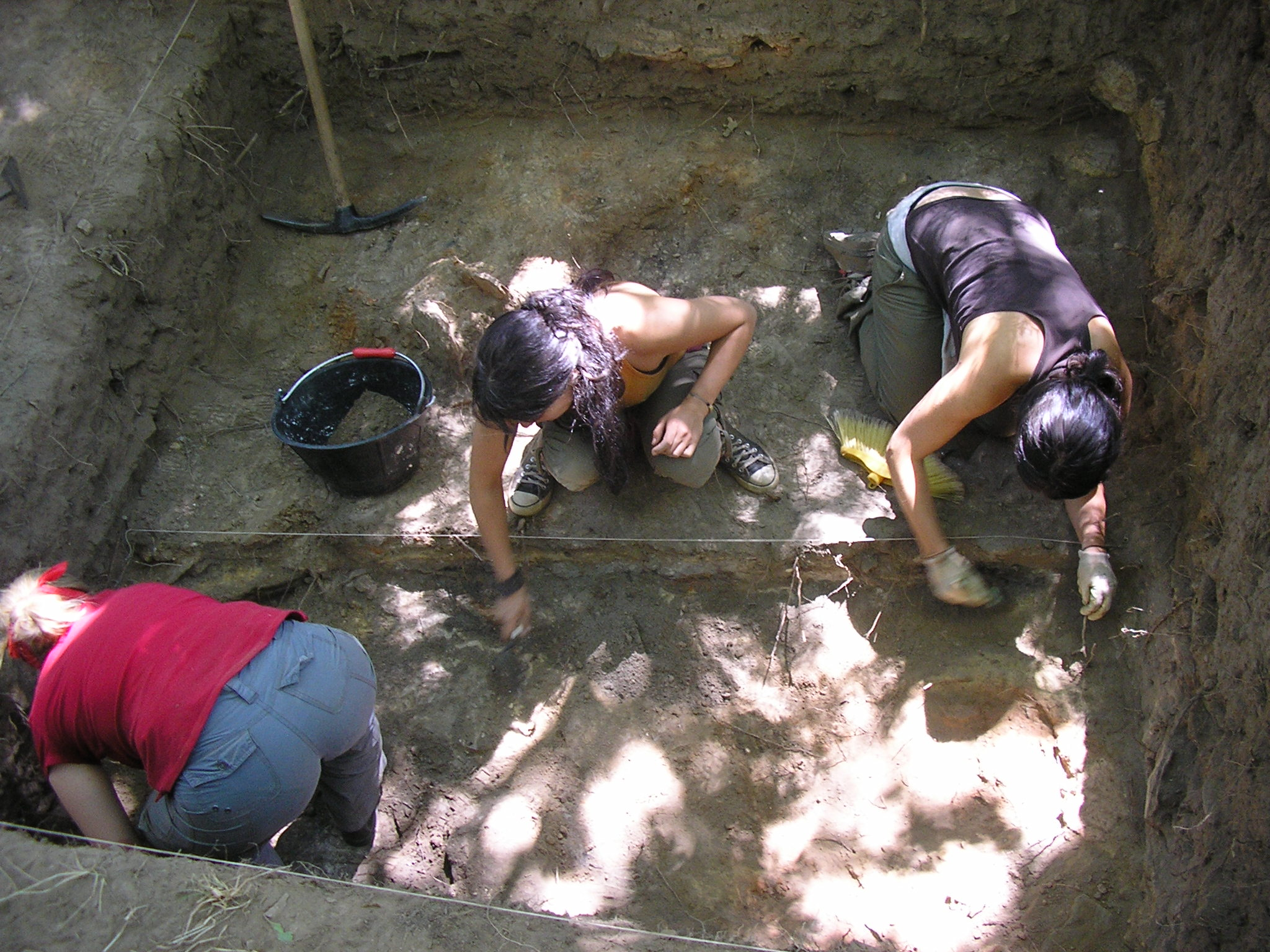
Trabajos de excavación de la cabaña de Peñas de la Cerca

== Materials and findings ==
Last campaigns have dug up a large number of materials which contribute to know more precisely the Iron Age living standards. Among the most significant materials: a bronze brooch (fibula) as a sample of metalworking used in clothing found in a primary location (dwelling): flint arrow heads teach us about hunting and weaponry; millstones and hand-mills used to mill grain and seeds to obtain flour and pastes; pieces of pottery used in cooking, serving or storing, of many shapes (bowls, plates, pots, vases and jars), plain and decorated with engravings, printed or polishings. All of them are forming part of a typical set of materials from the Iron Age, more concretely Hillforts culture. One of the most astonishing aspects of the site is the large number of stone tools, more common during the Neolithic but still working during the Late Prehistory, instruments such as polishers, cutters, mortars, hand-mills, millstones, bullets, weights used in looms (weaving), roofs (construction) or nets (fishing), more than 90 pieces have so far been found.

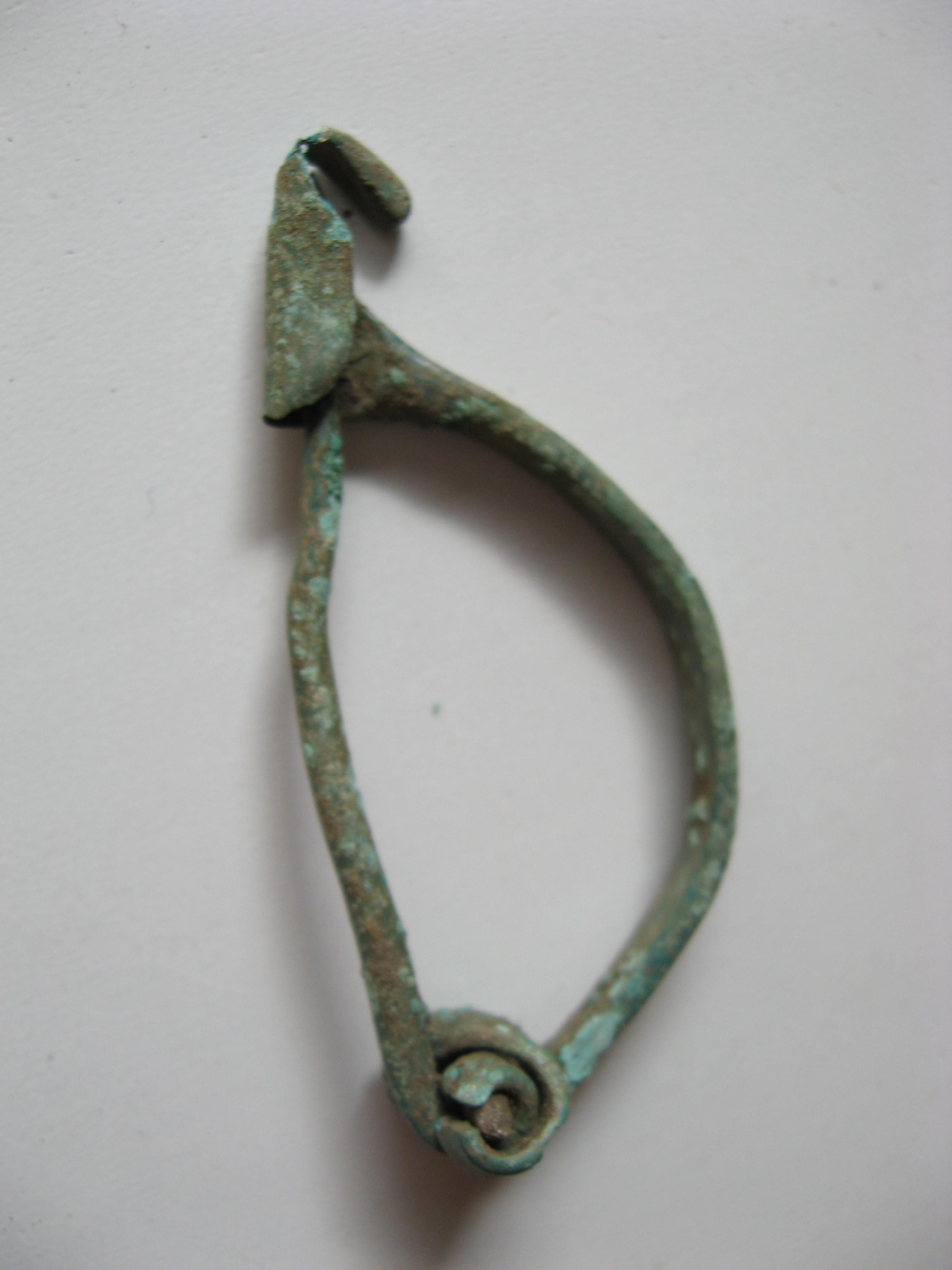
fíbula de bronce de Peñas de la Cerca

== Engravings ==
The engravings were firstly ascribed to Middle Ages when former studies were carried out during the 1980s. But recent studies show that no medieval materials are associated with the site, that is the reason to consider the set of engravings as a piece of art from the late prehistoric periods, popularly known as petroglyphs (engravings made on stones). The panel of Peñas de la Cerca is known since the 80's and it formed by three elements: A horseshoe, a double cross and a stick, 2008 campaign discovered that the panel was bigger than what was supposed in the 80's and two more symbols were discovered down the three we knew. A second horseshoe and another cross-like symbol. Techniques of engraving are also different the three at the top were made by friction but the two new ones were made with a burin or graver. Probably the new discoveries belong to a more modern copy or reinterpretation of the images and symbols at the top of the panel, visibly more ancient.

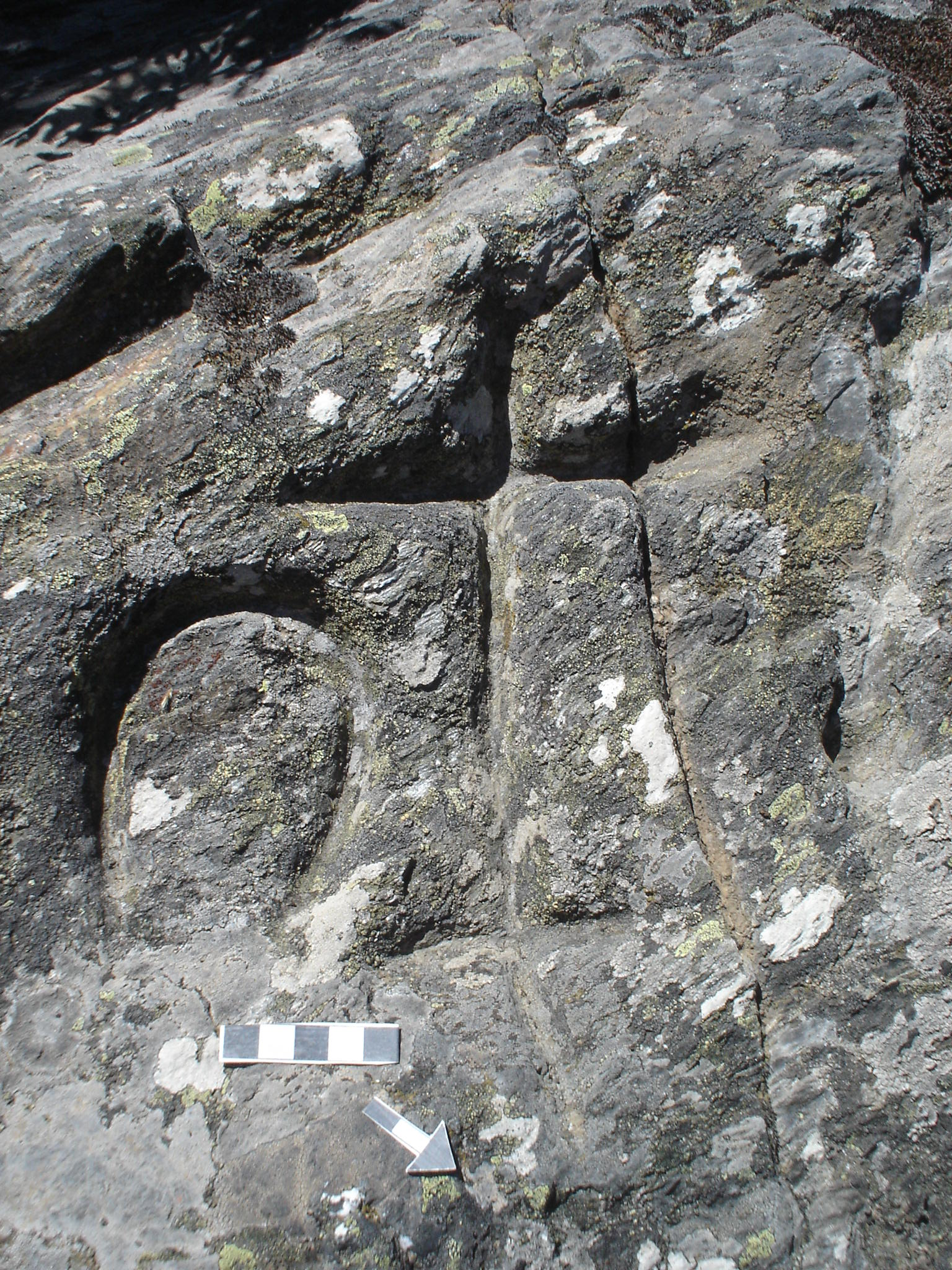
Grabados Peñas de la Cerca

== Bibliography ==
Esparza Arroyo, A. (1986): Los castros de la edad del hierro del noroeste de Zamora. Instituto de estudios zamoranos Florián de Ocampo (Diputación de Zamora), Zamora 1986.

Rodríguez Monterrubio, O. y Sastre Blanco, J. C. (2008): Aproximación a los trabajos de investigación en los Castros de Peñas de la Cerca y El Castillón (Zamora). I Jornada de Jóvenes en investigación arqueológica: Dialogando con la cultura material. Universidad Complutense de Madrid. Madrid. pp: 271 – 278.

Rodríguez Monterrubio, O y Sastre Blanco, J. C. (2013): El hábitat y la defensa en la Edad del Hierro. El castro de Peñas de la Cerca (Zamora). Arqueología en el valle del Duero. Del Neolítico a la Antigüedad Tardía: Nuevas perspectivas (Coord. José Carlos Sastre Blanco, Raúl Catalán Ramos y Patricia Fuentes Melgar). Ediciones La Ergástula. Madrid. Págs: 109-118
