= Sanabria AV railway station =

Building in Zamora Province, Spain

Sanabria AV

General information
- Location: Otero de Sanabria, Palacios de Sanabria, Province of Zamora; Spain
- Coordinates: 42.044523°N 6.564273°W
- Owner: Adif
- Line: Olmedo–Zamora–Galicia high speed line
- Platforms: 2

History
- Opened: 22 July 2021
Location

The Sanabria AV railway station (Sanabria Alta Velocidad) is a railway station located in Otero de Sanabria, Palacios de Sanabria, in Castile and León, Spain. Part of the Olmedo–Zamora–Galicia high speed line, it is served by Alvia services.

== History ==
Despite the sparse population in the area, the construction of at least a halt was necessary due to technical reasons. The erection of a station near the tiny hamlet of Otero de Sanabria was thus decided. The work was tendered on 10 October 2017. Building works started by June 2018. It consists of two platforms 416 meters long and seven meters wide. The station was inaugurated by Minister Raquel Sánchez on 22 July 2021. It brings the Comarca of Sanabria to about an hour and 50 minutes from Madrid. Located not far from the Portuguese border, it may also be able to serve the Portuguese city of Bragança.

| Preceding station | Renfe Operadora | Following station |
|---|---|---|
| Zamora towards Madrid Chamartín | Alvia | A Gudiña-Porta de Galicia towards Ferrol |
| Zamora towards Madrid Chamartín | Alvia | A Gudiña-Porta de Galicia towards Lugo |
| Zamora towards Madrid Chamartín | Alvia | A Gudiña-Porta de Galicia towards Pontevedra |
| Zamora towards Madrid Chamartín | Alvia | A Gudiña-Porta de Galicia towards Vigo-Urzáiz |
