= Vega de Tera disaster =

1959 dam failure in Spain

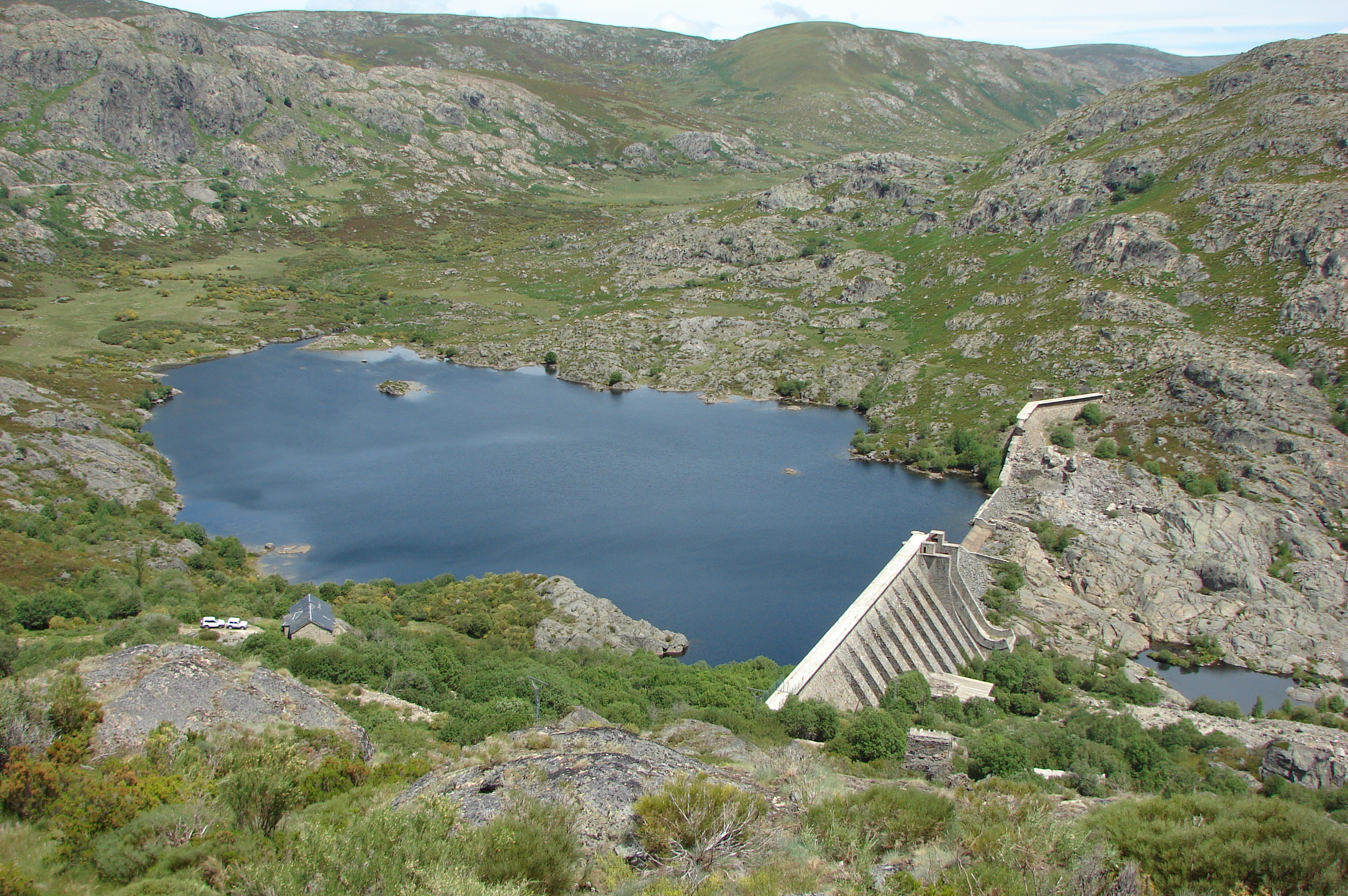
- Panoramic view of the Vega de Tera Reservoir in 2009. The ruptured retaining wall is visible.
- Date: 9 January 1959
- Location: Ribadelago, Province of Zamora, Francoist Spain; 42.178°N 6.779°W
- Cause: Dam failure
- Deaths: 144

The Vega de Tera disaster, (also known as the Ribadelago disaster was a flood that occurred on the early morning of 9 January 1959 in the Province of Zamora, in then Francoist Spain. The flood was caused by the failure of a dam, releasing water from the Vega de Tera reservoir. Of the 664 residents prior to the flood, 144 residents in Ribadelago were killed. The dam collapse in Ribadelago was the first of two fatal dam failures in Europe that year; in December of 1959 the Malpasset Dam also collapsed, causing over 400 more deaths.

== Background ==
The Tera River basin located within Sanabria Lake Natural Park, is a geological horst, uplifted by the Cabrera Valley Fault in the north and the Las Portillas Fault in the south. The horst is part of the Montes de León mountain range. The range consists of granite, gneiss and volcanic rock. The dam was constructed over the 139-kilometre (86 mi) Tera River.

Construction of the dam began in 1954 and ended in 1956, with the dam wall 33 metres (108 ft) high and spanning 380 metres (1,250 ft) across. It had a maximum capacity to hold 7,800,000 cubic metres (6,300 acre⋅ft) of water. It formed part of a larger system of artificial lakes and canals. The dam was managed by Hidroeléctrica Moncabril, a hydroelectric company.

== Flood ==
Before sunrise on 9 January 1959, a section of the dam's retaining wall measuring 169 by 97 by 33 metres (554 ft × 318 ft × 108 ft) collapsed. The collapse released 7.8 million cubic metres (280×10^{6} cu ft) of water from the Vega de Tera reservoir. At an initial peak discharge of 13,000 cubic metres per second (460,000 cu ft/s), the flood traveled 8 kilometres (5.0 mi) downstream towards Ribadelago.

The town, located eight kilometres (5.0 mi) downriver, was quickly inundated with water moving at a velocity of 108 kilometres per hour (67 mph). The time between hearing a loud roar as a result of the break and the subsequent torrent of water was insufficient for residents to escape. The surge carried along many tree trunks and debris. Many of the buildings were destroyed by the rapid flood, which had an estimated maximum flow depth of 34 metres (112 ft). The force of the flood dragged victims into Sanabria Lake. More than 1,500 domesticated animals also died. Recovery teams were only able to recover 28 bodies from the lake. Given the remote location of the town and time of incident, the first assistance did not arrive until the following morning. Sanabria Lake rose by 2.3 metres (7 ft 7 in) after floodwater and sediments entered. Only 10–20% of the total sediment volume was deposited into the lake; most of it was deposited along the floodway in the Tera River gorge. Damage was minor downstream as the force of the flood weakened when it entered the lake.

== Aftermath ==
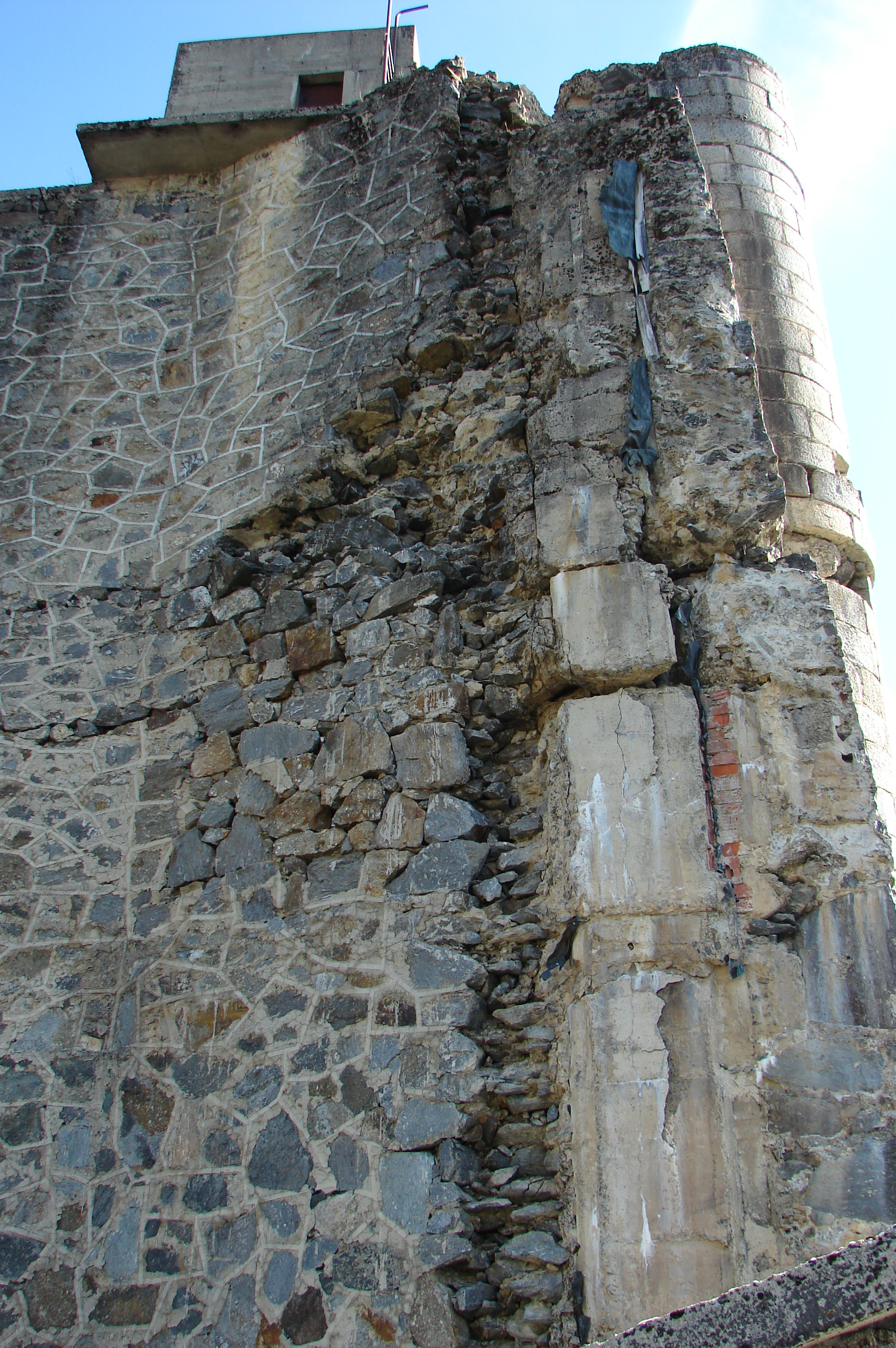
The retaining wall of the dam.

The disaster led to the creation of Instruction for the Project, Construction and Exploitation of Large Dams by the Ministry of Public Works in 1962. A modified version of the law was introduced in 1967. The Dam Surveillance Service was also formed for the purpose of ensuring dam safety and regulations. In December 1959, seven workers from Hidroeléctrica Moncabril, and three from the company that constructed the dam were indicted by the Court of Valladolid. Eventually, only five individuals were convicted for reckless negligence without circumstances.

A trial was held in March 1963 in Zamora concluded that Hidroeléctrica Moncabril was to pay 19,378,732 pesetas. In a report published during the trial, a failure in the design of the dam led to disaster. Experts concluded that poor construction material which could not withstand increased water pressure during increased rainfall prior to 9 January was the reason for catastrophe. According to an eyewitness present during the construction of the dam, leaks occurred, which had to be controlled by measuring water in the reservoir. The Hidroeléctrica Moncabril was eventually absorbed by Unión Fenosa. The court of justice sentenced the then managing director of the company, two engineers and an expert as directly responsible for the works to one year in prison for the crime of reckless negligence. Subsequently, the sentence was appealed and the convicted were finally acquitted or pardoned by the state.

Over a period of several days after the flood, donations amounted to 12 million pesetas. Families of the dead were compensated with varying amounts of money depending on ages of the victims. For each deceased adult, €600 equivalent was the compensation. €450 for victims over the age of 16, and €300 for children below 10 years. Those who were injured received €18 equivalent. Many survivors migrated to Zamora and Benavente. The Instituto Nacional de Colonización received €7,500 equivalent in compensation as well.

== See also ==
- List of dam failures
