= Entrepeñas =

Entrepeñas may refer to:

- Entrepeñas, Spain
- Entrepeñas Reservoir, Spain
