= Sanabria Lake Natural Park =

- IUCN category V (protected landscape/seascape)
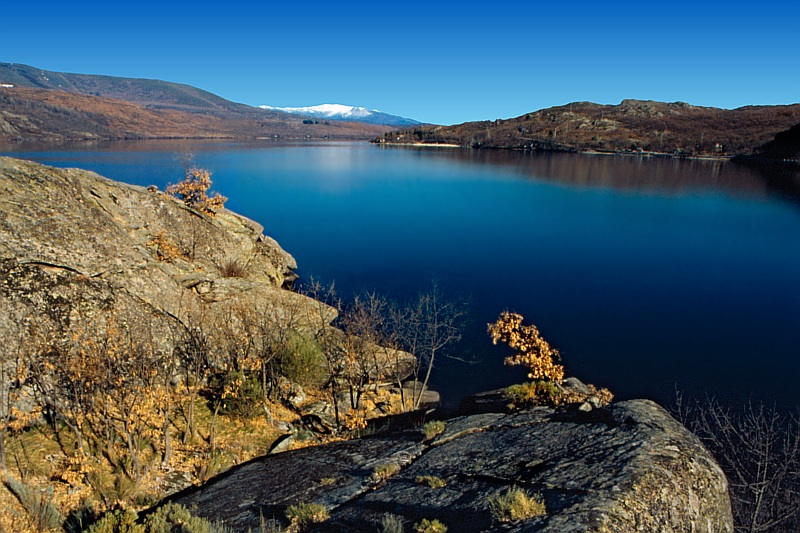

- Locator map of Sanabria Lake Natural Park (red) within the other parks in Castile and León
- Location: Zamora Province, Castile and León, Spain
- Nearest city: Puebla de Sanabria
- Coordinates: 42°07′21″N 6°43′09″W
- Area: 22,365 ha
- Established: October 27, 1978
- Visitors: 42,669 (in 2007)
- Governing body: Junta de Castilla y León
- Website: Parque Natural Lago de Sanabria

The Sanabria Lake Natural Park (Spanish: Parque Natural del Lago de Sanabria) is a natural park in Spain located around Sanabria Lake in the Sanabria comarca, northwest part of the Zamora Province, in the mountainous area of Sierra Segundera and Sierra de la Cabrera. It occupies a surface area of 22,365 ha, with heights ranging from 997 m at the lake banks to the 2,124 m of the peak of Peña Trevinca. The park spans across the municipalities of Galende, Cobreros, Trefacio y Porto de Sanabria.

== Lake ==
With its 318.7 ha, the lake that gives the name to the park is the largest glacial lake of the Iberian Peninsula. Its maximum depth is 51 m. There are a number of little lakes scattered in the mountains and its canyons that show the action of the glacier activity of the Quaternary. Along with numerous streams and the luxuriant and varied vegetation in every level, the park possesses high aesthetic and landscape value.

== Flora and fauna ==
The great biodiversity is one of the main features of the ecosystem of the park. Woods of oak coexist with birch, alder, hazel, willow, ash, rowan, chestnut, holly and yews along with large extensions of scrubland (broom). In the highlands, broom is usually replaced by heath. Here, the abundance of little glacial lakes, snowfall, sources and streams allows the existence of peat bogs, a rarity in these latitudes.

The fauna is varied: roe deer (Capreolus capreolus), wolf (Canis lupus), partridge (Perdix perdix), golden eagle (Aquila chrysaetos), otter (Lutra lutra) and trout are some of the numerous species found in the park which are protected by law since 1978.

== Visits ==
The Park Interpretation Centre is located in the restored monastery of San Martín de Castañeda, a medieval building that belonged to Cistercian monks. The centre has a permanent exhibition that shows the natural, social and cultural aspects of the park using scale models, explanation panels and audiovisual presentations, etc., which present the geological history of the place, the human activities and the conservation strategies.

The centre offers a privileged view over the lake. In summer it is open to the general public every day. In winter, from Monday to Friday it is only available to organised groups, who may have a guide to show the park, opening to the general public on Saturdays and Sundays.

== Gallery ==
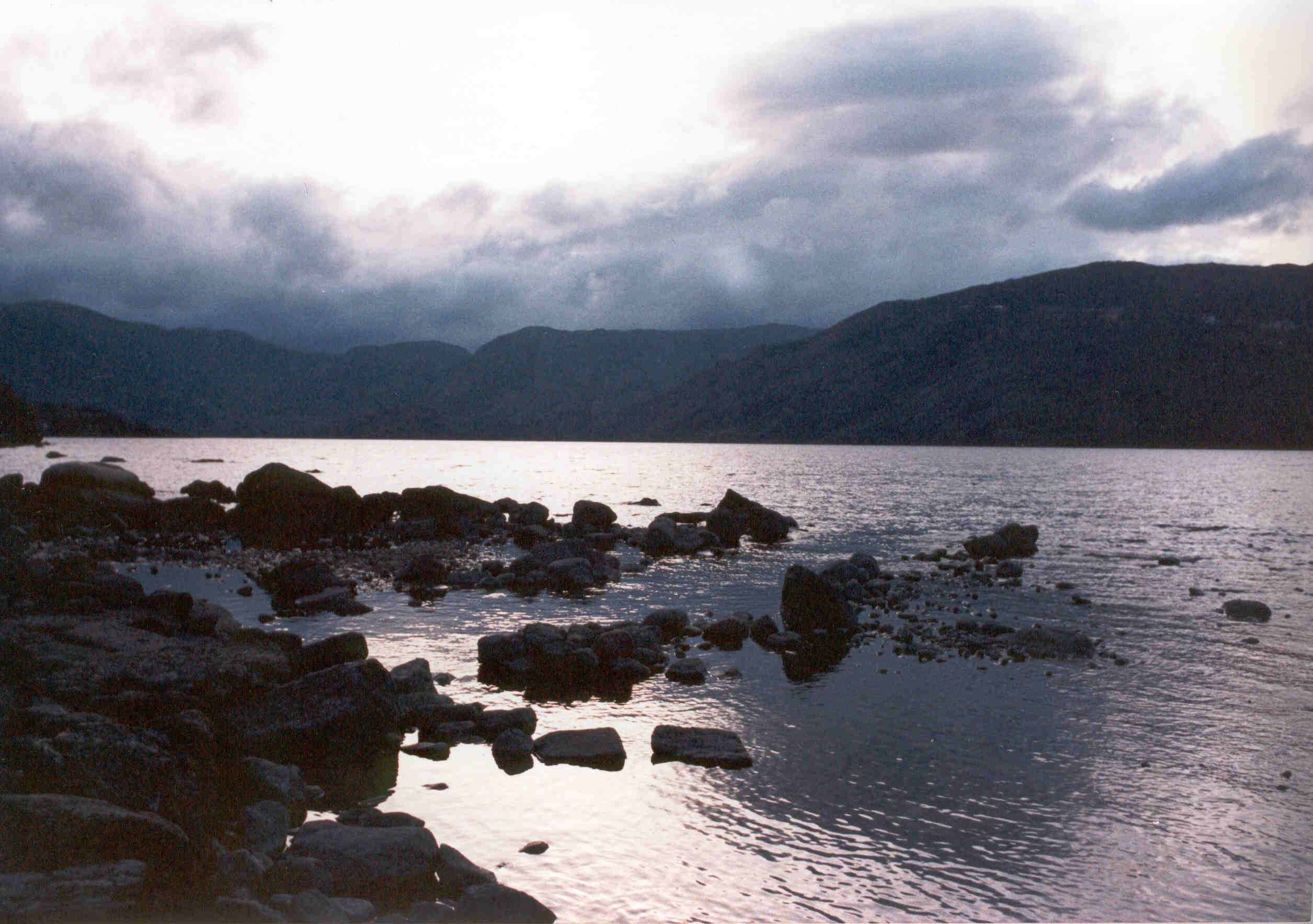
Sanabria lake

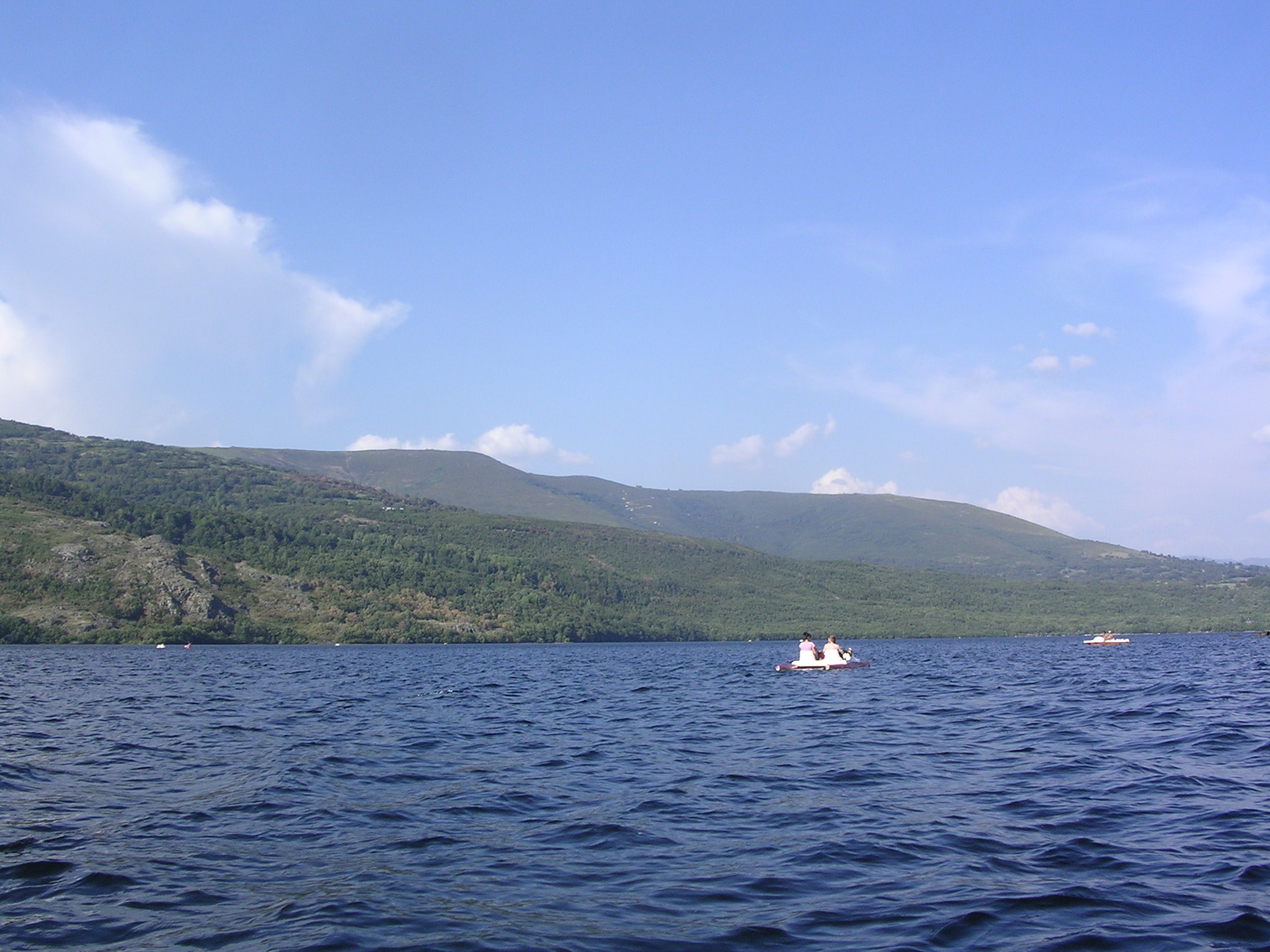
Sanabria lake

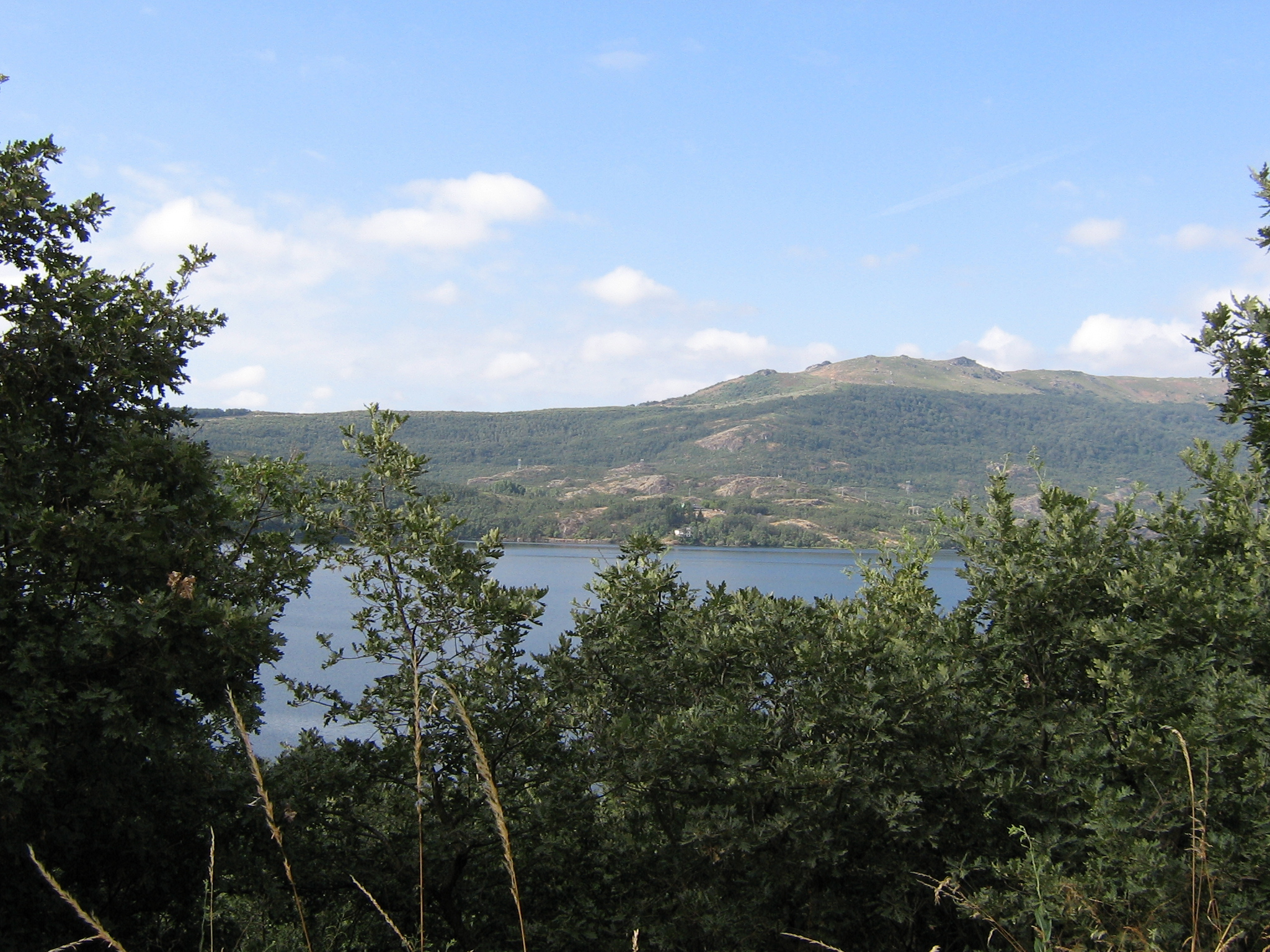
Sanabria Lake from San Martin

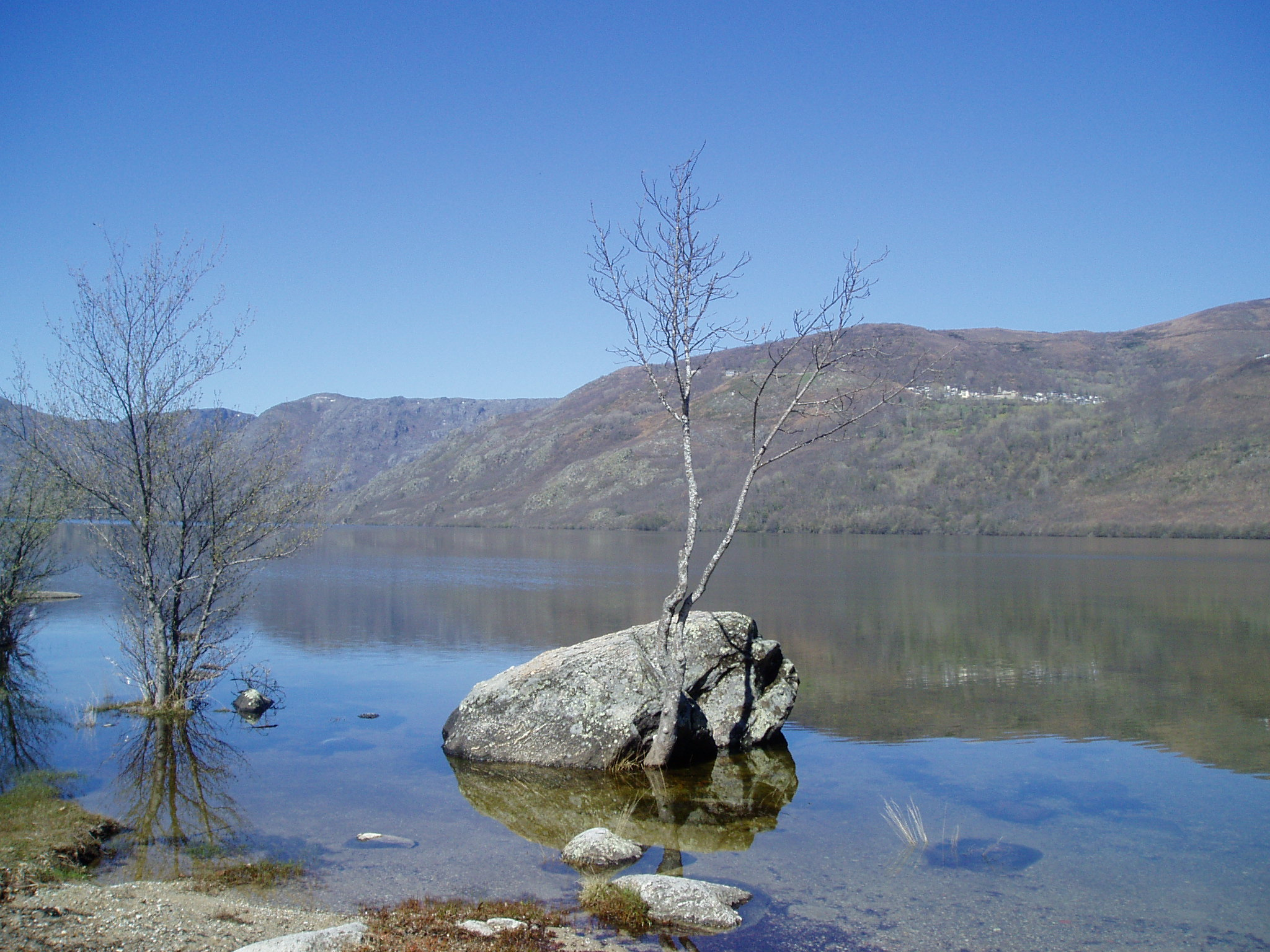
Sanabria lake from Playa de los Enanos

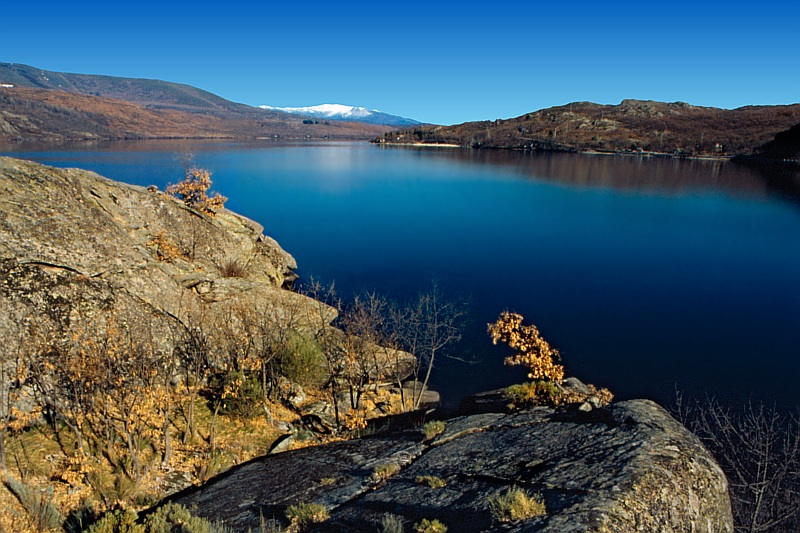

== See also ==
- Sanabria Lake
- Puebla de Sanabria
