= Sanabria Lake =

Lake in Zamora Province, Castile and León, Spain

Sanabria Lake Lago de Sanabria Llagu de Senabria
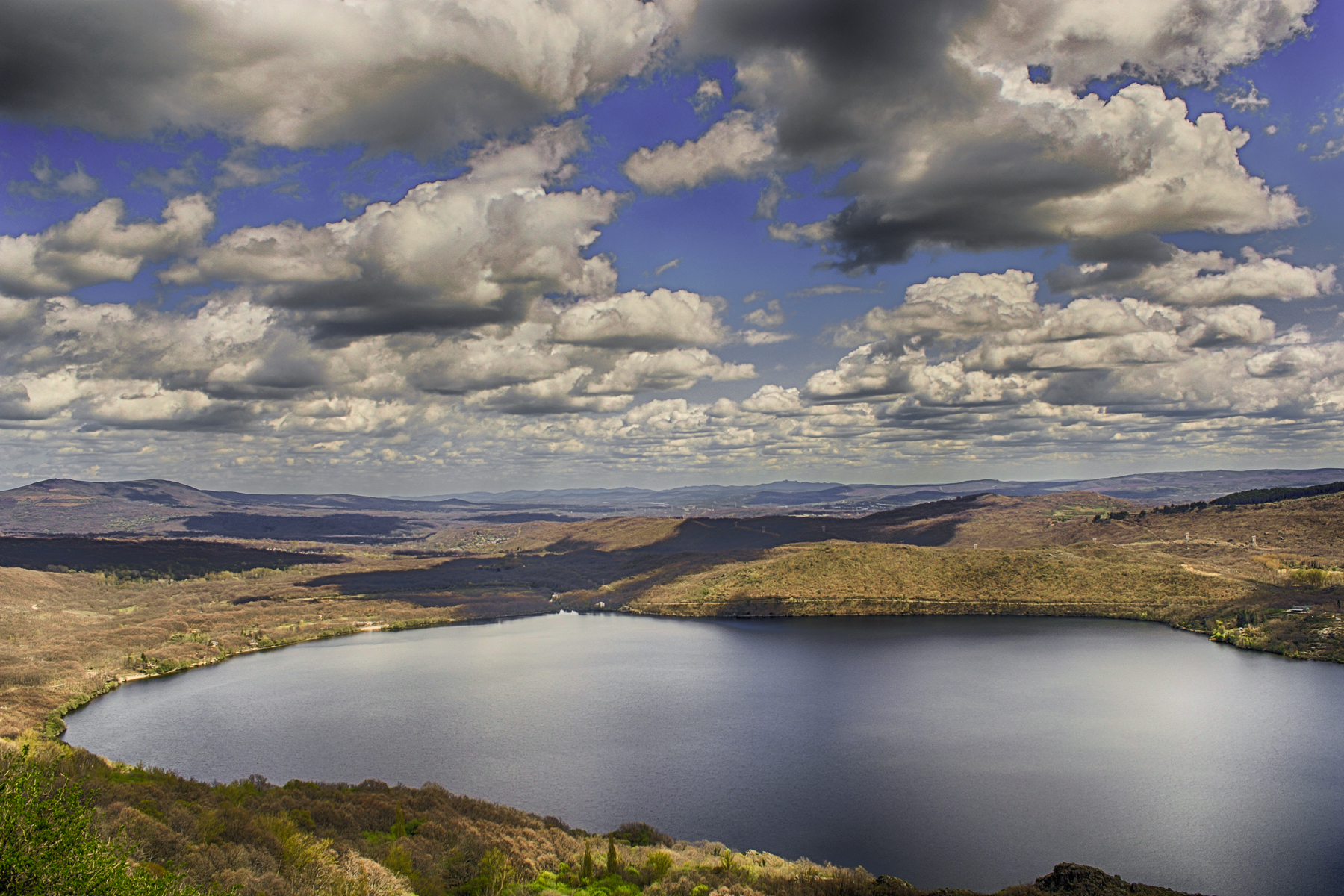

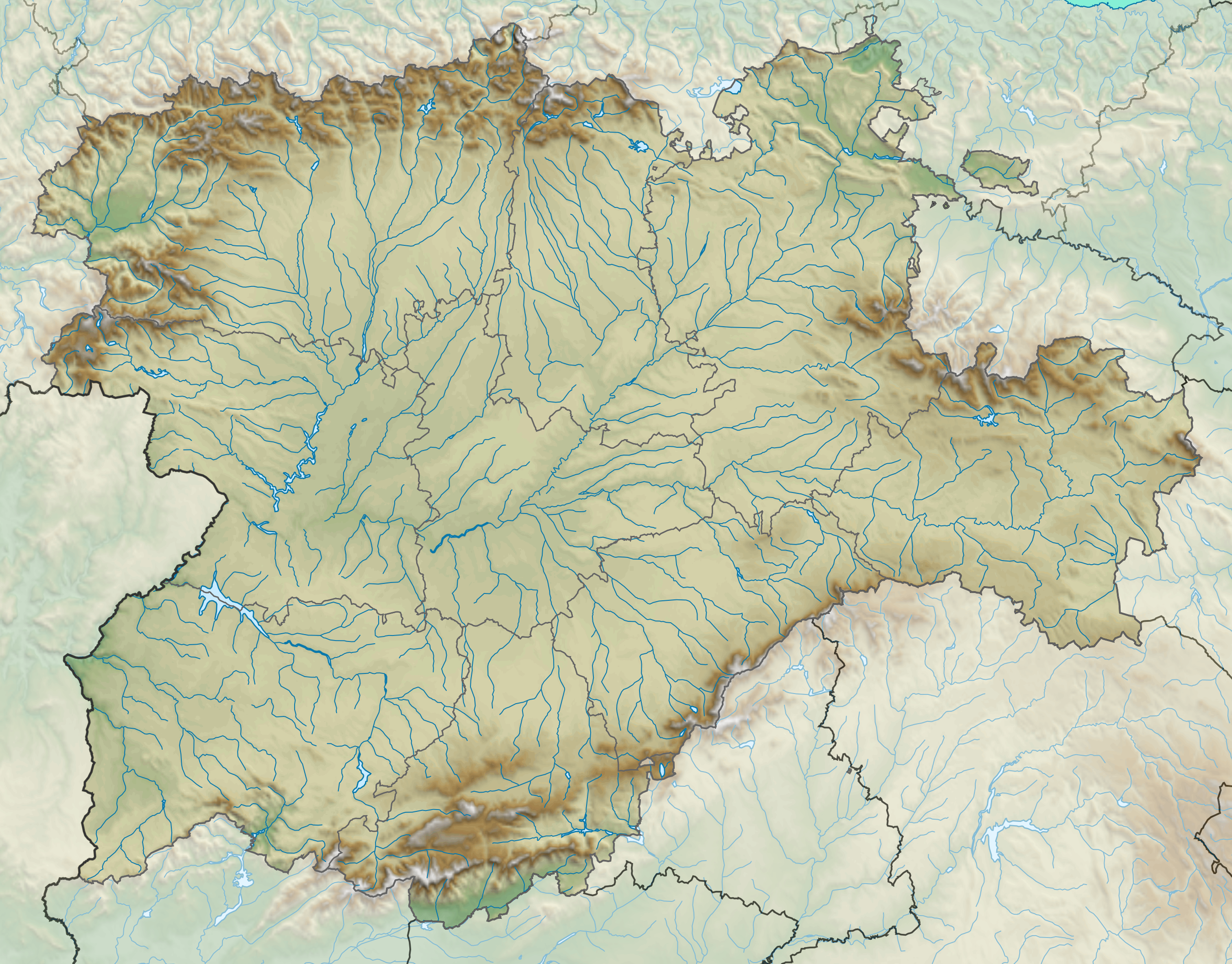
- Location within Castile and León
- Location: La Sanabria, Castile and León
- Coordinates: 42°07′21″N 6°43′09″W
- Primary inflows: Río Segundera, Río Cárdena
- Primary outflows: Río Trefacio
- Catchment area: 11.42 km^{2} (4.41 sq mi)
- Basin countries: Spain
- Max. length: 3.3 km (2.1 mi)
- Max. width: 1.47 km (0.91 mi)
- Surface area: 3.48 km^{2} (1.34 sq mi)
- Average depth: 27.7 m (91 ft)
- Max. depth: 51 m (167 ft)
- Water volume: 96,289,887 m^{3} (3.4004453×10^{9} cu ft)
- Shore length^{1}: 9.13 km (5.67 mi)
- Surface elevation: 1,018 m (3,340 ft)
- Islands: one
- Settlements: Puebla de Sanabria
- ^{1} Shore length is not a well-defined measure.

Sanabria Lake (Spanish: Lago de Sanabria, Spanish pronunciation: [ˈlaɣo ðe saˈnaβɾja]; Leonese: Llagu de Senabria; Galician: Lago de Seabra) is a lake located 8 km to the northwest of Puebla de Sanabria in the province of Zamora, Spain. It is one of the very few sizable natural lakes in Spain.

With a surface of 368 hectares it is also the largest glacial lake in the Iberian Peninsula.

The main inflow and outflow of water from the lake is the river Tera. The lake is a widening of the Tera.

The Sanabria lake is now within the limits of the Sanabria Lake Natural Park. The area was declared a Natural Park in 1978.

The Sanabria comarca is one of the few areas in Western Europe having a sizeable population of wild wolves living in the Sierra de la Culebra mountain range.

The lake was the site of a tragedy when the Vega de Tera dam failed and triggered a deadly flood. Bodies of the 144 killed ended up in the lake, most not recovered.

== See also ==
- Sanabria Lake Natural Park
