= Zamora railway station =

Central railway station of Zamora, Spain

Zamora
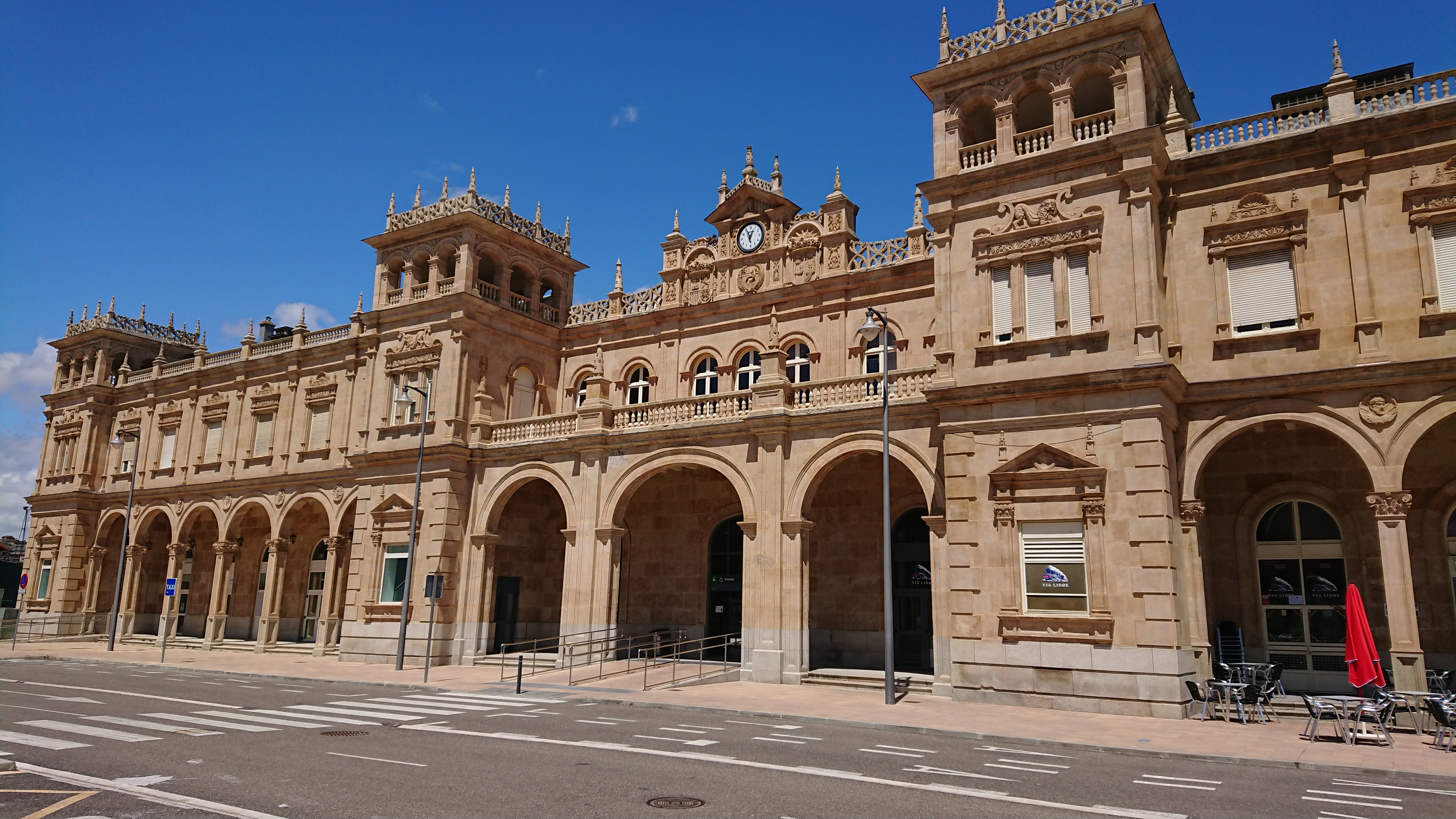

General information
- Location: Zamora; Spain
- Coordinates: 41°30′58″N 5°44′21″W
- Owner: Adif
- Lines: Madrid-Galicia high-speed rail line Medina del Campo-Zamora; Zamora-A Coruña

Passengers
- 2018: 193,549
Location

Zamora Railway Station (IATA: ZOB) is the central railway station of Zamora, Spain. Commonly referred locally as the Renfe station, the station is part of Adif and high-speed rail systems: it is located on one of the North-Northwestern high speed lines.

Preceding station	Renfe Operadora	Following station
Madrid Chamartín Terminus	AVE	Ourense-Empalme Terminus
Madrid Chamartín towards Alicante	AVE	Ourense-Empalme Terminus
Medina del Campo AV towards Madrid Chamartín	Alvia	Sanabria AV towards Ferrol
Medina del Campo AV towards Madrid Chamartín	Alvia	Sanabria AV towards Lugo
Medina del Campo AV towards Madrid Chamartín	Alvia	Sanabria AV towards Pontevedra
Medina del Campo AV towards Madrid Chamartín	Alvia	Sanabria AV towards Vigo-Urzáiz
Toro towards Valladolid-Campo Grande	Media Distancia 18	Carbajales de Alba towards Puebla de Sanabria
