= Calabor =

- Coordinates: 41°57′21.52″N 6°43′1.77″W
- Country: Spain
- Province: Zamora
- County: Sanabria
- Municipality: Pedralba de la Pradería
- Elevation: 766 m (2,513 ft)

Population (2012)
  - Total: 115

Calabor is a village belonging to Pedralba de la Pradería, to the south of the shire of Sanabria in the province of Zamora, Spain. It is located 2 km away from the Portuguese border. The villagers speak Spanish and Galician with some influences from Leonese and Portuguese.

== Economy ==
The economic engines of Calabor are agriculture, cattle breeding, a spa, a mineral water bottling factory, and a wind farm. Four decades ago, the village lived off the tin and sulfur mines that were within Calabor territory as well as the mineral water bottling factory and the old spa. At present, they are carrying out a new project that intend to give prosperity to this village, and it consists of a new spa for tourists and travelers who want to enjoy its mineral waters.

== The healing mineral waters of Calabor ==
The mineral water wells have been exploited since Roman times. The spa of Calabor was open until the mid-20th century. Some important celebrities like Eugenia de Montijo, the empress of the French, visited the spa.
