= Chanos, Spain =

- Location in Castile and León and Spain Chanos, Spain (Spain)
- Coordinates: 42°01′52″N 6°55′37″W
- Country: Spain
- Autonomous community: Castile and León
- Province: Zamora
- Elevation: 1,150 m (3,770 ft)

Population (2023)
  - Total: 43
- Time zone: UTC+1 (CET)
  - Summer (DST): UTC+2 (CEST)

Chanos is a municipality located in the province of Zamora, Castile and León, Spain. According to the 2023 Register (INE), the municipality has a population of 43 inhabitants.

In 1833 the municipality became part of Zamora. In around 1850, the old municipality of Chanos was integrated into Lubián.
