= Santa Cruz de Abranes =

Coordinates: 41°59′N 6°40′W

Santa Cruz de Abranes (Santa Cruz d'Abranes in the vernacular Leonese language) is a Spanish village in the municipality of Pedralba de la Pradería (Zamora, Castile and León) and is situated on the Spanish-Portuguese border.

The village belonged to Portugal until the eighteenth century, and it now belongs to the comarca of Senabria. The village is located within the protected natural space of Sierra de la Culebra.

== Language ==
Santa Cruz de Abranes (population approximately 30) is among the handful of places where the Leonese dialect remains active. In 1925, linguist Fritz Krüger declared the Leonese dialect of Santa Cruz de Abranes as "the prototpye of an antique Leones dialect, offering in its phonetics and morphological formations a summary of archaic formations such as one could hope to encounter in antique Leonese documents of the twelfth and thirteenth centuries".
