= Otero de Sanabria =

Coordinates: 42°02′58″N 6°34′24″W

Otero de Sanabria, Spain
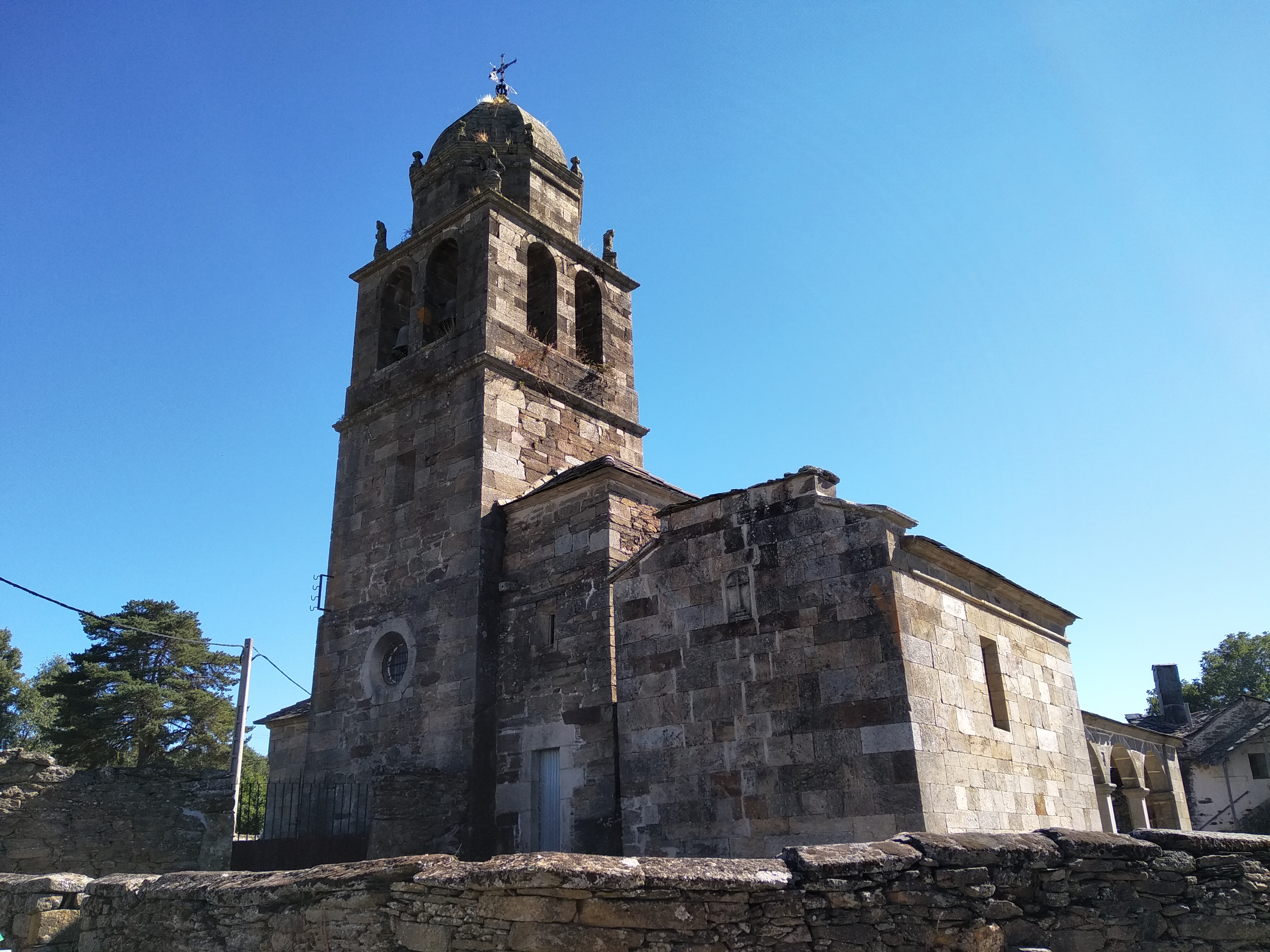
- Interactive map of Otero de Sanabria, Spain
- Country: Spain
- Autonomous community: Castile and León
- Province: Zamora
- Comarca: Sanabria
- Mancomunidad: Sanabria-Carballeda
- Town hall: Palacios de Sanabria
- Elevation: 950 m (3,120 ft)

Population (2020)
  - Total: 24
- Time zone: UTC+1 (CET)
  - Summer (DST): UTC+2 (CEST)

Otero de Sanabria is a village located in Sanabria, province of Zamora, Castile and León, Spain. According to the 2020 census (INE), the village had a population of 24 inhabitants.

Since 2021 it has been one of the few towns in Spain connected to its own high-speed railway station, through the Sanabria AV.

== Town hall ==
Palacios de Sanabria is home to the town hall of 4 villages:

- Palacios de Sanabria (124 inhabitants, INE 2020).
- Vime de Sanabria (65 inhabitants, INE 2020).
- Otero de Sanabria (24 inhabitants, INE 2020).
- Remesal de Sanabria (17 inhabitants, INE 2020).
