= Pedralba de la Pradería =

Coordinates: 42°02′N 6°42′W

- Municipality
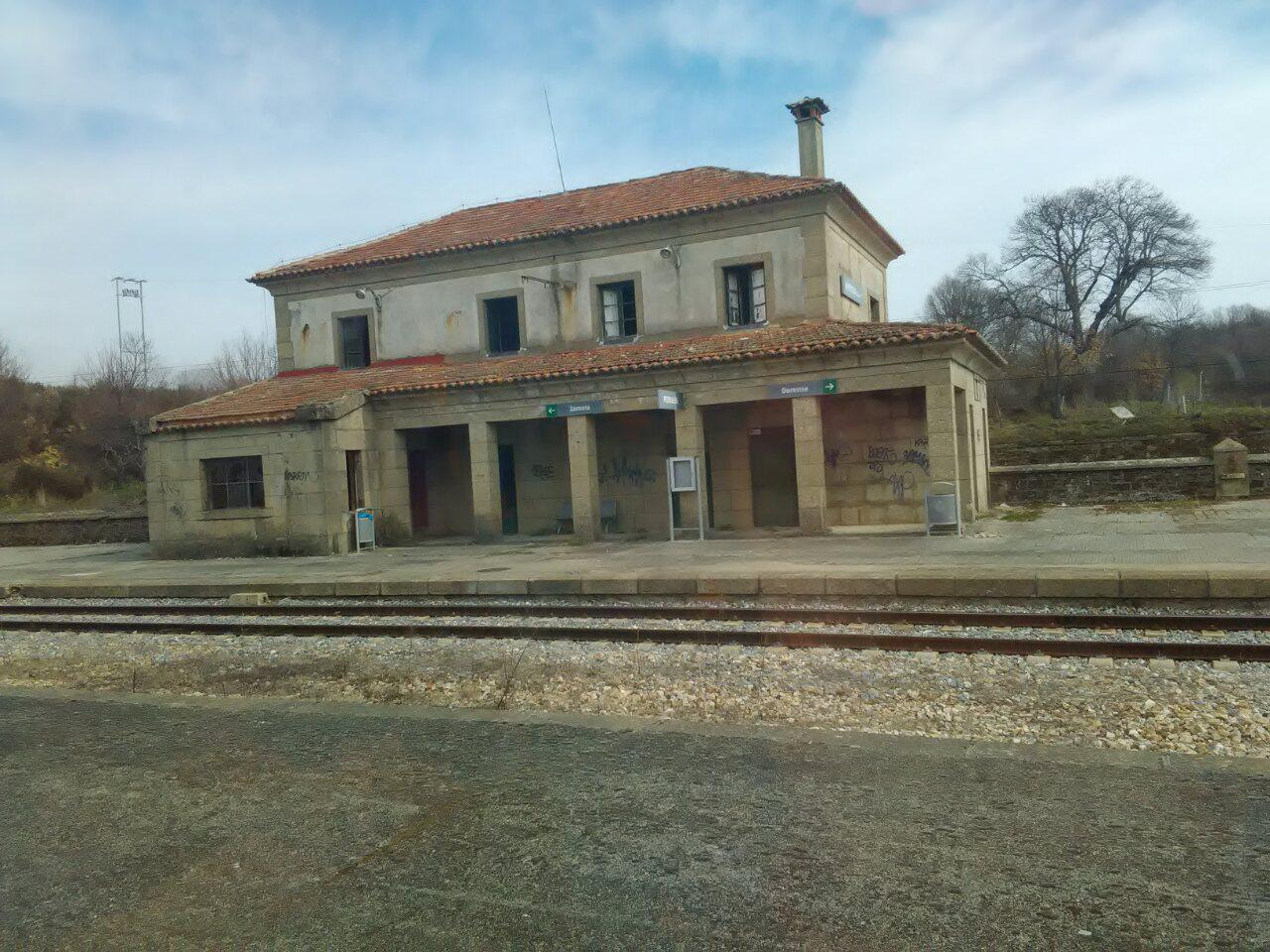

- Flag Coat of arms
- Interactive map of Pedralba de la Pradería
- Country: Spain
- Autonomous community: Castile and León
- Province: Zamora
- Municipality: Pedralba de la Pradería

Area
  - Total: 105 km^{2} (41 sq mi)

Population (2025-01-01)
  - Total: 198
  - Density: 1.89/km^{2} (4.88/sq mi)
- Time zone: UTC+1 (CET)
  - Summer (DST): UTC+2 (CEST)
- Website: Official website

Pedralba de la Pradería is a municipality located in the province of Zamora, Castile and León, Spain. According to the 2004 census (INE), the municipality has a population of 280 inhabitants.

== Description ==
Pedralba de la Pradería is located in the northwest of the Province of Zamora and belongs to the shire of Sanabria. Pedralba de la Praderia is rich in linguistic diversity, because three different Romance languages are spoken there: Spanish, Galician and Leonese. Spanish is spoken by all the inhabitants of the municipality, instead Galician is only spoken in the village of Calabor and Leonese in the rest of villages. Both Galician and Leonese are spoken in their Sanabrian local varieties, so both look very similar and share much vocabulary.

== Villages ==
The municipality of Pedralba de la Pradería is formed by the following villages:

- Pedralba de la Pradería
- Calabor
- Lobeznos
- Rihonor de Castilla
- Santa Cruz de Abranes
