= Ribadelago =

Coordinates: 42°08′N 6°45′W

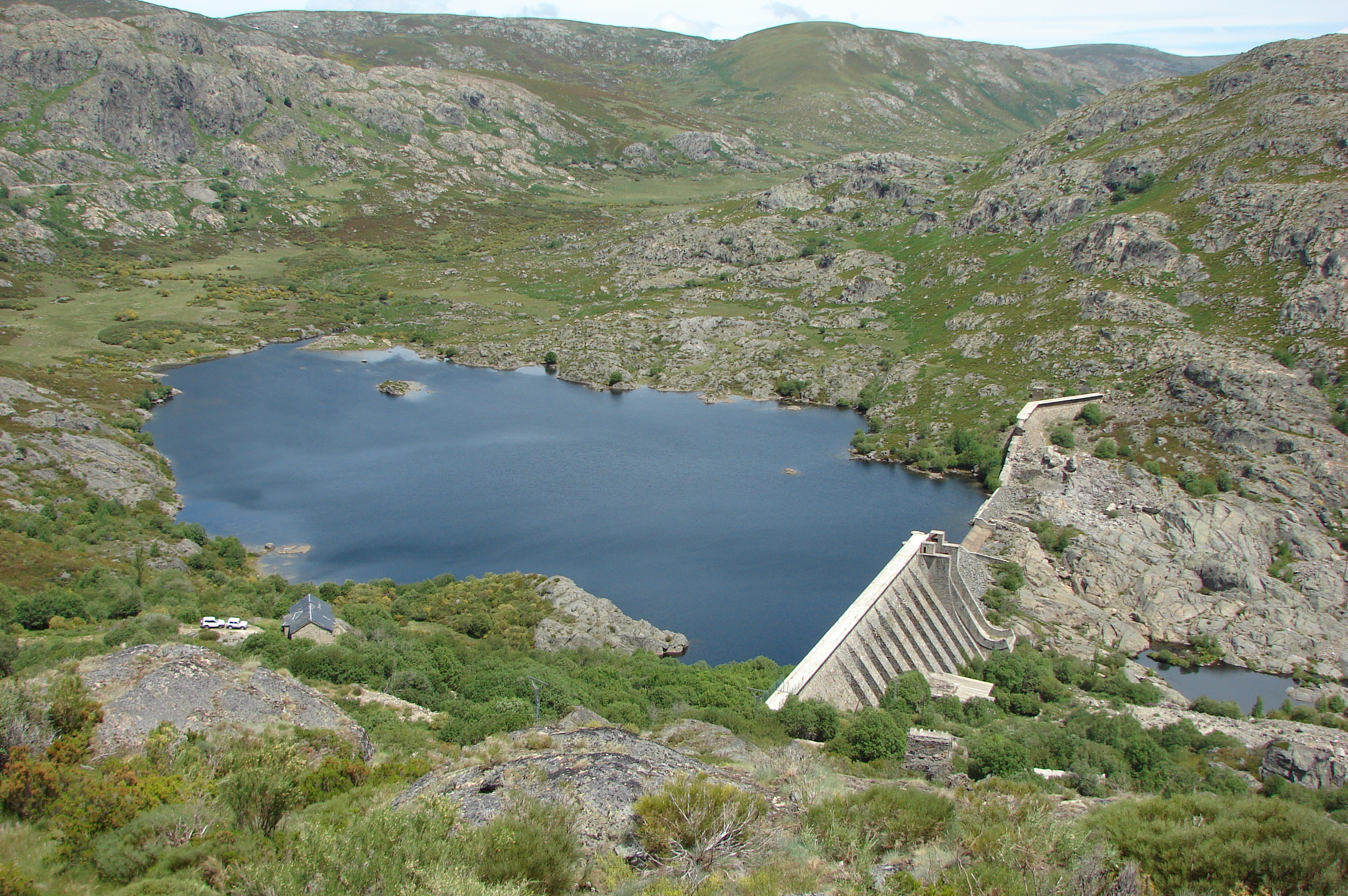
Vega de Tera reservoir destroyed

Ribadelago is a village located in province of Zamora, Spain. It is in the Galende municipality. It was partially destroyed in 1959 due to a dam failure in Vega de Tera reservoir, which caused 144 deaths.
