= José Mingorance =

Spanish footballer (1938–2026)

Personal information
- Full name: José Mingorance Chimeno
- Date of birth: 10 April 1938
- Place of birth: Castro de Sanabria, Spain
- Date of death: 5 January 2026 (aged 87)
- Height: 1.82 m (6 ft 0 in)
- Position: Central defender

Youth career
- Ferroviaria

Senior career*
Years	Team	Apps	(Gls)
1957–1959	Recreativo Granada		
1959–1962	Granada	53	(0)
1962–1965	Córdoba	86	(0)
1965–1970	Espanyol	97	(2)
1970–1971	Córdoba	32	(0)
1971–1973	Calella	52	(1)

International career
1963	Spain	1	(0)

Managerial career
- 1978–1980: Granada (assistant)
- 1980: Recreativo Granada
- 1980–1981: Loja
- 1981: Granada (assistant)
- 1981: Granada
- * Club domestic league appearances and goals

José Mingorance Chimeno (10 April 1938 – 5 January 2026) was a Spanish footballer, who played as a central defender. He died on 5 January 2026, at the age of 87.
