= Asturianos =

Place in Castile and León, Spain

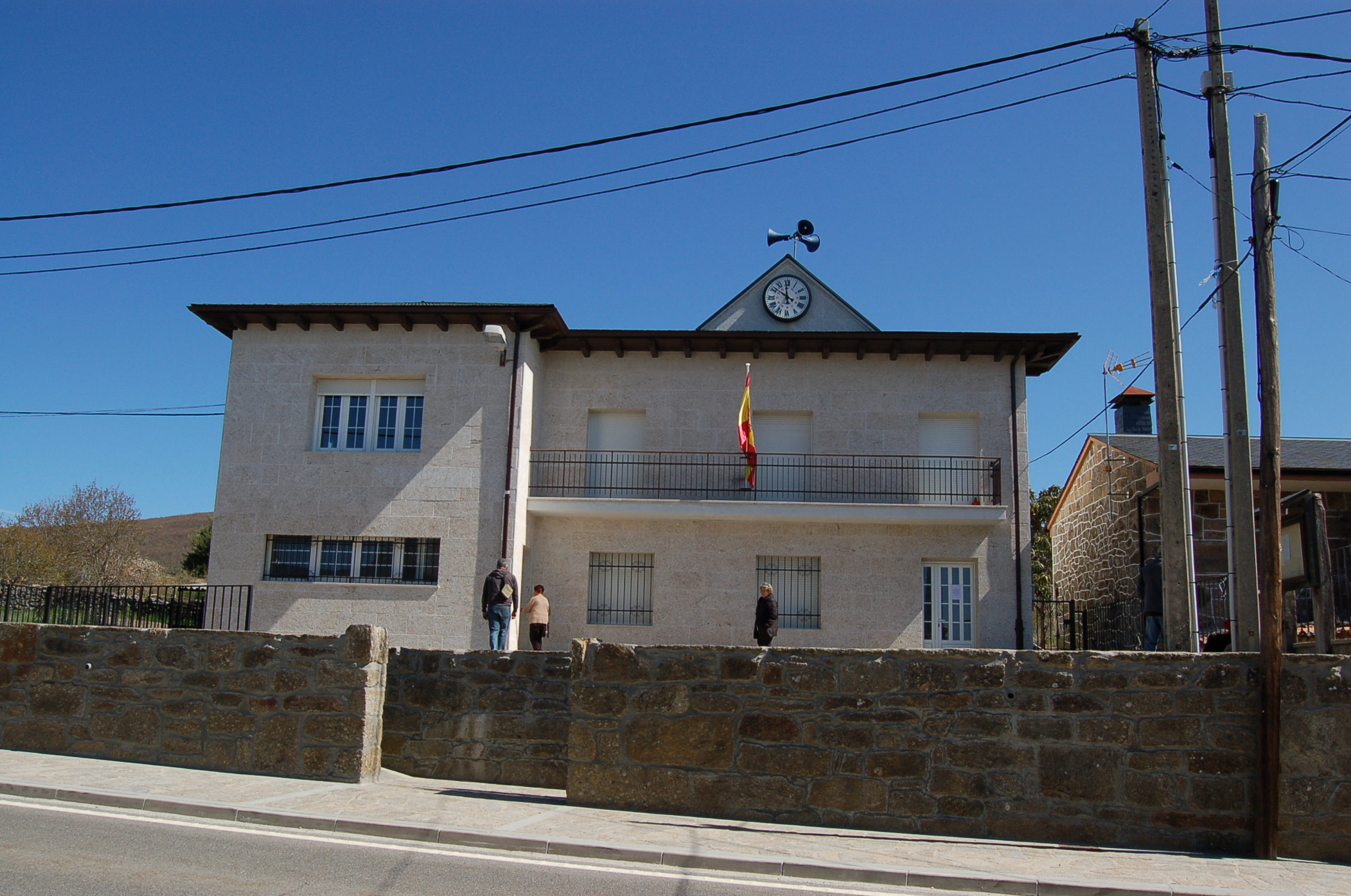
- City Hall

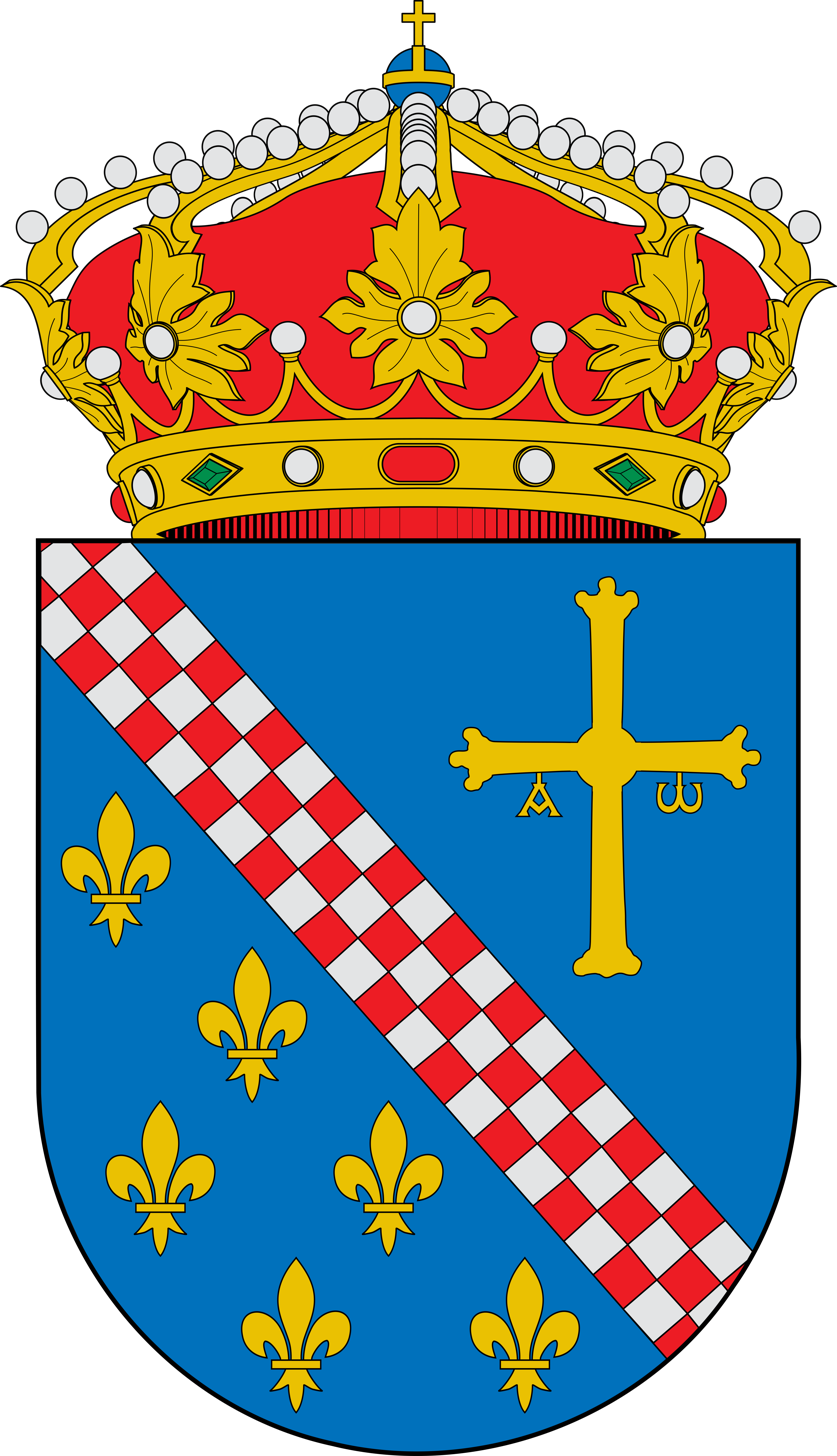
- Flag Coat of arms
- Interactive map of Asturianos
- Country: Spain
- Autonomous community: Castile and León
- Province: Zamora

Area
  - Total: 42.60 km^{2} (16.45 sq mi)
- Elevation: 968 m (3,176 ft)

Population (2025-01-01)
  - Total: 252
  - Density: 5.92/km^{2} (15.3/sq mi)
- Time zone: UTC+1 (CET)
  - Summer (DST): UTC+2 (CEST)

Asturianos (Leonese Esturianos) is a municipality located in the Sanabria comarca, province of Zamora, Castile and León, Spain.

== Background ==
According to the 2009 census (INE), the municipality had a population of 267 inhabitants. The Leonese language is still spoken here. It is on the Camino Sanabrés variant of the Via de la Plata pilgrim camino to Santiago de Compostela.

== Villages ==
- Asturianos, 42°03′05″N 6°29′18″W
- Cerezal de Sanabria
- Entrepeñas, 42°01′57″N 6°28′30″W
- Lagarejos de la Carballeda, 42°03′05″N 6°28′19″W
- Rioconejos, 42°04′25″N 6°28′17″W
- Villar de los Pisones, 42°04′00″N 6°30′00″W.
