= Porto de Sanabria =

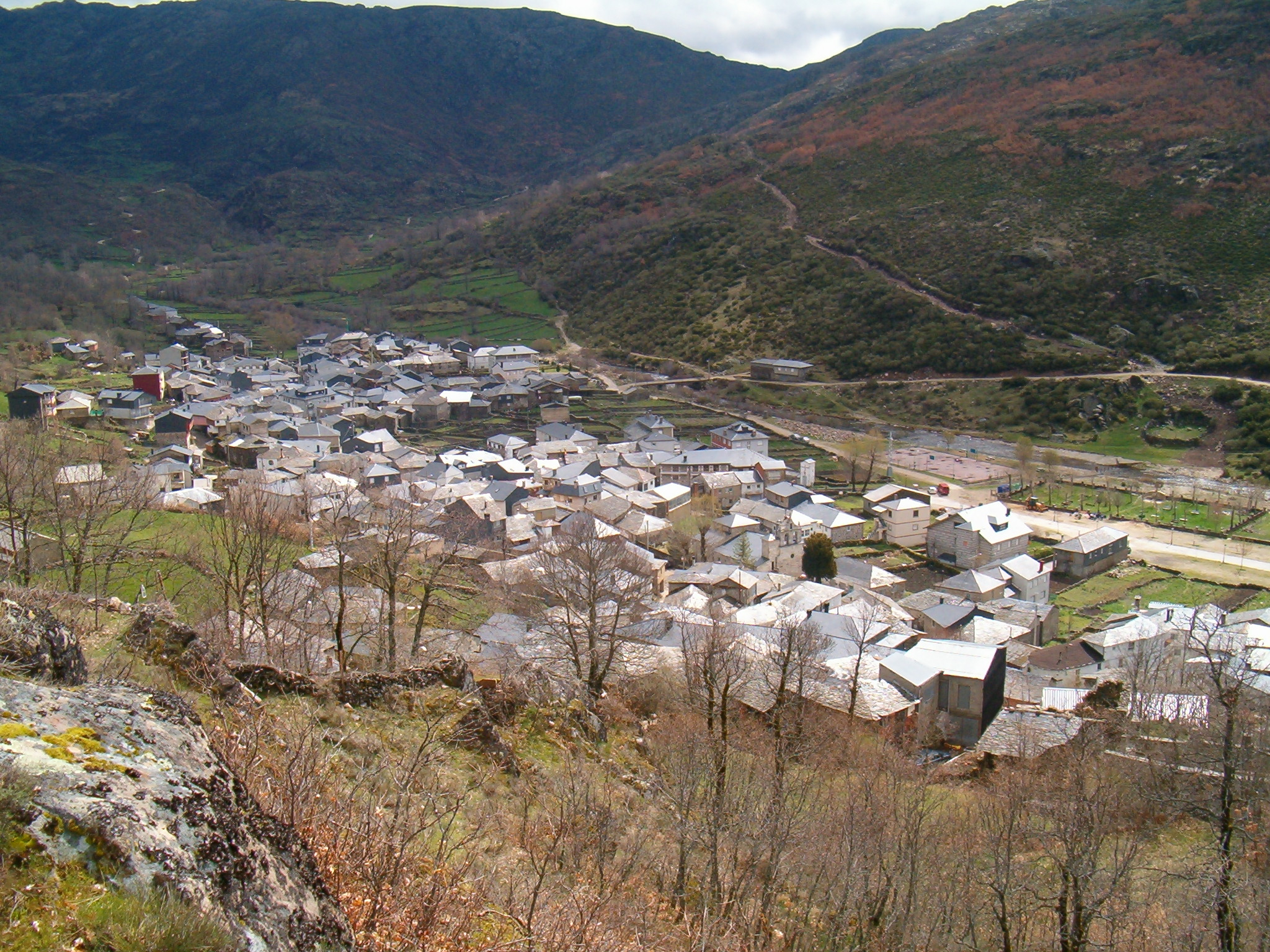

- Coat of arms

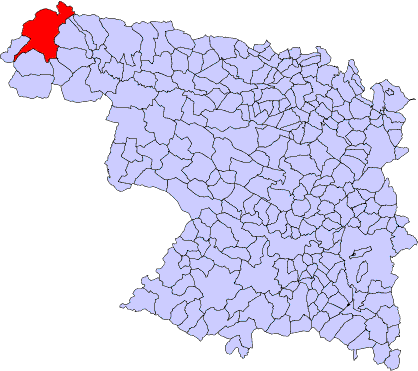
- Porto within the Province of Zamora

- Location in Spain
- Coordinates: 42°10′2″N 6°53′58″W
- Country: Spain
- Autonomous community: Castile and León
- Province: Zamora
- Comarca: Sanabria
- Judicial District: ?
- Mancomunidad: Alta Sanabria

Government
  - Mayor: Rogelio Carracedo Carracedo (PP)

Area
  - Total: 200.82 km^{2} (77.54 sq mi)
- Elevation: 1,211 m (3,973 ft)

Population (2025-01-01)
  - Total: 147
  - Density: 0.732/km^{2} (1.90/sq mi)
- Demonym: Portexos
- Time zone: UTC+1 (CET)
  - Summer (DST): UTC+2 (CEST)
- Postal code: 49583
- Area code: (+34) 980
- Website: Official website

Porto de Sanabria (Galician: Porto de Seabra; Leonese: Porto de Senabria), also known as Porto, is a municipality located in the province of Zamora, Castile and León, Spain. According to the 2012 census (INE), the municipality has a population of 216 inhabitants.

== Geography ==
Porto is located near the borders of Castile and León with Galicia, in the Sanabria Lake Natural Park, nearby the Galician Massif. It is 90 km far from Bragança, in Portugal, 113 from Ponferrada, and 171 from Zamora. Its municipal territory counts several lakes, reservoirs and rivers.

== Culture ==
Porto is one of the few bilingual places of its province, in which is commonly spoken both Spanish and Galician.

== See also ==
- List of municipalities in Zamora
