= Lobeznos =

Coordinates: 42°02′20″N 6°40′04″W

Lobeznos ("Wolf pups" in English) is a village belonging to the municipality of Pedralba de la Pradería, in the province of Zamora, Spain.

The village is 3.5 km away from Puebla de Sanabria and is located on the highway linking this town to Bragança in Portugal. The name of the village means wolf cubs, because many wolves lived in this area in the past.

== Monuments ==
- The chapel of Holy Christ (Ermita del Santo Cristo in Spanish): It is a small recently restored chapel that has a statue of the Holy Christ of the Ascension (very venerated by the locals). The pregnant women of the village commend themselves to this Christ to seek protection by praying nine Creeds around the chapel.
- The Church of Saint Eulalia (Iglesia de Santa Eulalia in Spanish) is situated in the quarter of la Preira and is surrounded by the local cemetery.
