= Lubián =

Coordinates: 42°02′N 6°54′W

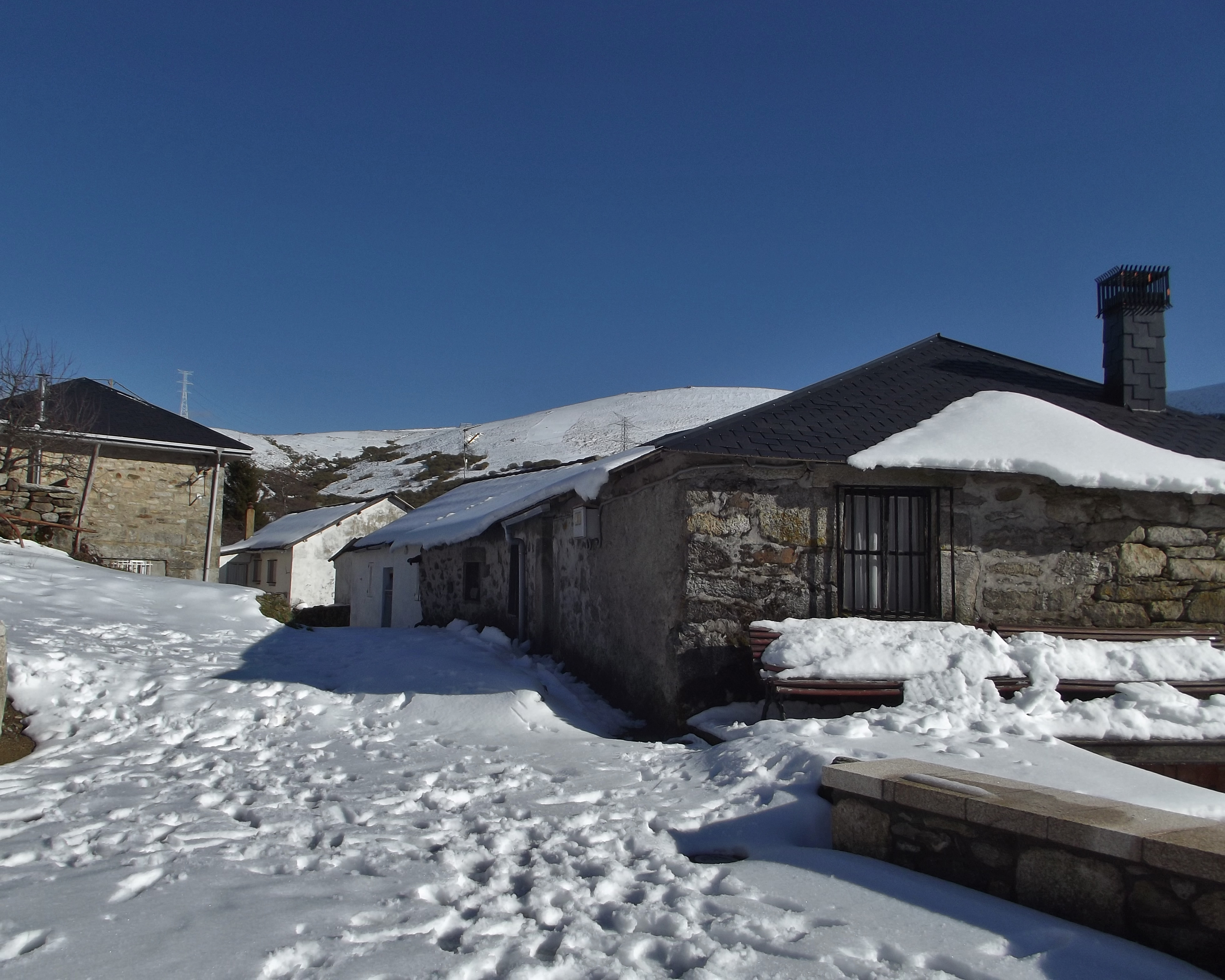
- Padornelo
- Interactive map of Lubián
- Country: Spain
- Autonomous community: Castile and León
- Province: Zamora
- Municipality: Lubián

Government
  - Mayor (Alcalde): Felipe Lubián Lubián (PSOE)

Area
  - Total: 94 km^{2} (36 sq mi)
- Elevation: 1,030 m (3,380 ft)

Population (2025-01-01)
  - Total: 296
  - Density: 3.1/km^{2} (8.2/sq mi)
- Time zone: UTC+1 (CET)
  - Summer (DST): UTC+2 (CEST)
- Website: Ayuntamiento de Lubián

Lubián is a municipality located in the province of Zamora, Castile and León, Spain. According to the 2018 census (INE), the municipality has a population of 302 inhabitants. It is one of the few bilingual municipalities in the province con Zamora. Its inhabitants habitually use Spanish as well as Galician.

== Geography ==
The village is located to the northwest of the province of Zamora, next to the Galician province of Ourense, bordering the region of Viana, and close to the border with Portugal, at the same height as the historic region of Trás-os-Montes. It belongs to the so-called Alta Sanabria, a sub-region of the historical and traditional region of Sanabria. The towns of Aciberos, Chanos, Las Hedradas, Hedroso, Lubián and Padornelo are located within its municipal district.

Its geographical location, adjacent to Galicia and close to Portugal, has made it one of the few bilingual municipalities in the province of Zamora, as its inhabitants regularly use Spanish and Galician.

Its town center is crossed by the old N-525 road, now called ZA-106. There is also a new bypass of the N-525 and the A-52 or Rías Bajas highway. It has a conventional railway station, the Lubián station. At present the future High Speed Railway Line between Madrid and Galicia is being built, which will pass through the municipality, although in principle the construction of any station or stop is not foreseen.

=== The Mozarabe-Sanabrés Way ===
Lubián is the last municipality of the Camino Sanabrés as it passes through the province of Zamora. In this town the pilgrim finds the first of more than a hundred "stones", all different, made by the sculptor Carballo from Ourense and arranged along the route by the province of Ourense.

== History ==
In the Middle Ages, with the advance of the Reconquista, Lubián was integrated into the Kingdom of León, where it later remained, a fact which, during the Modern Age, the documentation explicitly mentions Lubián's belonging to the Adelantamiento of the Kingdom of León.

There is a theory, based on the local oral tradition, that Lubián may have belonged to the Order of the Temple during medieval times, although the lack of documents does not allow any conclusive affirmation to be made in this regard.

Already in the Contemporary Age, when the current provinces were created in 1833, Lubián was integrated into the province of Zamora, within which it is part of the Leonese Region.
