= Bretocino =

Place in Castile and León, Spain

Coordinates: 41°53′N 5°45′W

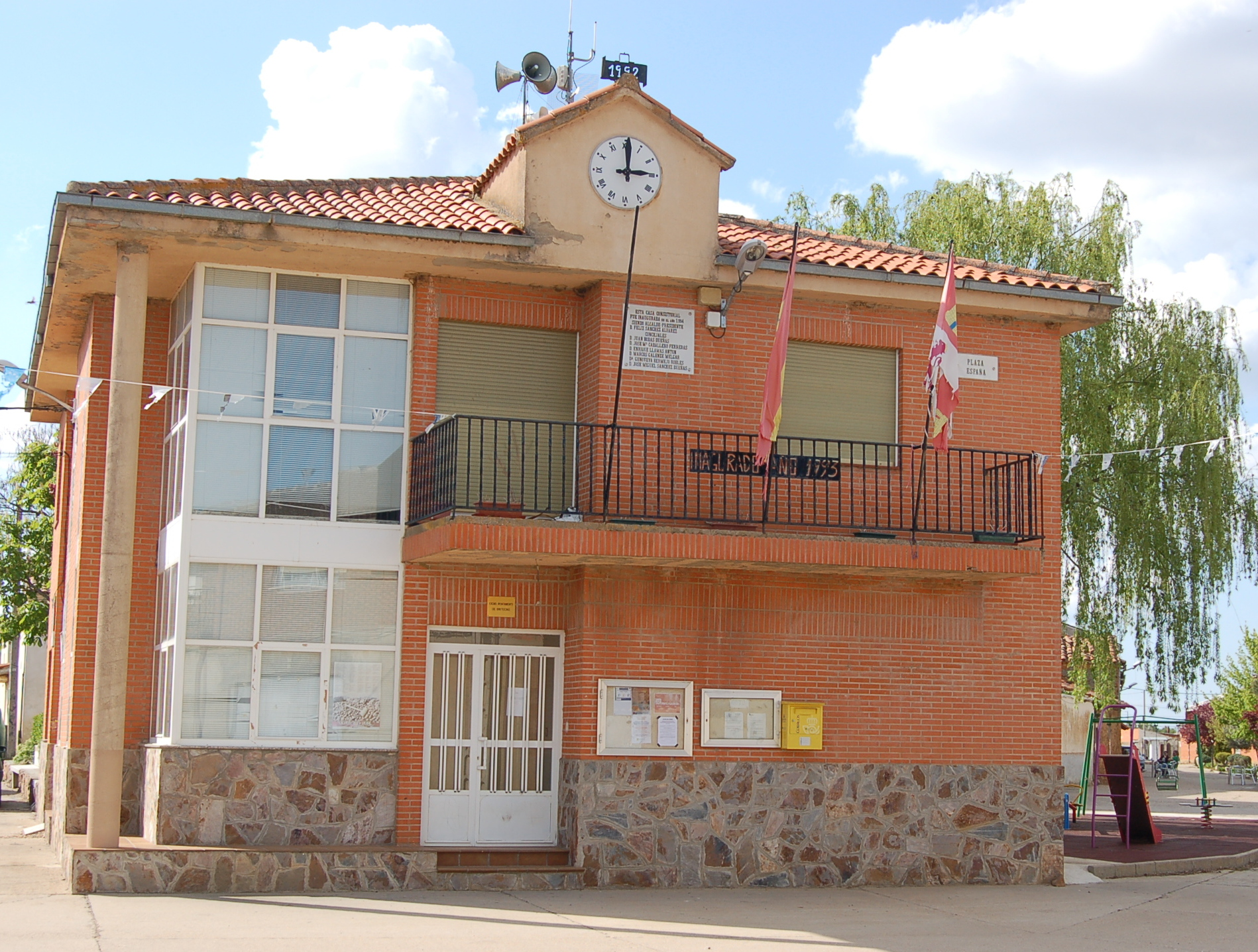
- Interactive map of Bretocino
- Country: Spain
- Autonomous community: Castile and León
- Province: Zamora
- Municipality: Bretocino

Area
  - Total: 12 km^{2} (4.6 sq mi)

Population (2025-01-01)
  - Total: 192
  - Density: 16/km^{2} (41/sq mi)
- Time zone: UTC+1 (CET)
  - Summer (DST): UTC+2 (CEST)

Bretocino is a municipality located in the province of Zamora, Castile and León, Spain. According to the 2009 census (INE), the municipality has a population of 259 inhabitants.
