= Sampil =

Sampil is a surname. Notable people with this surname include:

- Abdoulaye Sekou Sampil (born 1984), French-Senegalese footballer
- Aniceto Sela Sampil (1863–1935), Spanish jurist
- Peter Sampil (born 1974), French footballer
