= Tera River =

River in northern Spain

Tera
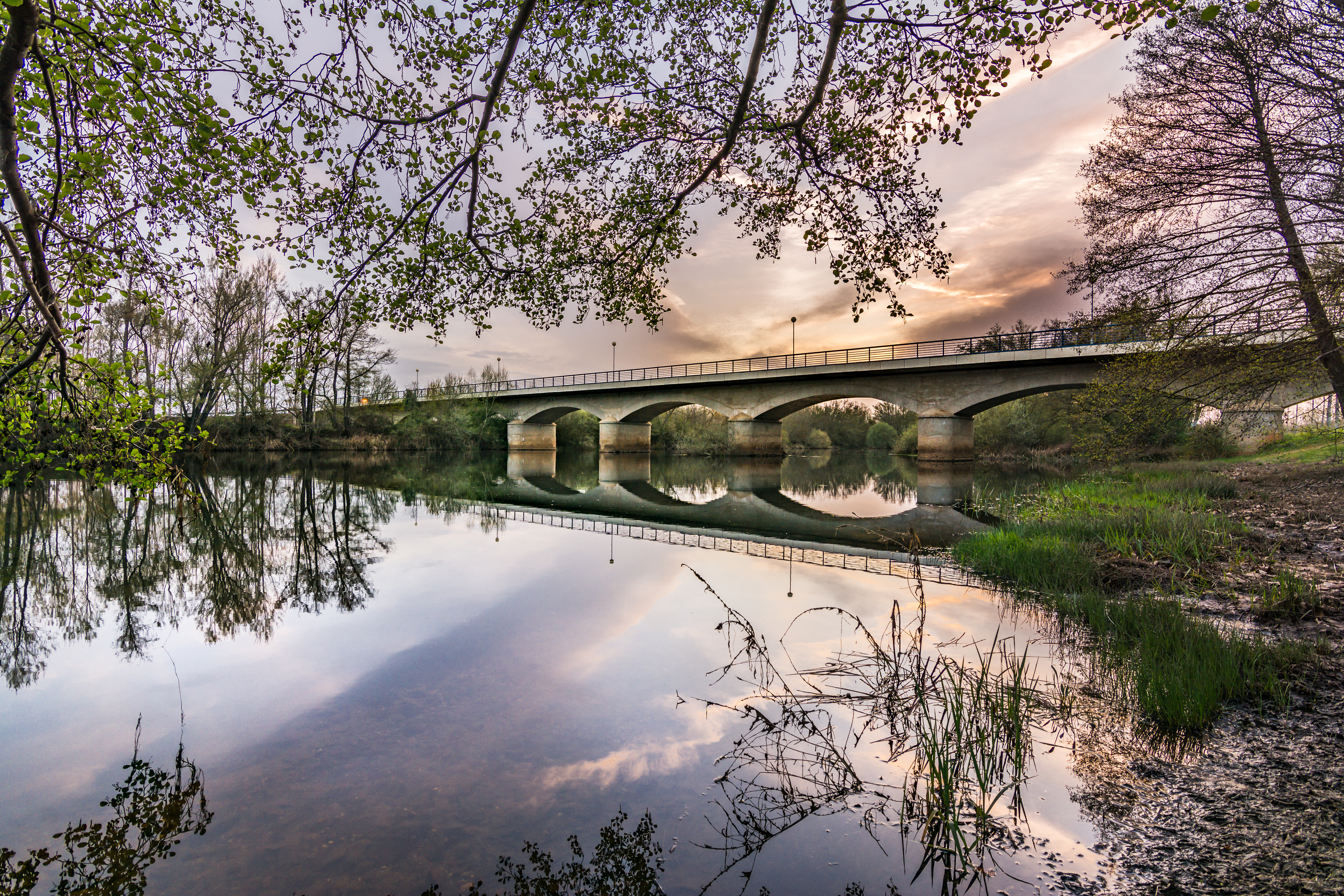
- Bridge over Tera River in Micereces de Tera

Location
- Country: Spain
- Region: Castile and Leon

Physical characteristics
- Mouth
  - location: River Esla, Bretocino
  - coordinates: 41°53′57″N 5°44′22″W
- Length: 139.82 km (86.88 mi)
- Basin size: 2,412 km^{2} (931 sq mi)

The Tera is a river in the north of Spain, a tributary of the River Esla.

It is of ecological importance, being the home of 24 species of the European Union Nature Directives. Riberas del Río Tera y afluentes was designated a Special Area of Conservation in 2015.
