= Rosinos de la Requejada =

Rosinos de la Requejada, Spain
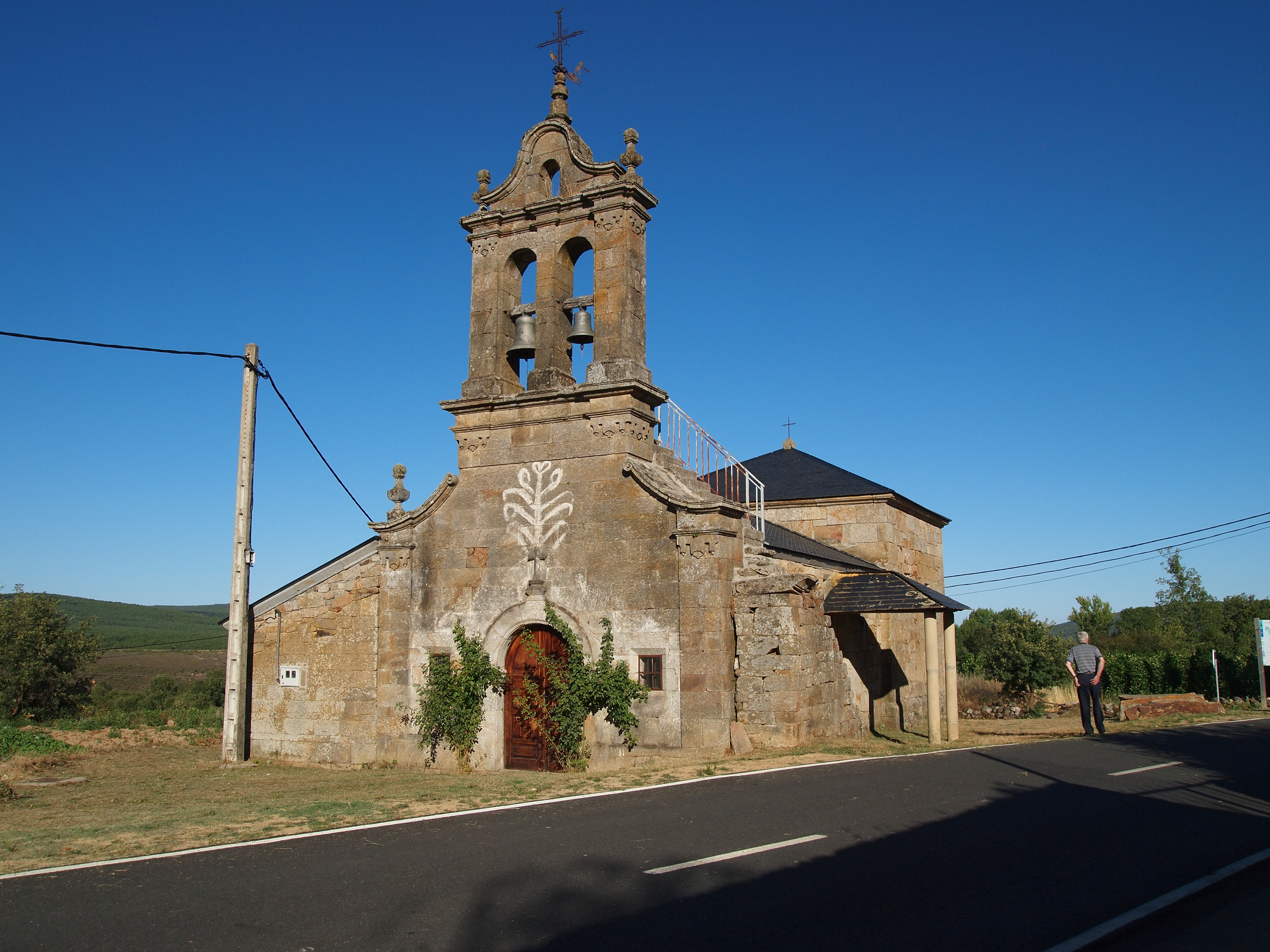

- Flag Coat of arms

- Location of Rosinos de la Requejada within Spain
- Coordinates: 42°05′N 6°32′W
- Country: Spain
- Autonomous community: Castile and León
- Province: Zamora
- Municipality: Rosinos de la Requejada

Area
  - Total: 154 km^{2} (59 sq mi)

Population (2025-01-01)
  - Total: 292
  - Density: 1.90/km^{2} (4.91/sq mi)
- Time zone: UTC+1 (CET)
  - Summer (DST): UTC+2 (CEST)
- Postal code: 49322

Rosinos de la Requejada is a municipality located in the province of Zamora, Castile and León, Spain. According to the 2004 census (INE), the municipality has a population of 492 inhabitants.
