= Rioconejos =

- Location in Spain
- Coordinates: 42°04′28″N 6°27′40″W
- Country: Spain
- Autonomous community: Castile and León
- Province: Zamora
- Municipality: Asturianos

Population (2014)
  - Total: 23
- Time zone: UTC+1 (CET)
  - Summer (DST): UTC+2 (CEST)

Rioconejos is a locality in the municipality of Asturianos, province of Zamora, Castile and León, Spain. According to the 2014 census (INE), the locality has a population of 23 inhabitants.

== See also ==
- List of municipalities in Zamora
