= Cobreros =

Coordinates: 42°04′N 6°42′W

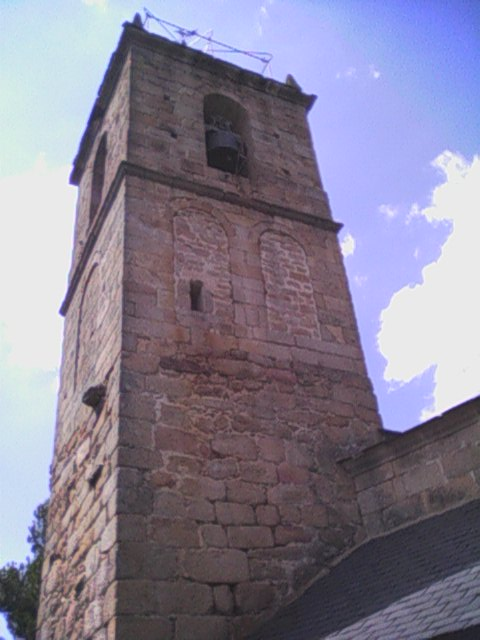
- Interactive map of Cobreros
- Country: Spain
- Autonomous community: Castile and León
- Province: Zamora
- Municipality: Cobreros

Area
  - Total: 77 km^{2} (30 sq mi)

Population (2025-01-01)
  - Total: 543
  - Density: 7.1/km^{2} (18/sq mi)
- Time zone: UTC+1 (CET)
  - Summer (DST): UTC+2 (CEST)

Cobreros is a municipality located in the province of Zamora, Castile and León, Spain. According to the 2009 census (INE), the municipality has a population of 613 inhabitants.

== Notable locals ==
- José Mingorance, Spanish international footballer.
