= Cerezal de Sanabria =

- Location in Spain
- Coordinates: 42°03′55″N 6°26′42″W
- Country: Spain
- Autonomous community: Castile and León
- Province: Zamora
- Municipality: Asturianos

Population (2014)
  - Total: 13
- Time zone: UTC+1 (CET)
  - Summer (DST): UTC+2 (CEST)

Cerezal de Sanabria is a locality in the municipality of Asturianos, province of Zamora, Castile and León, Spain. According to the 2014 census (INE), the locality has a population of 13 inhabitants.

== See also ==
- List of municipalities in Zamora
