= Palacios de Sanabria =

Place in Castile and León, Spain

Coordinates: 42°03′N 6°31′W

Palacios de Sanabria, Spain
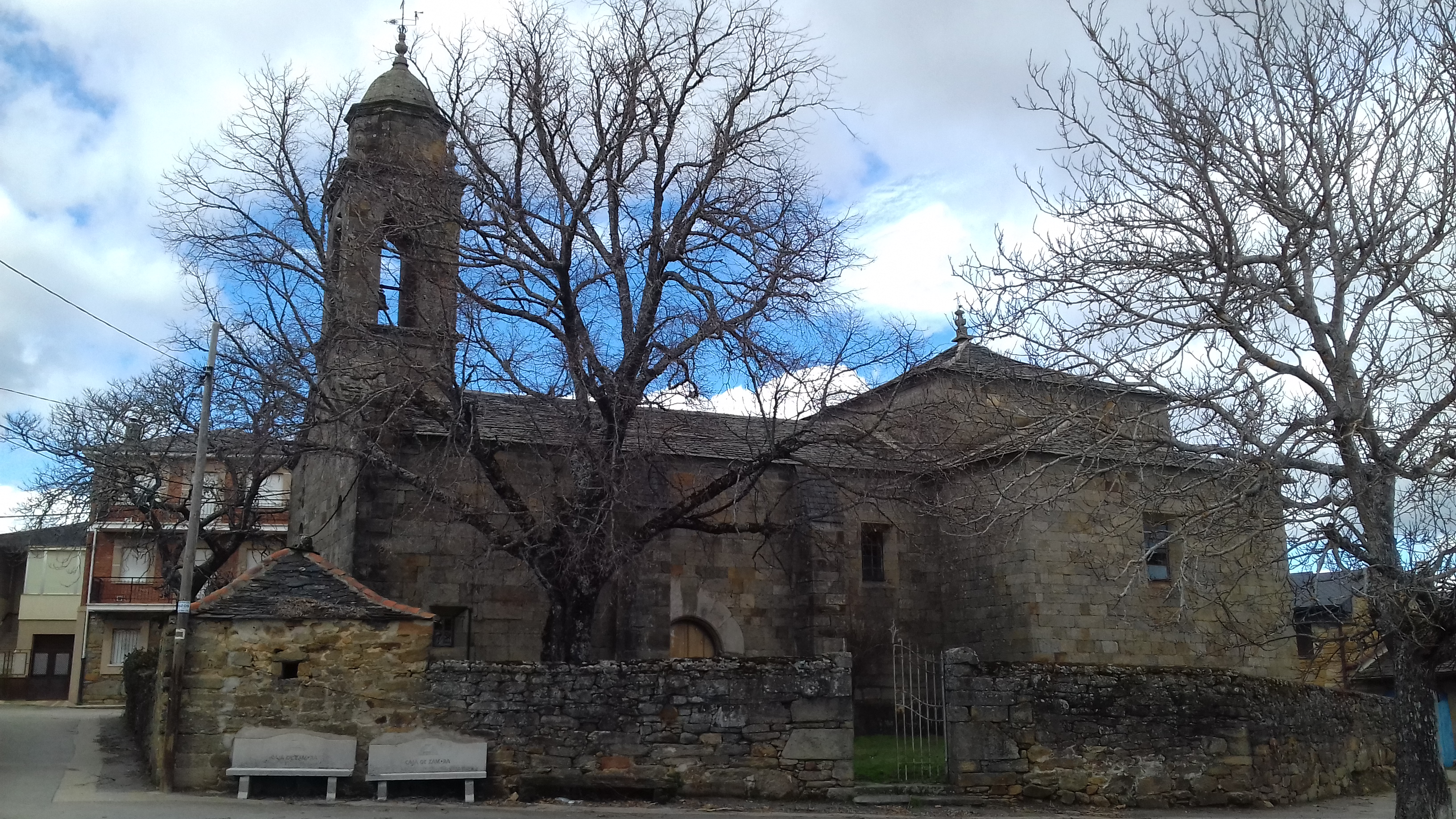
- Interactive map of Palacios de Sanabria, Spain
- Country: Spain
- Autonomous community: Castile and León
- Province: Zamora
- Municipality: Palacios de Sanabria

Area
  - Total: 36.87 km^{2} (14.24 sq mi)
- Elevation: 954 m (3,130 ft)

Population (2025-01-01)
  - Total: 233
  - Density: 6.32/km^{2} (16.4/sq mi)
- Time zone: UTC+1 (CET)
  - Summer (DST): UTC+2 (CEST)

Palacios de Sanabria is a municipality located in the province of Zamora, Castile and León, Spain. According to 2025 INE figures, the municipality had a population of 233.

== Town hall ==
Palacios de Sanabria is home to the town hall of 4 towns:

- Palacios de Sanabria (124 inhabitants, INE 2020).
- Vime de Sanabria (65 inhabitants, INE 2020).
- Otero de Sanabria (24 inhabitants, INE 2020).
- Remesal de Sanabria (17 inhabitants, INE 2020).
