= Galende =

Coordinates: 42°06′N 6°40′W

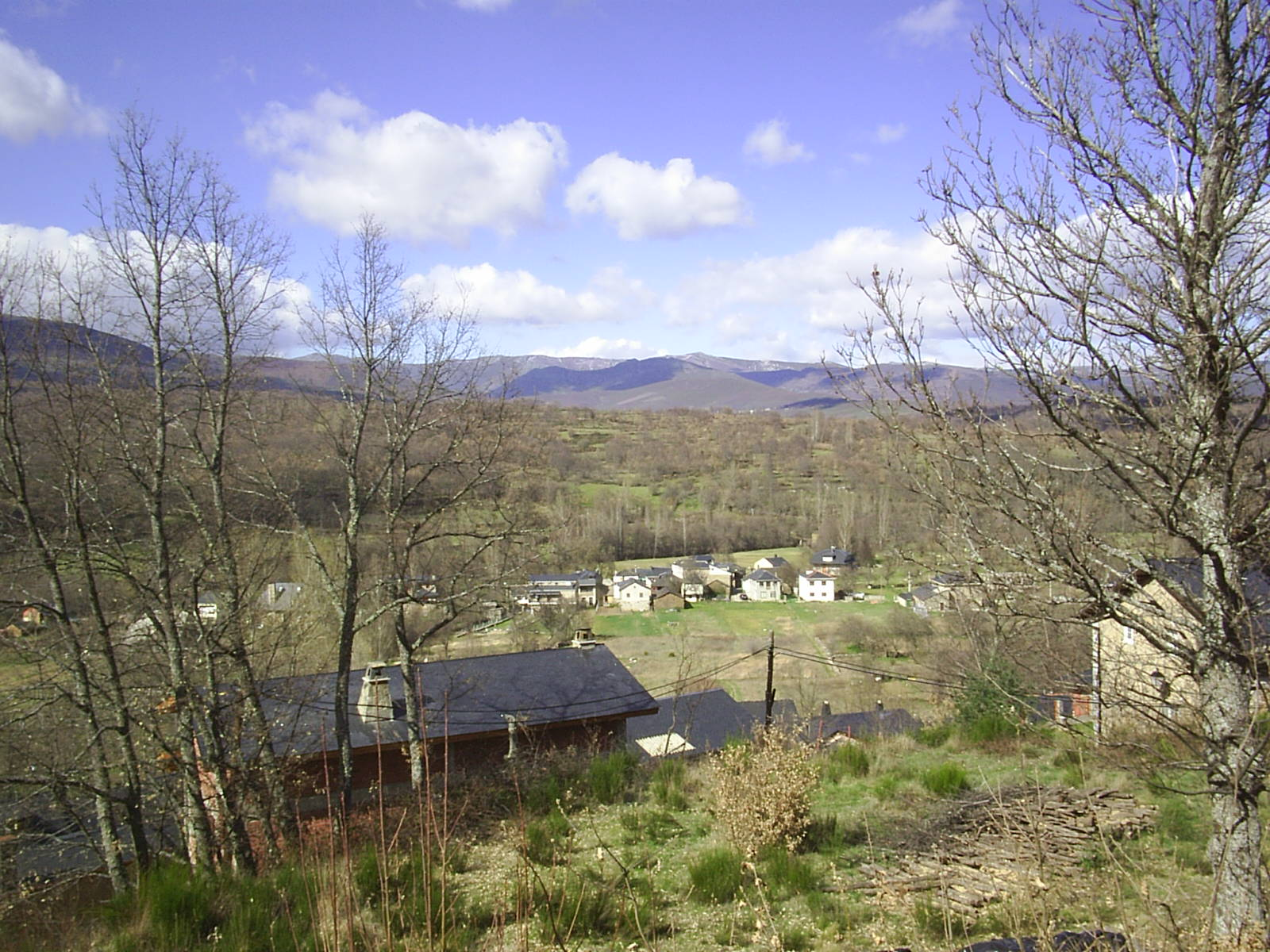

- Flag Coat of arms
- Interactive map of Galende
- Country: Spain
- Autonomous community: Castile and León
- Province: Zamora
- Municipality: Galende

Area
  - Total: 90 km^{2} (35 sq mi)

Population (2025-01-01)
  - Total: 1,019
  - Density: 11/km^{2} (29/sq mi)
- Time zone: UTC+1 (CET)
  - Summer (DST): UTC+2 (CEST)
- Website: www.aytogalende.com

Galende is a municipality located in the province of Zamora, Castile and León, Spain. According to the 2009 census (INE), the municipality has a population of 1,313 inhabitants.
