= Caro (surname) =

Caro is a surname. Notable people with the surname include:

- Abraham ben Raphael Caro, Turkish rabbi
- Alberto Caro (born 1937), Venezuelan chess master
- Annibale Caro (1507–1566), Italian poet
- Anthony Caro (1924–2013), British sculptor
- Antonio Caro (1950–2021), Colombian conceptual artist
- David Caro (c.1782–1839), German pedagogue
- Elme Marie Caro (1826–1887), French philosopher
- Esperanza Elena Caro (1906–1985), Spanish embroiderer
- Ezekiel Caro (1844–1915), German rabbi and historian
- Heinrich Caro (1834–1910), German industrial chemist
- Horatio Caro (1862–1920), British chess player
- Isaac ben Joseph Caro (1458–1535), Spanish rabbi
- Isabelle Caro (1982–2010), French actress
- Jane Caro (born 1957), Australian commentator, author and academic
- José Caro Sureda (1764–1813), Spanish army officer
- José María Caro Martínez (1830–1916), Chilean politician
- José María Caro Rodríguez (1866–1958), Chilean cardinal
- Joseph Caro (1488–1575), rabbi, scholar
- Joseph Chayyim Caro (1800–1895), Polish rabbi
- Juan Caro Sureda (1775–1826), Spanish army officer
- Julio Caro Baroja (1914–1995), Spanish anthropologist, historian, and linguist
- Julio de Caro (1899–1980), Argentine tango musician
- Marc Caro (born 1956), French filmmaker
- María Pascuala Caro Sureda (1768–1827), Spanish philosopher
- Mike Caro (born 1944), American professional poker player
- Niki Caro (born 1966), New Zealand film director, producer and screenwriter
- Nikodem Caro (1871–1935), German industrial chemist
- Nydia Caro (born 1948), Puerto Rican singer and actress
- Omari Caro (born 1991), Jamaican–English rugby player
- Pauline Cassin Caro (1828–1901), French novelist
- Pedro Caro Fontes, 2nd Marquis de La Romana (1717–1775), Spanish army officer
- Pedro Caro Sureda, 3rd Marquis of La Romana (1761–1811), Spanish army officer
- Pio Caro Baroja (1928–2015), Spanish film and television director
- Rafael Caro Quintero (born 1952), Mexican drug lord
- Robert Caro (born 1935), American journalist and biographer
- Steve Martin Caro (1948–2020), American singer
- Ventura Caro (1731–1808), Spanish army officer

== See also ==
- Caro (given name)
- Karo (name)
- Cari (name)
- Carlo (name)
- Charo (name)
