= Puebla de Sanabria =

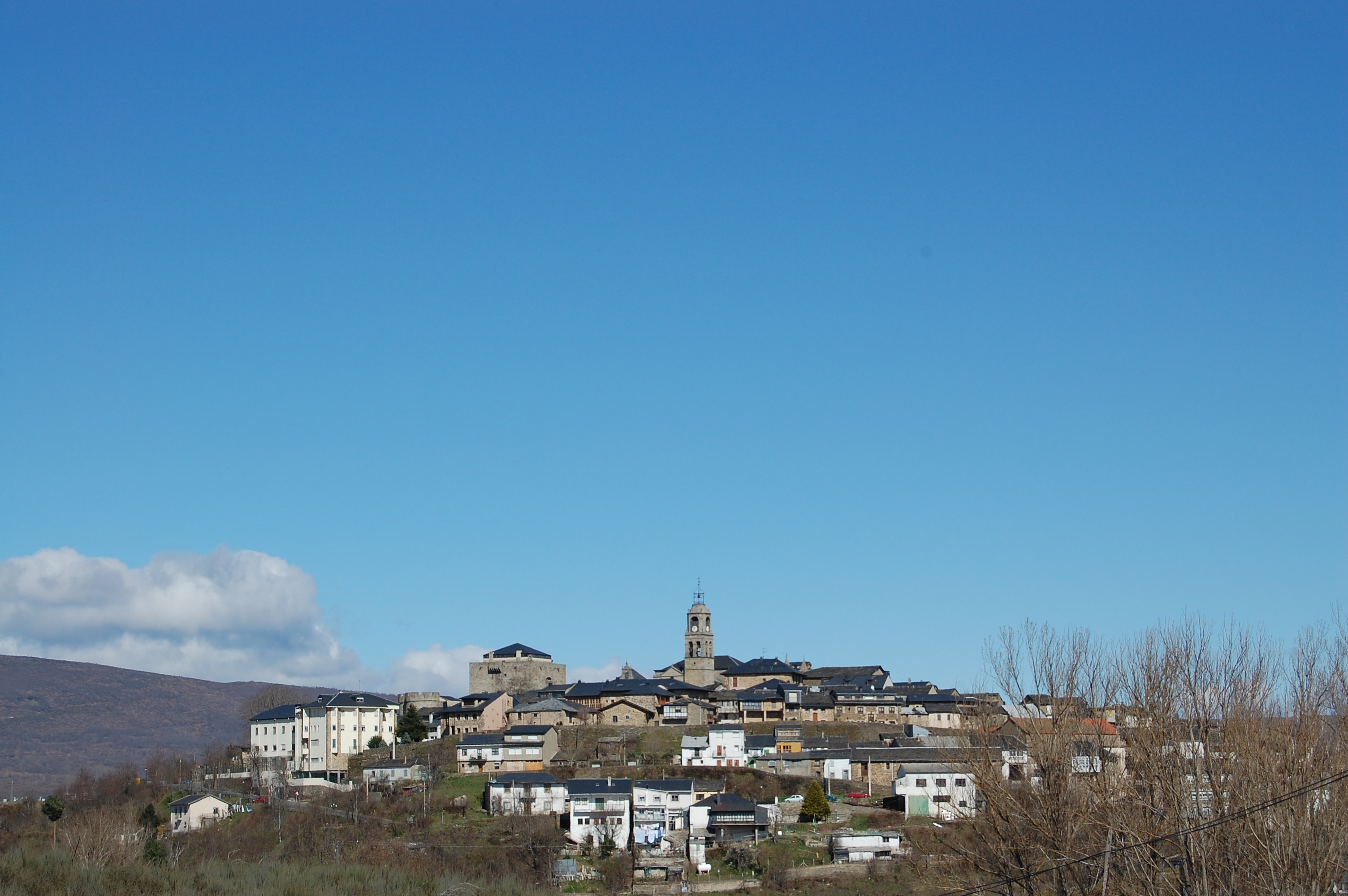

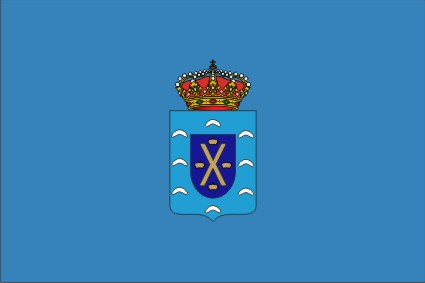
- Flag Coat of arms

- Location in Spain.
- Coordinates: 42°3′19″N 6°38′01″W
- Country: Spain
- Autonomous community: Castile and León
- Province: Zamora
- Comarca: Sanabria

Government
  - Mayor: José Fernández Blanco

Area
  - Total: 81.39 km^{2} (31.42 sq mi)
- Elevation: 960 m (3,150 ft)

Population (2025-01-01)
  - Total: 1,378
  - Density: 16.93/km^{2} (43.85/sq mi)
- Demonym: Merujero/a
- Time zone: UTC+1 (CET)
  - Summer (DST): UTC+2 (CEST)
- Website: Official website

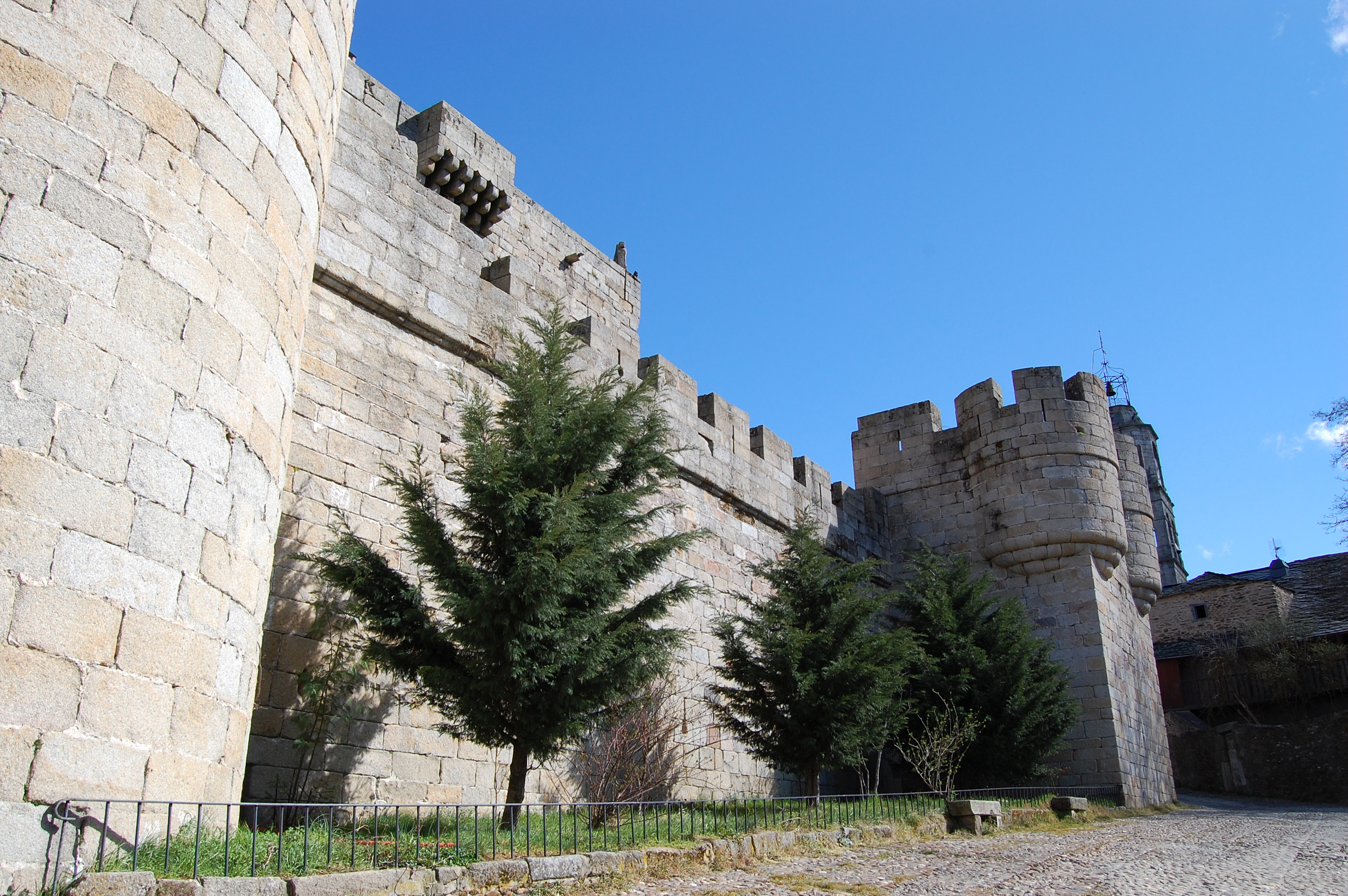
Castle of Puebla de Sanabria

Puebla de Sanabria (Spanish pronunciation: [ˈpweβla ðe saˈnaβɾja]; Leonese: Puebla de Senabria, La Viella) is a small town located in the north-western part of the province of Zamora in Spain, between the rivers Tera and Castro.

It is the economic and political centre of the comarca of Sanabria.

== History ==
One of the oldest settlements in the province of Zamora, its roots date back to around the year 509, when it appears in a record from the Council of Lugo. However, some authors consider that the information found therein refers to the whole region rather than the town itself. More accurate documentation from around the 10th century, in which is mentioned as "urbe Senabrie", indicate it as organization center for the surrounding area.

=== Peninsular War ===
In early March 1809, General La Romana left some 2,000 men, under General La Carrera, at Puebla de Sanabria, and departed to strike back into Galicia with 6,000 infantry. Marching on Villafranca, he forced the French garrison there to surrender after a fierce battle.

Towards the end of May, La Carrera left a small detachment of 200 men at Sanabria and marched up to Santiago de Compostela to form the core of the Division of the Minho, the newly raised insurrectionary army that Morillo and Garcia del Barrio had been training and, at the Combat at Campo de Estrella on 22 May, would defeat Maucune's four battalions and a regiment of chasseurs.

Marshal Soult's French 2nd Corps arrived at Sanabria on 22-23 June 1809 where it rested before heading off on 29 June 29, with Mermet, Delaborde, and Lorge marching to Benavente, and Merle and Heudelet to Zamora.

On 29 July 1810, the Spanish general Taboada, who had taken command of Echevarria's brigade at Sanabria, was driven from the town by 5,000 French troops led by General Seras, who had set out from his headquarters at Benavente with the intention of threatening the frontier of the Tras-os-Montes, in the north of Portugal. General Silveira then gathered all the Portuguese militia of his district at Braganza to defend the frontier. But instead of continuing his advance, Serras turned back, leaving some 400–600 troops (a battalion of the 2nd Swiss Regiment and a squadron of horse) at Sanabria, and withdrew to Zamora. As soon as he was far enough away, Silveira and Taboada united their forces and, on 4 August, attacked the French force that had been left in the town, routing it. The French troops finally surrendered some six days later, about 20 officers and 350 men, all that remained of the original force, being taken prisoners. Serras, on learning of the attack, hurried back but found Puebla de Sanabria empty, for the allies forces had made off with their prisoners and taken to the mountains. Serra then went back to Benavente, and Taboada reoccupied Puebla de Sanabria, where he remained, unopposed.

== Main sights ==
- The Castle, built around the 15th century by the Count of Benavente
- Romanesque-Gothic church of Nuestra Señora de Azogue (13th century)
- Hermitage of San Cayetano, in Baroque style (17th century)
- Isabeline Town Hall (16th century).
- Fort of San Carlos

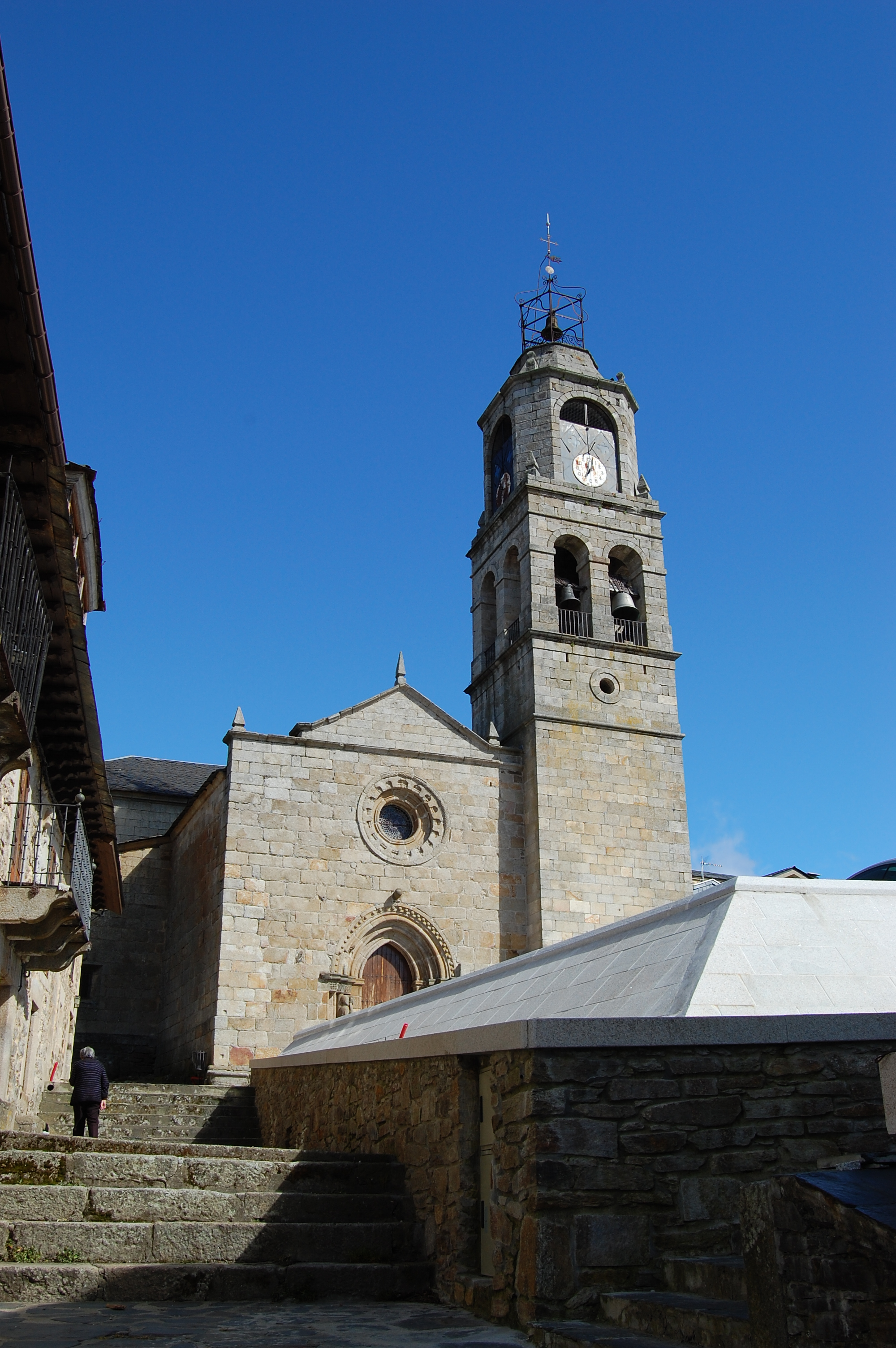
Church of Nuestra Señora del Azogue.

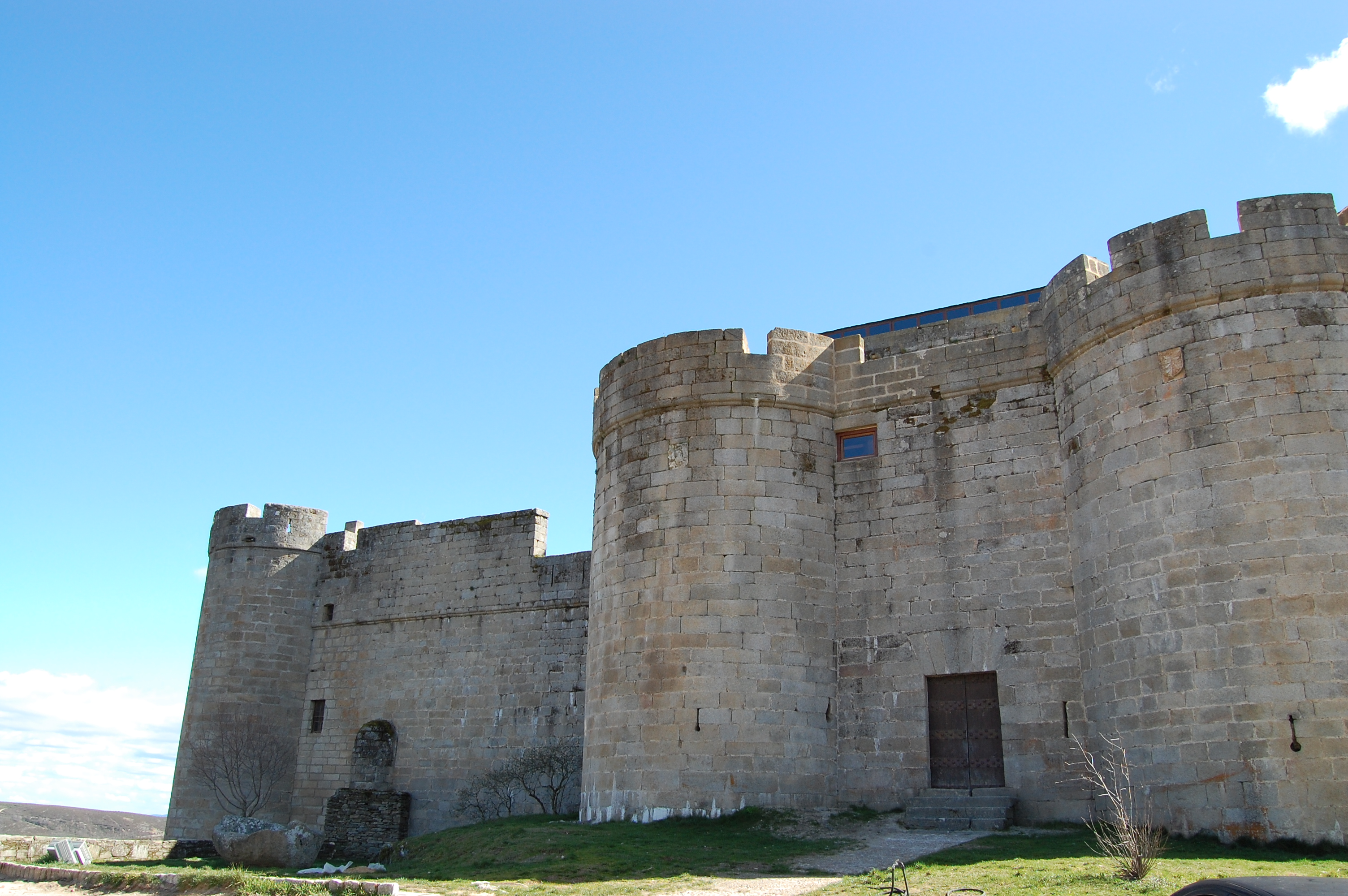
Castle of Puebla de Sanabria, Main entrance.

== Notable people ==
- Jesús Requejo San Román (1880-1936), Catholic activist, politician

== See also ==
- Lago de Sanabria
