= Sanabria Castle =

Coordinates: 42°03′19″N 6°38′02″W

- Puebla de Sanabria, Zamora
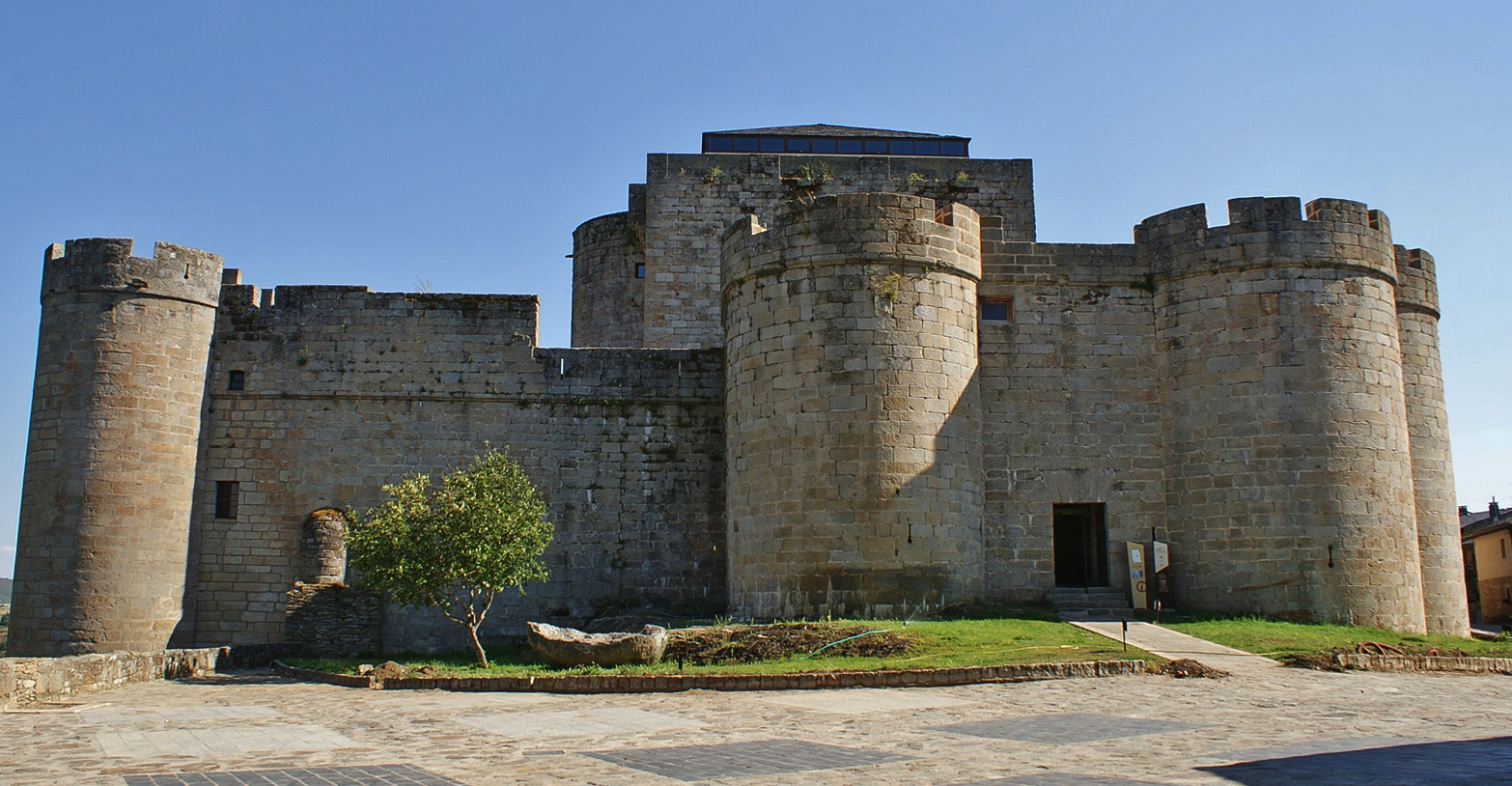

Location
- Height: 23 m (keep)

Site history
- Battles/wars: Peninsular War

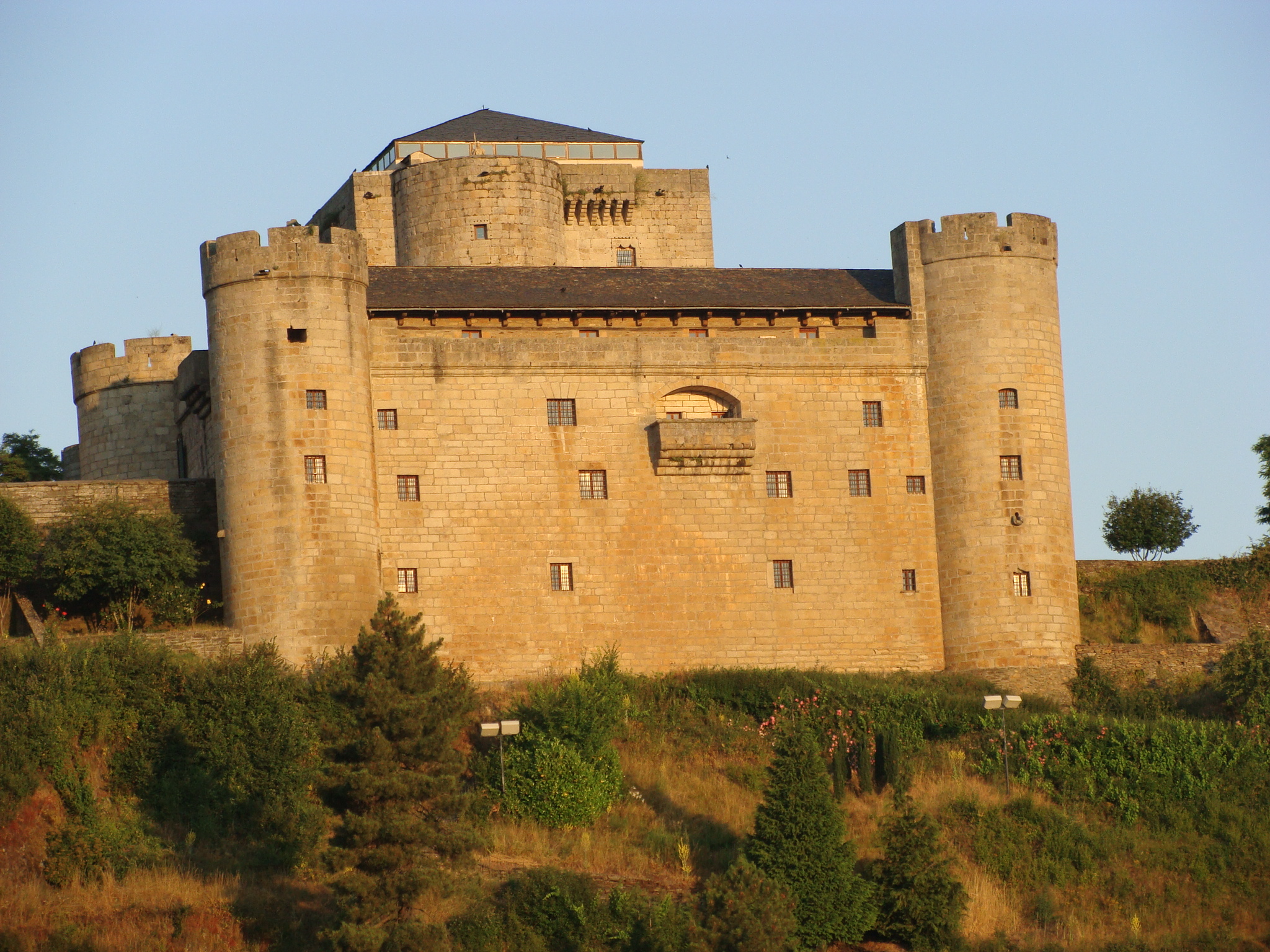
Castle viewed from the side

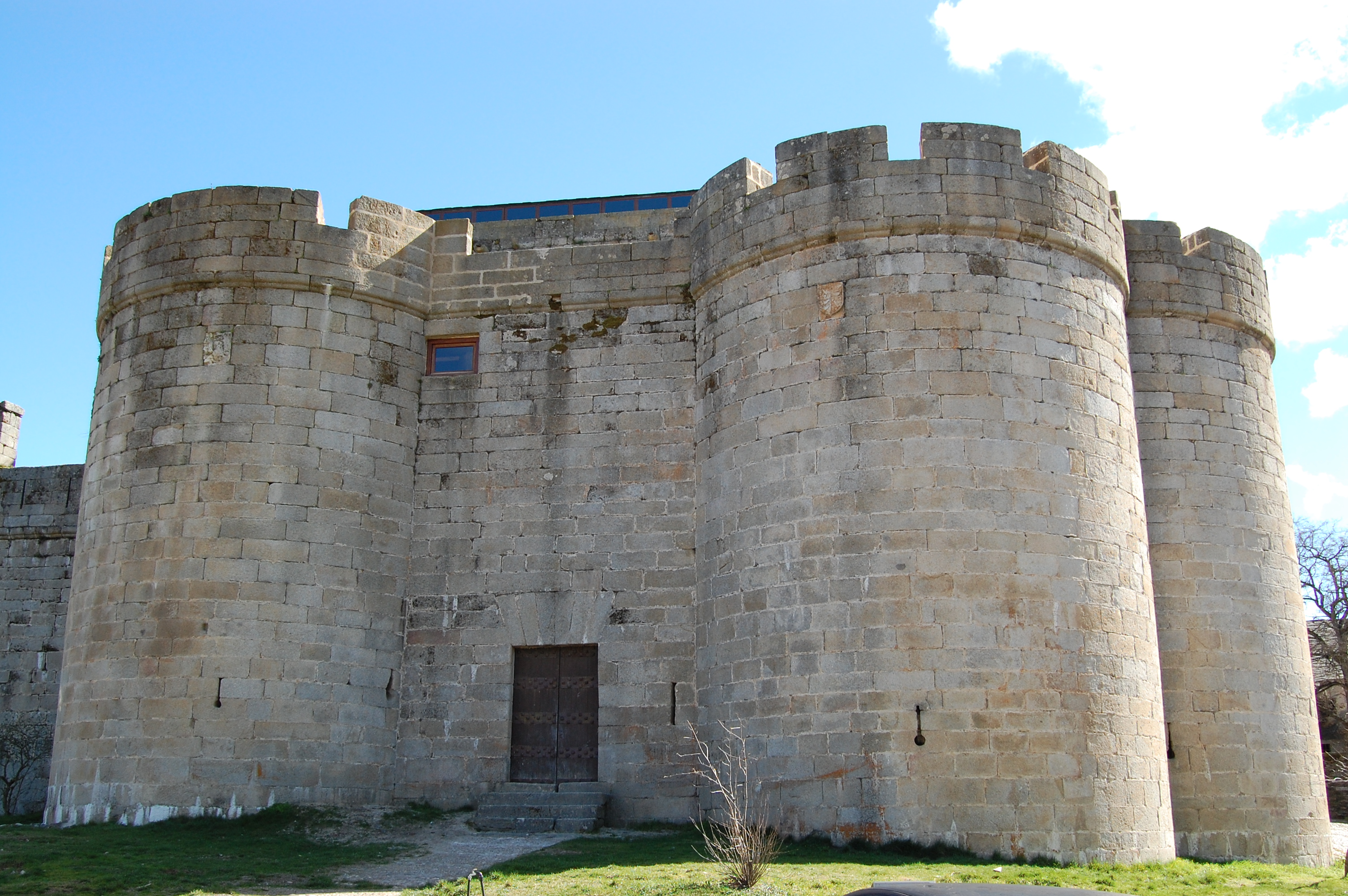
Main entrance

Sanabria Castle (Castillo de Puebla de Sanabria and Castillo de los Condes de Benavente) is a 15th-century castle overlooking the town of Puebla de Sanabria, Zamora, Spain.

== Works ==
The works on the current building were started in 1455 by Rodrigo Alonso Pimentel, 4th Count of Benavente and his wife, María Pacheco, daughter of Juan Pacheco, 1st Duke of Escalona, over the remains of the square plan castle that had existed since before 1220.

Although the works were interrupted for several decades, due to hereditary disputes regarding the ownership of the town, the 4th Count was able to re-start them in 1480, finally finishing them in 1499. In 1506, the Queen of Castile, Joanna of Castile, stayed at the castle with her husband, Philip I of Castile. The 5th Count completed further works in 1510.

Given its strategic location, near the border with Portugal, it suffered the direct consequences of the successive battles during the 17th century and although around the time of the Portuguese Restoration War (1640–1668) the city walls were being rebuilt and reinforced, the maestre de Campo who had taken command of the fortress declared it in ruins in 1647.

During the War of the Spanish Succession (1701–1715), Anglo-Portuguese troops attacked the area and in 1710, the castle was captured by Portuguese troops who held it until 1716.

The nearby fort of San Carlos, south of the castle, and now in ruins, was possibly built around that time (c. 1706). (Note: The fort of San Carlos may even have been built around the time of the Portuguese Restoration War (1640–1668) when major defensive works were carried out at Sanabria. (Echarri-Iribarren 2017: p. 239.))

In the early 1720s, Charles Robelin, one of the engineers recruited by the Marquis of Verboom, (Note: The King had commissioned Verboom to establish a Corps of Engineers in 1711. (Echarri-Iribarren 2017: p. 242.)) the Flemish-born military engineer in the service of the King of Spain, King Philip V, carried out repair works on the castle and its defences. He then projected further improvements to the castle, such as building barracks and vaults that would withstand bombardment.

As for the San Carlos fort, Robelin was highly critical of almost every aspect of it: it was badly constructed and too small.

His project was based around four main items:

- Extend a large bastion or bulwark beyond the fort of San Carlos and covering it over
- A large tenaille to prevent an enemy attack from the river
- A counterguard
- A levee with a system of sluice-gates to contain the nearby stream and which could be flooded to hinder and delay an attack from the west.

Although it is not known if he actually carried out works at the castle, in 1766 Juan Martín Cermeño also drew up plans for constructing barracks there for troops, and an arsenal in the keep. On the other hand, Cermeño was highly critical of Robelin's proposals for the castle.

Further works were carried out on the castle during the Carlist Wars in the 19th century. Ownership of the castle was transferred to the town council in 1887 and towards the end of the 20th century major restoration works were carried out on it.

It was declared a Cultural Landmark by the regional government of Castile and León in 2022.

== Peninsular War ==
In early March 1809, General La Romana decided to leave the weakest of his battalions and his sick at Puebla de Sanabria, in order to strike back into Galicia. Leaving some 2,000 men, under General La Carrera, he had descended down into Ponferrada with 6,000 infantry by mid-March. On learning that the French garrison at Villafranca was completely isolated, he marched there, forcing its garrison to surrender after a fierce battle.

Towards the end of May, La Carrera left a small detachment of 200 men at Sanabria and marched up to Santiago de Compostela where he would form the core of the Division of the Minho, the newly raised insurrectionary army that Morillo and Garcia del Barrio had been training and, at the Combat at Campo de Estrella on 22 May, would defeat Maucune's four battalions and a regiment of chasseurs.

Marshal Soult's French 2nd Corps arrived at Sanabria on 22-23 June 1809 where it rested before heading off on 29 June 29, with Mermet, Delaborde, and Lorge marching to Benavente, and Merle and Heudelet to Zamora.

On 29 July 1810, the Spanish general Taboada, who had taken command of Echevarria's brigade at Sanabria, was driven from the town by 5,000 French troops led by General Serras, who had set out from his headquarters at Benavente with the intention of threatening the frontier of the Tras-os-Montes, in the north of Portugal. General Silveira then gathered all the Portuguese militia of his district at Braganza to defend the frontier. But instead of advancing, Serras turned back, leaving some 400–600 troops (a battalion of the 2nd Swiss Regiment and a squadron of horse) at Sanabria, and withdrew to Zamora. As soon as he was far enough away, Silveira and Taboada united their forces and, on 4 August, attacked the French force that had been left in the town, routing it. The French troops finally surrendered some six days later, about 20 officers and 350 men, all that remained of the original force, being taken prisoners. Serras, on learning of the attack, hurried back but found Puebla de Sanabria empty, for the allies forces had made off with their prisoners and taken to the mountains. Serra then went back to Benavente, and Taboada reoccupied Puebla de Sanabria, where he remained, unopposed.

== Bibliography ==
- Echarri Iribarren, Víctor (2017). "El Ingeniero General Juan Martín Zermeño y las fortificaciones de frontera: Pamplona y Puebla de Sanabria a mediados del sigo XVIII". Centro de Estudios de Arquitectura Militar de Almeida (CEAMA) CEAMA, N.º 15 - 2017.
