= Pedro Caro Fontes, 2nd Marquis de La Romana =

Spanish army officer (1717–1775)

Pedro Caro Fontes
- Born: 8 July 1717; Novelda, Alicante, Spain
- Died: 8 July 1775 (aged 58) Algiers, Algeria
- Conflicts: War of the Austrian Succession; Siege of Cuneo; Battle of Madonna dell'Olmo; Siege of Villafranca (1744); Spanish–Algerian War (1775–1785); Invasion of Algiers (1775)

Pedro Caro Fontes y Maza de Lizana, 2nd Marquis de La Romana (1717–1775) was a Spanish military commander.

As well as being the elder brother of Ventura Caro, future Captain general of the Army, Spain's highest military rank, the Marquis was the father of three brothers who would become leading Spanish military commanders of the Peninsular War: Pedro Caro y Sureda, 3rd Marquis of La Romana (1761–1811), José Caro Sureda (1764–1813) and Juan Caro Sureda (1775–1820).

== Early career ==
Caro Fontes enlisted in the Real Armada in 1733 and the following year he purchased his commission as a lieutenant colonel of the Oran Dragoon Regiment, unit with which he saw action at the conquests of Naples and Sicily.

He later saw action at the sieges of Demonte (19 August 1744), and Cuneo (13 September), as well as at the battle of Madonna dell'Olmo and at the Siege of Villafranca (1744).

Returning to the Navy, he was appointed frigate captain in 1745. In 1748, he transferred as a coronel to the Belgian Cavalry Regiment and the following year to the Sagunto Cavalry Regiment, unit with which he was garrisoned at Guissona, in Catalonia.

In 1755 he was appointed coronel of the Batavia Dragoon Regiment garrisoned at Palma de Mallorca and promoted to Cavalry brigadier in 1761. The regiment became the Almansa Dragoon Regiment in 1766 and the Marquis continued in command until being promoted to field marshal in 1770.

== Death ==
When O'Reilly prepared his expedition to Algeria in 1775, the Marquis was given command of a brigade comprising the Guadalajara and King's Regiments. On disembarking on the beach on 8 July, he was killed by two shots to the chest.
