= Requejo (surname) =

Requejo is a surname. Notable people with the surname include:

- Jesús Requejo San Román (1880-1936), Spanish politician
- Jesús Tartilán Requejo (born 1940), Spanish footballer and coach
- Severino Requejo (born 1941), Spanish sport shooter
- Leuris Pupo Requejo (born 1977), Cuban shooter
- John Requejo (born 1996), American soccer player
