= Felipe Augusto de Saint-Marcq =

Spanish military officer

- Born: 16 June 1762; Taintignies, Austrian Netherlands
- Died: 1831 (aged 68–69); Madrid
- Military career
- Allegiance: Spain
- Conflicts: War of the Pyrenees; War of the Oranges; Peninsular War

Felipe Augusto de Saint Marcq y D'Ostrel (Note: Oman (1902: p. 160.) refers to him as Saint-March.) (1762–1831) was an Austrian Netherlands-born military officer in the service of the Spanish Crown. He served in the Peninsular War, commanding the Spanish forces during the Battle of Valencia.

== Early career ==
Saint-Marcq entered the Walloon Guards Regiment as a cadet in 1776, rising to the rank of captain in 1795.

He fought in 1781 in the Great Siege of Gibraltar and in 1793 in the War of the Pyrenees against the French Convention, at the end of which he was promoted to brigadier. He also participated in the invasion of Portugal in 1801.

== Peninsular War ==
When the war broke out in 1808, he was able to escape from Madrid when it was occupied by the invading French Army. He made his way to Valencia, where the local junta promoted him to field marshal.

Following the victories of Marshal Bon-Adrien Jeannot de Moncey's troops (Note: Oman (1902: p. 126.) points out that there was not a single veteran unit among Moncey's troops: Moncey's force was [...] eight battalions of conscripts formed in 'provisional regiments' and two 'provisional regiments' of dragoons, plus a Westphalian battalion, and two Spanish corps, who deserted en masse when they were informed that they were to march against Valencia in company with the marshal's French troops. He had not one single company or squadron of men belonging to the old imperial army.) at minor actions and combats in the region, including the rout of General Pedro Adorno's 3,000 men at the Cabrillas defile (near Siete Aguas, Valencia), on 24 June 1808, Saint-Marcq was charged with bringing together the routed troops and raising more recruits to defend Valencia. With a force of some four thousand recruits, which he was able to add to Conde de Cervellon's 7,000 or 8,000 regular troops, and Brigadier José Caro Sureda's 2,000-strong column of the newly raised Regiment of Cazadores de Valencia, he was able to help repel Moncey's two successive attacks on the city. (Note: While Isabel puts the figure at 11,000 French troops, Oman (1902: p. 126.) puts Moncey's force at 8,000. At the other extreme, Vicente Martínez Colomer, writing in 1810 and cited by Gómez (1868: p. 166.), puts the figure at 8,000 Spanish forces, of whom 1,000 were veteran regular troops versus 12,000 experienced French infantry troops plus 1,800 horse.)

Saint-Marcq later participated in the lifting of the first siege of Zaragoza where he came to the aid of José de Palafox y Melzi against the forces of French General Verdier.

Saint-Marcq remained under the orders of Palafox at Zaragoza during the defense of the city, for which he was promoted to lieutenant general. When the city eventually surrendered to the French on 20 February 1809, he was taken prisoner and sent to Nancy, where he would remain until the end of the war in 1814.

When Ferdinand VII of Spain returned to the throne, Saint-Marcq returned to Spain. He was appointed to Captain General of Galicia, Valencia and Aragón, posts he held until the start of the Trienio Liberal, when he was banished, in 1822, to Valencia. With the 1823 French invasion and the subsequent restoration of King Ferdinand, Saint-Marcq was appointed Captain General of Valencia, Murcia and of Aragon between 1824 and 1830.

== Death ==
Saint-Marcq died during a cholera epidemic in Madrid in 1831.
