= Caro (given name) =

Caro is a given name that is an alternate spelling of Carol and a short form of Caroline. Notable people with the name include:

- caro♡ (born 1990), French musician
- Caro Crawford Brown (1908–2001) American journalist
- Caro Cult (born 1994), German actress
- Caro Dahl (1890–1979), Norwegian tennis player
- Caro Dawes (1866–1957), Second Lady of the United States
- Caro Emerald (born 1981), Dutch pop and jazz singer
- Caro Feely (born 1968) South African winemaker
- Caro Fraser (1953–2020), British novelist
- Caro Jones (1923–2009), Canadian-American actress and casting director
- Caro Lamoureux (1904–1998), Canadian soprano
- Caro Llewellyn (born 1965), Australian festival director and writer
- Caro Lucas (1949–2010), Iranian-Armenian scientist
- Caro Benigno Massalongo (1852–1928), Italian botanist
- Caro Meldrum-Hanna, Australian journalist
- Caro Newling (born 1957), English theatre producer
- Caro Niederer (born 1963), Swiss artist
- Caro Ramsay, Scottish writer
- Caro Roma (1866–1937), American singer and composer
- Caro Soles, Canadian author
- Caro Wow (born 1999), Italian singer-songwriter

== See also ==
- Caro (surname)
- Caroline (name)
- Charo (name)
