= Purchase of commissions in the British Army =

Practice of paying money to be made an officer

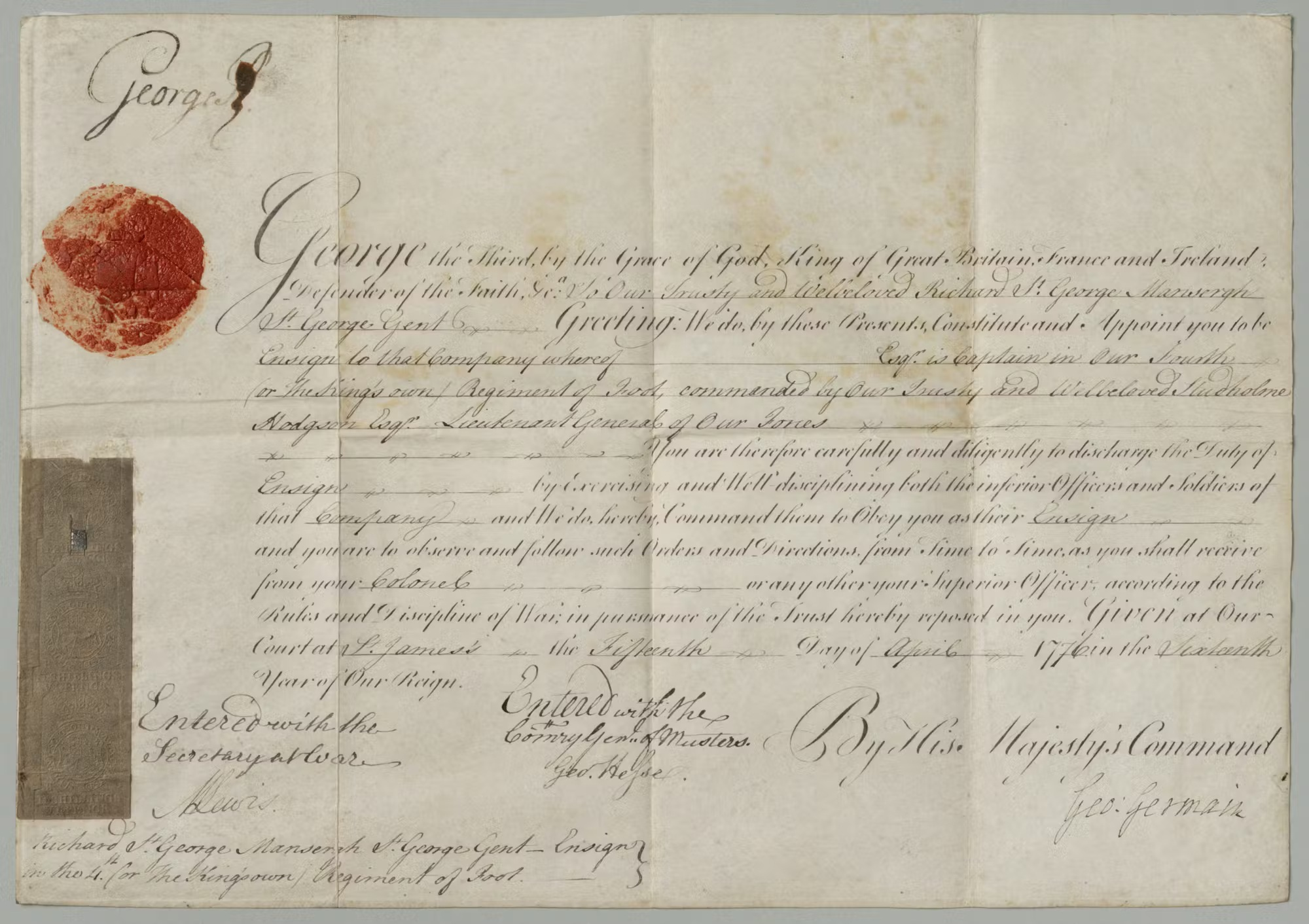
Richard St George's commission as an ensign in the 4th Regiment of Foot, issued on 15 April 1776

Between the 17th and 19th centuries, officers' commissions in infantry and cavalry units of the English and British armies could be purchased. This avoided the need to wait to be promoted for merit or seniority, and was the usual way to obtain a rank in both armies. The practice began in 1683 during the reign of Charles II of England. It existed until it was abolished on 1 November 1871 as part of the Cardwell Reforms. Formally, the purchase price of a commission was a cash bond for good behaviour, liable to be forfeited if the officer in question was found guilty of cowardice, desertion, or gross misconduct.

== Great Britain and Ireland ==
Only commissions in cavalry and infantry regiments could be purchased, up to the rank of colonel. Commissions in the Royal Engineers and the Royal Artillery were awarded to those who graduated from a course at the Royal Military Academy, Woolwich and subsequent promotion was by seniority. Moreover, the Royal Navy never practised the sale of commissions, officer promotion being solely by merit or seniority (at least in theory).

=== Values ===
The official values of commissions varied by branch (see below). Payments in excess of regulation (non-official) usually accorded with the differing social prestige of different regiments.

For example, in 1837 the costs of commissions were:

£, price of commissions, in 1837 (2025 equivalent)
| Rank | Infantry | Cavalry | Life Guards | Foot Guards | Half pay difference |
|---|---|---|---|---|---|
| Cornet/Ensign | 450 (44k) | 840 (81k) | 1,260 (122k) | 1,200 (116k) | 150 (15k) |
| Lieutenant | 700 (68k) | 1,190 (115k) | 1,785 (173k) | 2,050 (198k) | 365 (35k) |
| Captain | 1,800 (174k) | 3,225 (312k) | 3,500 (339k) | 4,800 (465k) | 511 (49k) |
| Major | 3,200 (310k) | 4,575 (443k) | 5,350 (518k) | 8,300 (803k) | 949 (92k) |
| Lieutenant Colonel | 4,500 (436k) | 6,175 (598k) | 7,250 (702k) | 9,000 (871k) | 1,314 (127k) |

These prices were incremental. To purchase a promotion, an officer only had to pay the difference in price between his existing rank and the desired rank.

=== Regimental and social factors ===
Theoretically, a commission could be sold only for its official value and was to be offered first to the next most senior officer in the same regiment. In practice, there was also an unofficial "over-regulation price" or "regimental value", which might double the official cost. Desirable commissions in fashionable regiments were often sold to the highest bidder after an auction. A self-interested senior officer might well regard his commission as his pension fund and would encourage the increase of its value. An officer who incurred or inherited debts might sell his commission to raise funds.

Social exclusiveness was preserved not only by money, as regimental colonels were permitted to – and often did – refuse the purchase of a commission in their regiment by a man who had the necessary money but was not from a social background to their liking. This was especially the case in the Household and Guards regiments, which were dominated by the nobility. Elsewhere, however, it was not unknown for Colonels to lend deserving senior non-commissioned officers or warrant officers the funds necessary to purchase commissions.

Not all first commissions or promotions were paid for. If an officer was killed in action or appointed to the Staff (usually through being promoted to Major General), this created a series of "non-purchase vacancies" within his regiment. These could also occur when new regiments or battalions were created, or when the establishments of existing units were expanded. However, all vacancies resulting from officers dying of disease, retiring (whether on full or half pay) or resigning their commissions were "purchase vacancies". A period, usually of several years, had to elapse before an officer who succeeded to a non-purchase vacancy could sell his commission. For instance, if a Captain were promoted to Major to fill a non-purchase vacancy but decided to quit the Army immediately afterwards, he would receive only the value of his Captain's commission.

=== Active service ===
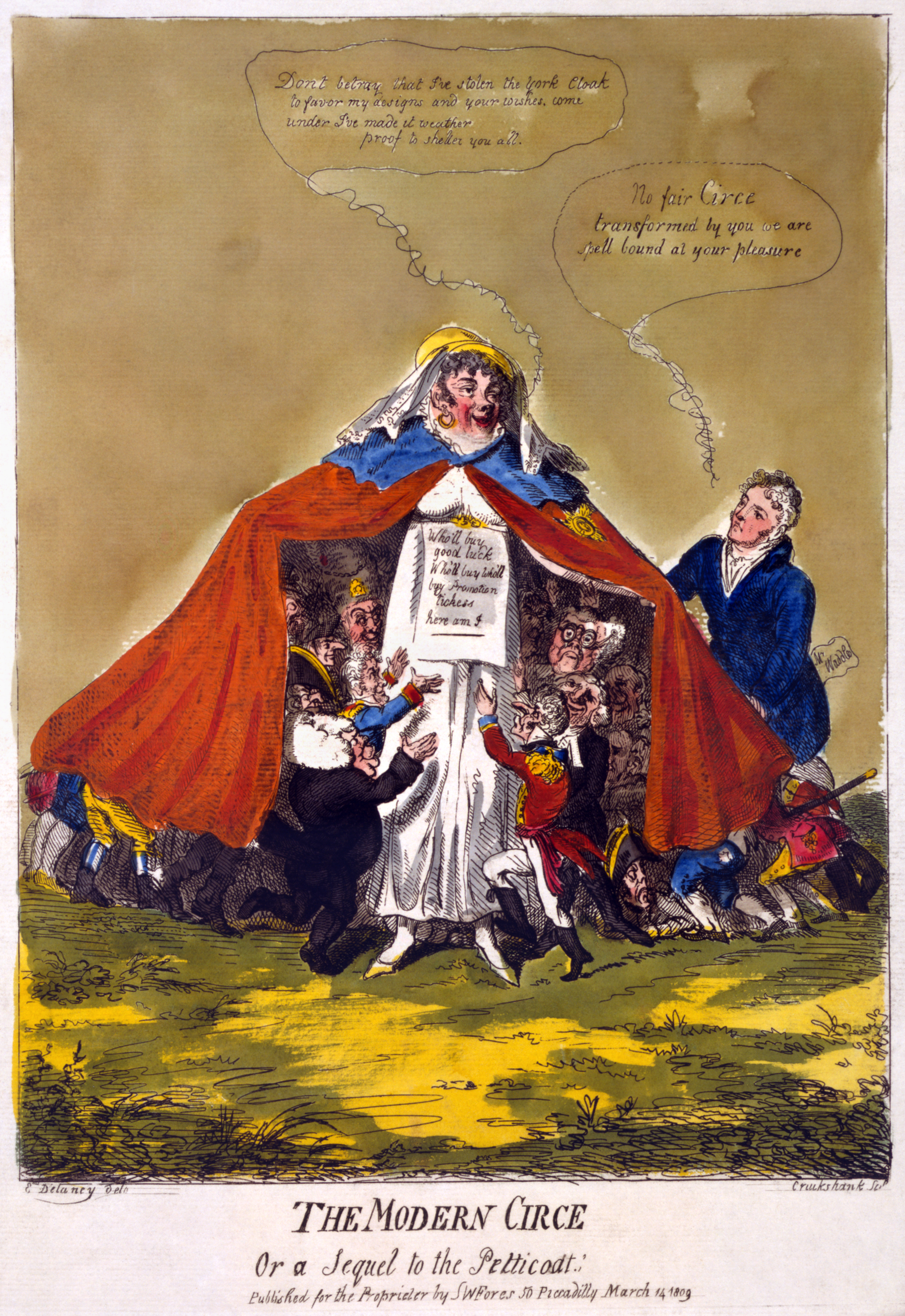
1806 cartoon mocking Mary Anne Clarke's sales of commissions

Various regulations required minimum durations of service in a given rank and restricted officers from selling or exchanging their commissions to avoid active service. Exceptions and exemptions from these were at the discretion of the Commander in Chief. In 1806 there was a major scandal when it was discovered that Mary Anne Clarke, the mistress of then Commander in Chief Prince Frederick, Duke of York and Albany, was engaged in selling commissions for her personal profit.

The worst potential effects of the system were mitigated during intensive conflicts such as the Napoleonic Wars by heavy casualties among senior ranks, which resulted in many non-purchase vacancies, and also discouraged wealthy dilettantes who were not keen on active service, thereby ensuring that many commissions were exchanged for their nominal value only. There was also the possibility of promotion to brevet army ranks for deserving officers. An officer might be a subaltern or Captain in his regiment, but might hold a higher local rank if attached to other units or allied armies, or might be given a higher Army rank by the Commander-in-Chief or the Monarch in recognition of meritorious service or a notable feat of bravery. Officers bearing dispatches giving news of a victory (such as Waterloo), often received such promotion, and might be specially selected by a General in the field for this purpose.

=== Abolition of the practice ===
The malpractices associated with the purchase of commissions reached their height in the long peace between the Napoleonic Wars and the Crimean War, when James Brudenell, Lord Cardigan paid £35,000 (equivalent to £3,390,000 in 2025) for the lieutenant-colonelcy of the stylish 11th Hussars. It became obvious in the Crimea that the system of purchase often resulted in incompetence, such as that which resulted in the Charge of the Light Brigade, led by Cardigan. An inquiry (the Commission on Purchase) was established in 1855, and commented unfavourably on the institution. The practice of purchase of commissions was finally abolished as part of the 1871 Cardwell reforms which made many changes to the structure and procedures of the Army.

== Other armies ==
During the eighteenth century the purchase of commissions was a common practice in many European armies, although not usually to the same extent as in Britain. In Spain, after having enlisted as a midshipman in the Spanish Navy in 1733, Pedro Caro Fontes, the future 2nd Marquis of La Romana, purchased his commission as a lieutenant colonel of a dragoon regiment the following year.

The practice had been discontinued for the French infantry in 1758, although retained in the socially more exclusive cavalry until the French Revolution. The Austrian government had attempted to place restrictions on the practice, although it continued informally. Only in the Prussian Army was it unknown. In Russia, Peter the Great mandated that all officers must start as privates, so the common method was to register an infant scion of a noble family as a private; reporting for service at the age of 15, the boy would already be promoted on seniority to a junior lieutenant or equivalent rank. This practice became gradually obsolete during the early 19th century and was formally abolished by the Russian military reforms of 1864.

== Sources ==
- Bruce, Anthony P. C.: The Purchase System in the British Army, 1660–1871. Royal Historical Society, London 1980
- Farwell, Byron, Queen Victoria's Little Wars. Wordsworth Military Library, 1973. ISBN 1-84022-216-6
- Holmes, Richard. Redcoat. HarperCollins, Hammersmith, 2001. ISBN 0-00-653152-0
- Sweetman, John (2004), "James Thomas Brudenell", Oxford Dictionary of National Biography (online ed.), Oxford University Press, doi:10.1093/ref:odnb/3765 (Subscription, Wikipedia Library access or UK public library membership required.)
- Woodham-Smith, Cecil The Reason Why: The Story of the Fatal Charge of the Light Brigade. Penguin, 1953; Reprint edition 1991. ISBN 0-14-001278-8
