= Ventura Caro =

Spanish army officer (1731–1808)

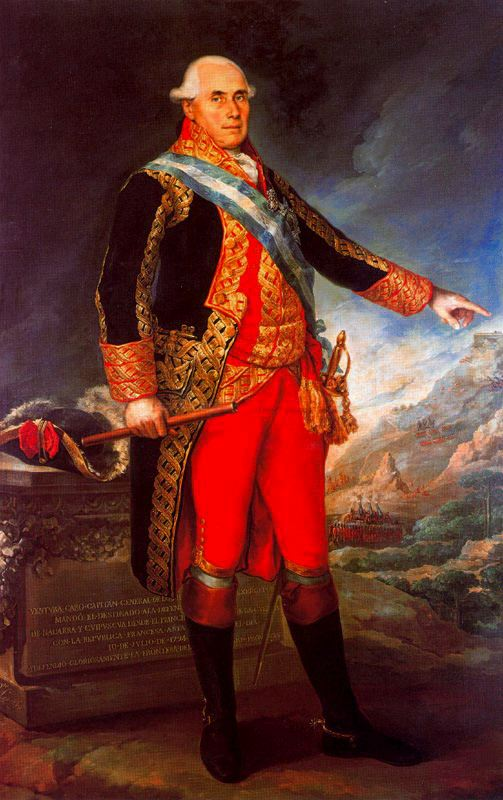
- Portrait of Ventura Caro (1799) by Vicente López Portaña
- Born: 14 July 1731; Valencia, Spain
- Died: 19 May 1808 (aged 76) Valencia
- Conflicts: Spanish invasion of Portugal (1762); Invasion of Algiers (1775); Spanish–Portuguese War (1776–1777); Anglo-French War (1778–1783); Invasion of Minorca (1781); War of the Pyrenees; Battle of Sans Culottes Camp; Great Siege of Gibraltar

Ventura Caro y Fontes (1731–1808) was a Spanish Captain general of the Army.

The younger brother of the Pedro Caro Fontes, 2nd Marquis de La Romana, Ventura Caro was the uncle of three brothers who became leading Spanish military commanders of the Peninsular War, all of whom served under him when they were younger: Pedro Caro y Sureda, 3rd Marquis of La Romana (1761–1811), José Caro Sureda (1764–1813) and Juan Caro Sureda (1775–1820)

== Early career ==
Ventura Caro enlisted in 1750 as a cadet in the Royal Walloon Guards, being promoted to fusilier alférez (ensign) in 1752 and second lieutenant in 1760.

After participating in the Spanish invasion of Portugal (1762), he was promoted to first lieutenant in 1767.

He volunteered for Alejandro O'Reilly's Invasion of Algiers (1775), where his elder brother, the 2nd Marquis de La Romana, was killed. That same year, Ventura Caro was attached, as a colonel, to the Pavia Dragoon Regiment, and the following year, during the Spanish–Portuguese War (1776–1777), was second-in-command of the Dragoon corps for Cevallos's second expedition to Río de la Plata.

Back in Spain in 1778, Caro was appointed colonel of the Almansa Dragoon Regiment and during the Anglo-French War (1778–1783) he sailed for Menorca with three dismounted cavalry squadrons of his regiment, to join Crillon's Invasion of Minorca (1781), where he distinguished himself at the siege and storming of the St. Philip's Castle, and which resulted in his promotion to Cavalry brigadier, in February 1782, and being appointed governor of the island.

Later that year, he sailed to join the Great Siege of Gibraltar, where he commanded the column of Dismounted Grenadiers, from May 1782 to February 1783. At the beginning of 1783 he was promoted to field marshal. and soon afterwards volunteered to join Antonio Barceló's expedition to bombard Algiers.

In December 1790, Carlos IV appointed him interim commander-in-chief of Galicia, and he was appointed captain general of that kingdom in 1792.

In January 1793, Caro was appointed captain general of Guipúzcoa and given command of Spain's Army of the West Pyrenees, (Note: Not to be confused with the French First Republic's Army of the Western Pyrenees, also active in the region at the same time, first under Jacques Léonard Muller, who served from October 1793 to August 1794, and later under Bon-Adrien Jeannot de Moncey.) which, shortly thereafter, would be renamed Army of Guipúzcoa and Navarra, and was ordered to take up defensive positions while the Army of Rosellón, under Ricardos, was to take the offensive at Perpignan, at the other extreme of the Pyrenees.

That same year, his nephew Pedro Caro y Sureda, 3rd Marquis of La Romana, then a brigadier, transferred to his uncle's headquarters, from which he led several brief actions, including the storming of the "almost inaccessible" castle at Chateau-Pignon, in the commune of Saint-Michel, Pyrénées-Atlantiques, where he captured the French General Gennetière on 6 June 1793. Having thus distinguished himself, the Marquis was promoted to field marshal.

At the Battle of Sans Culottes Camp (5 February 1794) Caro, after gaining some initial success in his advance across the border into France, including the capture of two of the French outposts along the Pyrenees, was forced to retreat, in good order, by the French force led by General Muller.

Having travelled to Madrid to request, unsuccessfully, reinforcements, on his return to the front he was faced with an even larger French force which he managed to fend off at La Rhune (26 March 1794). The following April, he launched an attack from the Valley of Baztán Valley and Roncesvalles, setting fire to over four hundred cabins and houses in Arnéguy and Ondarrola, in reprisal for the burning of Valcarlos.

In the first week of June, Muller's French troops launched attacks at Berderitz, on the mountain passes at Izpegui and Amaiur-Maya and at Roncesvalles, but was repelled and towards the end of the month, Caro made a counterattack which he was forced to suspend and then withdraw back to his lines. Returning to Madrid at the beginning of the following month to demand reinforcements, reason for which he resigned his command, being substituted by Lieutenant general Martín Álvarez de Sotomayor, the Count of Colomera.

He came out of retirement in 1801, when he was appointed captain general of Valencia. He was promoted to Captain general of the Army, Spain's highest military rank, at the end of 1802.
