= Battle of Valencia (1808) =

1808 Battle in Peninsular War

- Part of the Peninsular War
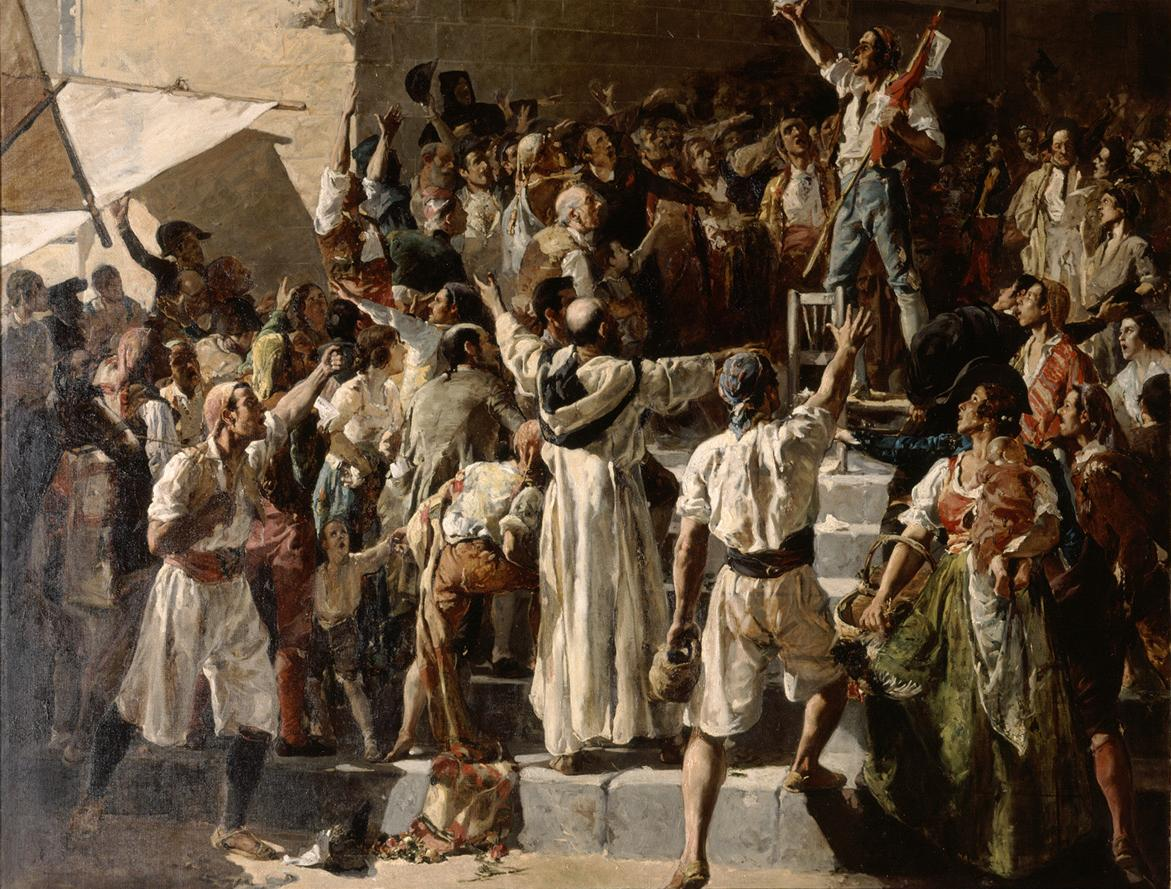
- El Crit del Palleter by Joaquín Sorolla y Bastida (1884): "Yo, Vicent Doménech, un pobre palleter, li declare la guerra a Napoleó. ¡Vixca Ferran VII i mort als traïdors!" (I, Vicent Doménech, poor baker though I be, hereby declare war on Napoleon. Long live Ferdinand VII and death to traitors!)
Date	26–28 June 1808
Location	Valencia, Spain 39°28′N 0°22′W
Result	Spanish victory

Belligerents
Spain	France

Commanders and leaders
Conde de Cervellón; Felipe Augusto de Saint-Marcq	Bon Adrien Jeannot de Moncey

Strength
1,500 regulars, 6,500 militia, 12,000 civilians	8,000–9,000 regulars

Casualties and losses
Unknown	1,100–1,200 dead or wounded

Peninsular War: Spain
current battle
Wellington in command
Wellington not in command

The First Battle of Valencia or the Storming of Valencia was an attack on the Spanish city of Valencia on 26 June 1808, early in the Peninsular War. Marshal Moncey's French Imperial troops failed to take the city by storm and retreated upon Madrid, leaving much of eastern Spain unconquered and beyond the reach of Napoleon.

== Background ==
The Spanish conventional warfare started with the Battles of El Bruch. By the summer of 1808 large parts of Spain had rebelled against the French invaders, but Napoleon believed that he was facing a series of minor insurrections. Accordingly, he ordered a number of small columns to be sent out from Madrid to deal with the rebels.

Marshal Moncey was given a column of 9,000 men to restore order in Valencia. Moncey had a choice of routes. The longer slow route led via Almansa, while the shorter quicker route cut across mountains. Moncey shared Napoleon’s belief that he was facing a local insurrection, and chose to take the quicker mountain route.

The French were faced by a much wider revolt against their occupation of Spain. The Valencian Junta had a force of 7,000 regular troops and a much larger number of levies and volunteers with which to oppose the French. The commander of the Spanish force, the Conde de Cervellon, expected Moncey to take the easier route, and so left the mountain passes almost undefended. Moncey was able to sweep aside small Spanish forces at the River Cabriel (21 June) and the Cabrillas defile (24 June), arrived outside Valencia on 24 June.

== The arrival at Valencia ==
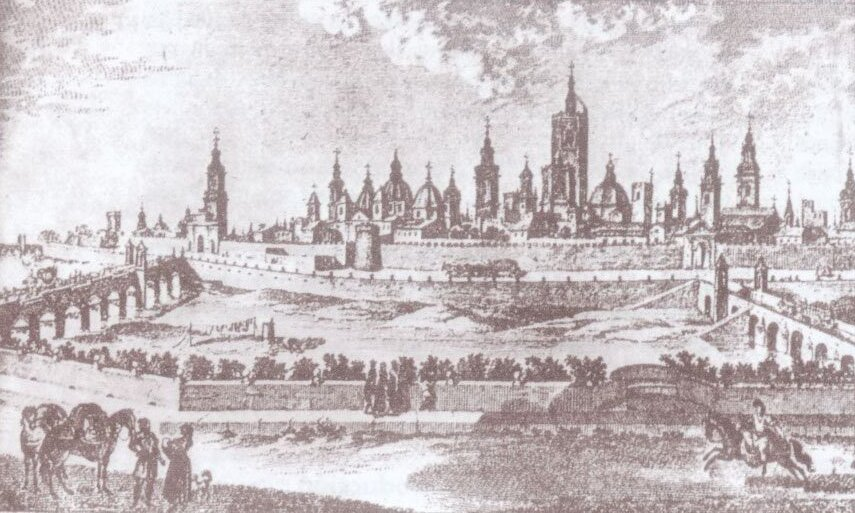
València walls: The trinquet is next to a tower and a bridge on the left

The city was not entirely undefended. Three battalions of regular troops, supported by 7,000 Valencian levies, all under the command of Don José Caro, a naval officer, were defending a position at San Onofre, four miles outside the city. Moncey was forced to spend most of 27 June fighting this force, eventually forcing it to retreat back into the city.

Valencia was not defended by modern fortifications. Instead, the city was surrounded by a wet moat and its medieval walls. However, the surrounding area was very flat, and the Spanish were able to flood it, forcing Moncey to concentrate his attack on a limited number of gates on the southern side of the city. The defenders outnumbered the French. There were around 20,000 armed men in Valencia, of whom around 1,500 were regulars and 6,500 levies with at least a little training. They also had a number of artillery guns, which were well placed to protect the gates. The gates were also protected by barricades built up over the previous few days.

Moncey was not expecting the Spanish to put up a serious fight at Valencia. On 28 June he ordered two brigades to attack the city, one against the gate of San José and one against the gate of Quarte. Both attacks failed, although the French did reach the front of the barricades. Moncey then attempted to use his field artillery to bombard the Spanish defences, but his guns were soon silenced by the Spanish guns within the city.

Moncey then ordered a second assault, this time against three gates (San José, Quarte and Santa Lucia). This attack was also beaten off, with higher casualties than the first. Moncey simply did not have enough men to capture Valencia when faced with such determined resistance. The French had not expected to be assaulting a defended city, so Moncey’s column contained no siege guns.

== Moncey's failure ==
After the failure of this second assault, Moncey realised that the situation was hopeless. He was also aware that the Spanish army that he had bypassed by crossing the mountains would be approaching. He decided to abandon the expedition to Valencia, and move back towards Madrid. This time he decided to take the Almanza road. There was always the chance that this would produce an open battle, which the French were confident they would win. In the event the Spanish moved to defend the mountain passes, believed that the French would return by their original road, and the two armies missed each other again.

== Outcome ==
Estimates of the French losses at Valencia vary wildly, from as low as 300 up to 2,000. They were probably nearer 1,100, with 800 wounded and 300 dead. Moncey’s failure in front of Valencia was the first indication that the Spanish would prove to be very determined defenders of fortified positions. It was soon overshadowed by the disastrous French defeat at Baylen on 19 July, which saw a French army under General Dupont defeated in open battle, but it played just as important a role in ending any chance of a quick French victory in Spain.

== Aftermath ==
The Spanish conventional warfare proceeded with the First siege of Zaragoza.

== See also ==
- Baltasar Calvo
- Timeline of the Peninsular War

== Notes ==
Preceded by First siege of Zaragoza	Napoleonic Wars; Battle of Valencia (1808)	Succeeded by Battle of Medina de Rioseco
