= Caro Roma =

American opera singer and composer

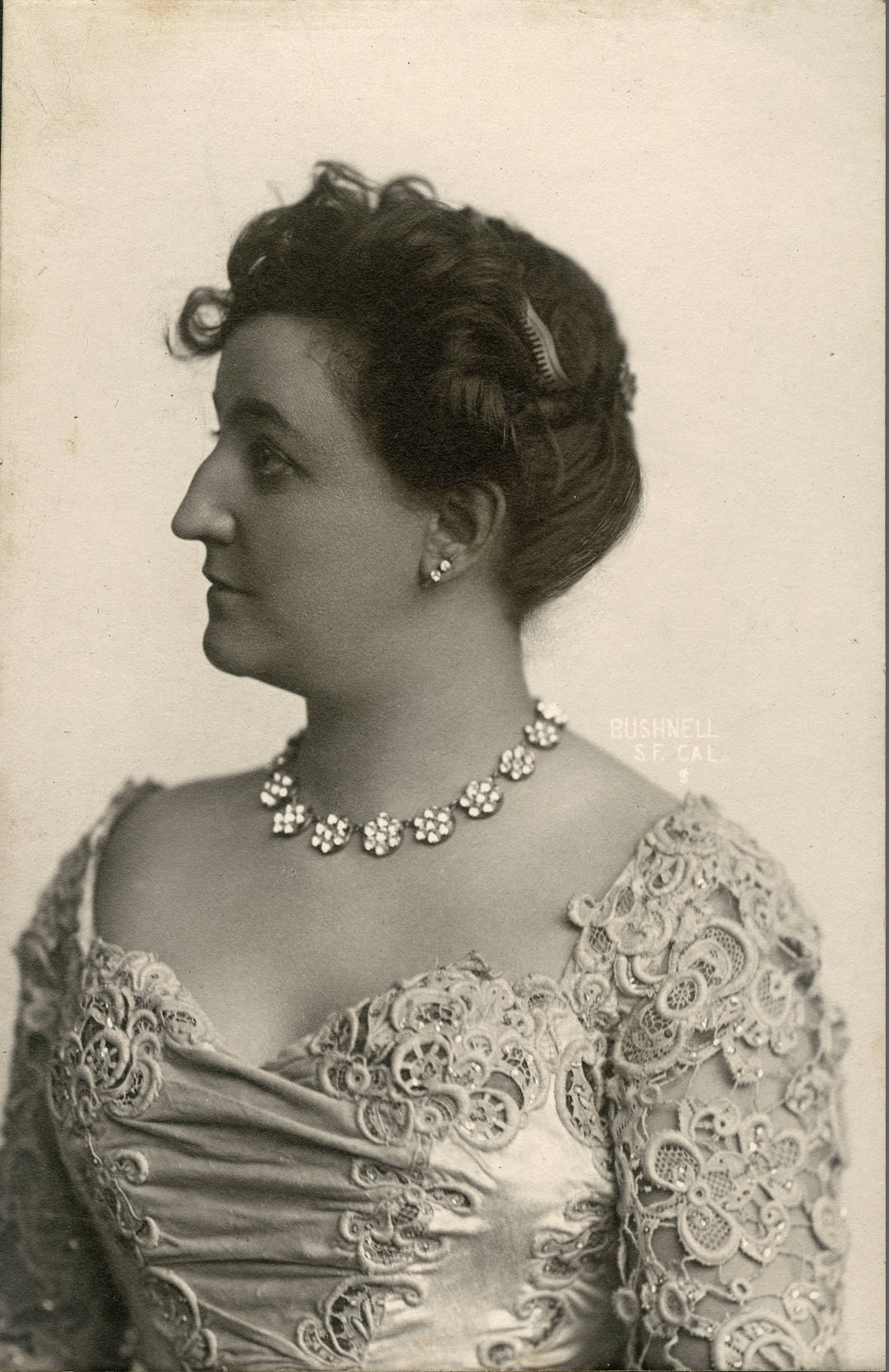
- Born: Carrie Northey; September 10, 1866; California, U.S.
- Died: September 22, 1937 (aged 71); Oakland, California, U.S.
- Occupations: Singer, songwriter

Caro Roma (September 10, 1866 – September 22, 1937) was the stage name of Carrie Northey, an American singer and composer known for Tin Pan Alley era songs.

== Early life and education ==
Carrie Northey was born in Oakland, California, the daughter of Vernal Sidney Northey, who operated a forge. She studied in Boston at the New England Conservatory of Music, graduating in 1888.

== Career ==
Northey began performing on stage at age three, and as a teenager toured in Canada as orchestra conductor for a French opera company. She became prima donna with the Henry Savage Opera Company in Boston and sang opera in the United States and in Europe, where she performed for royalty including King Edward VII. She made recordings as early as 1899. During World War I, she gave benefit concerts in New Jersey, and sang with the United States Marine Band. She toured in the American South in 1919.

Northey wrote songs and poetry as a child and developed her composition skills during her years as a performer. She sang whole recitals of her own works as early as 1909, and sang her own works in radio concerts. She received a best song award from the American National Composers' and Authors' Association in 1924. In 1932 at age 71, Northey performed nineteen of her songs at a concert in Los Angeles.

Roma married Jesse Douglas. She died after a stroke in 1937, in Oakland, at the age of 71.

== Works ==
Besides her Tin Pan Alley songs, Northey wrote poetry, sea songs, and religious works, and composed at least one song cycle. Selected works include:

- Can't Yo' Heah Me Callin' Caroline (1914)
- The Wandering One, song cycle, lyrics by Clement Scott
- Ring Out, Sweet Bells of Peace (1918, with William H. Gardner)
- Faded Rose
- The Angelus
- Thinking of Thee
- Resignation
- Lullaby

In collaboration with composer Ernest R. Ball, she also wrote the lyrics for:

- In The Garden Of My Heart
- Love Me Today
- Tomorrow May Never Come
