= Jesús Requejo San Román =

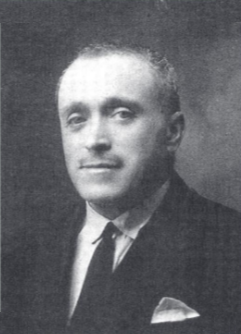
- Born: Jesús Requejo San Román; 22 February 1880; Puebla de Sanabria, Spain
- Died: 16 August 1936 (aged 56); Los Yébenes, Spain
- Occupation: property registrar
- Known for: Christian martyr
- Political party: Comunión Tradicionalista

Jesús Requejo y San Román (22 February 1880 - 16 August 1936) was a Spanish Catholic militant, theorist of society and politician; the Catholic Church declared him a martyr and a candidate for sainthood. He was locally known in the provinces of Zamora and Toledo for his activity in education, charity and agrarian syndicalism. His key work, Principios de Orientación Social, made some moderate impact among Spanish Catholic intellectuals of the mid-1930s. Politically he evolved from centre-left to extreme right: initially Requejo supported the Romanonista dynastic Liberalism, then he turned towards accidentalist Acción Católica, and finally he joined Carlism. His career climaxed in the mid-1930s; since 1934 he headed the provincial Carlist structures in Toledo and in 1936 he served as a Carlist deputy to the Cortes.

== Family and youth ==
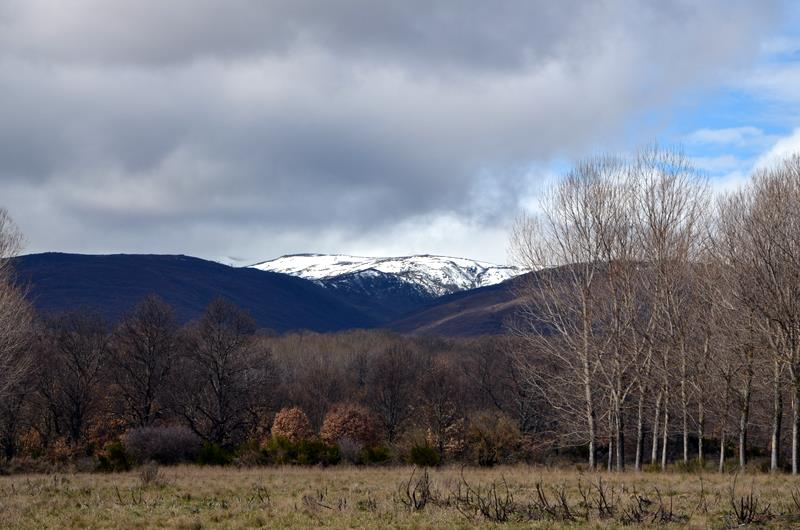
Sanabria county landscape

Since early modern era the noble family of Requejo has been related to the region of León, though for centuries none of its representatives distinguished himself in the history of Spain. Things changed in the mid-19th century, when one branch of the Requejos turned into a Liberal “oligarquía dominante” in the province of Zamora and Miguel Requejo Linares was – apart from being key taxpayer in the province – the chief Sagastino in Zamora. It is not clear how they were related to the ascendants of Jesús, yet it is confirmed that both branches remained in contact. The father of Jesús, Víctor Requejo Rodríguez, belonged to the middle class and served as a court clerk in the town of Puebla de Sanabria. He married Josefa San Román San Román; none of the sources consulted provides any closer information on her family, though many San Románs held various petty official positions in the county and were also of Liberal political preferences.

The couple lived in the village of Castro de Sanabria; they had 4 children, all of them boys: Antonio, José, Herminio and Jesús. According to some authors Jesús was the youngest one, other sources suggest otherwise. Jesús spent his early childhood of the 1880s in Castro de Sanabria. From a very young age he demonstrated religious zeal and intended to become a priest. At unspecified time he entered the local seminary in Puebla de Sanabria and then moved to another one in Astorga, where he was recorded in 1895 and 1897. He followed the courses of Humanidades, Filosofía and Teología and was reported as an excellent student. One year prior to completing the curriculum he resigned from ecclesiastic career. Eventually he obtained bachillerato with the Jesuits in Cáceres in 1900. He then enrolled at law in Valladolid and majored in 1903. Requejo continued his academic career studying derecho administrativo in Salamanca. In 1906 he obtained doctorado thanks to Repudio en Roma. Religión y Derecho Unidos, a dissertation rewarded with high grades by the jury and published afterwards.

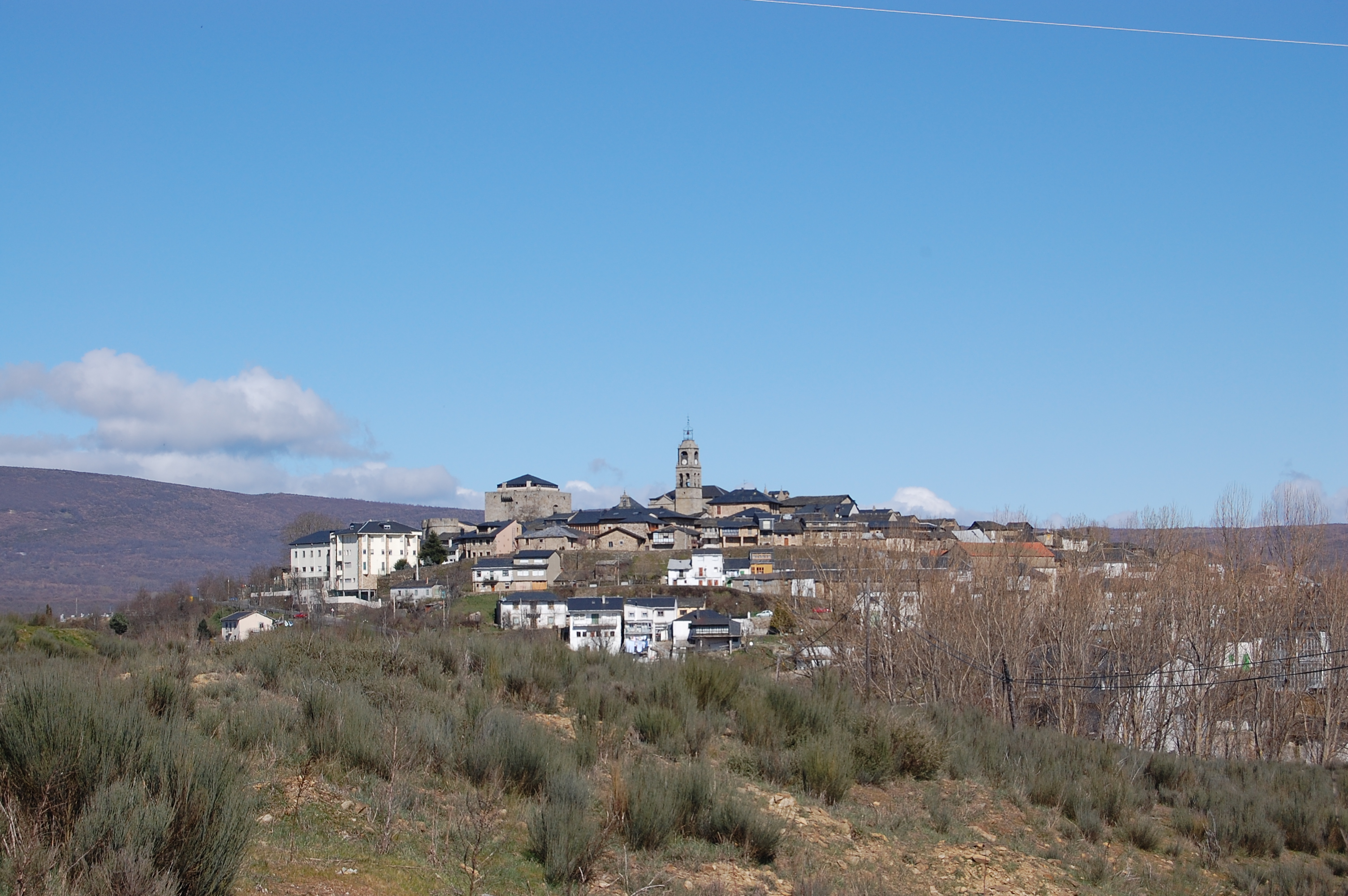
Puebla de Sanabria

In 1906 Requejo married his cousin on the maternal side, Antonia San Román San Román (1889-1977). A girl from Puebla de Sanabria, she was daughter to a local tax collector, Manuel San Román Moran. The couple settled in Puebla; it is not clear how initially they made a living, yet at least since 1908 Jesús has been noted in the press as the local Sanabrian abogado, acting as attorney at the turn of the 1900s and 1910s. Jesús and Antonia had one child, Antonio Requejo San Román (1907-1936); he graduated in law in Madrid and was preparing to pass the notary exams when soon after outbreak of the civil war he was detained and executed with his father. None of Jesús’ siblings and further relatives became a public figure; his brother Antonio was an entrepreneur, José served as fiscal and Herminio grew to high post official in mid-Francoism.

== Restoration ==
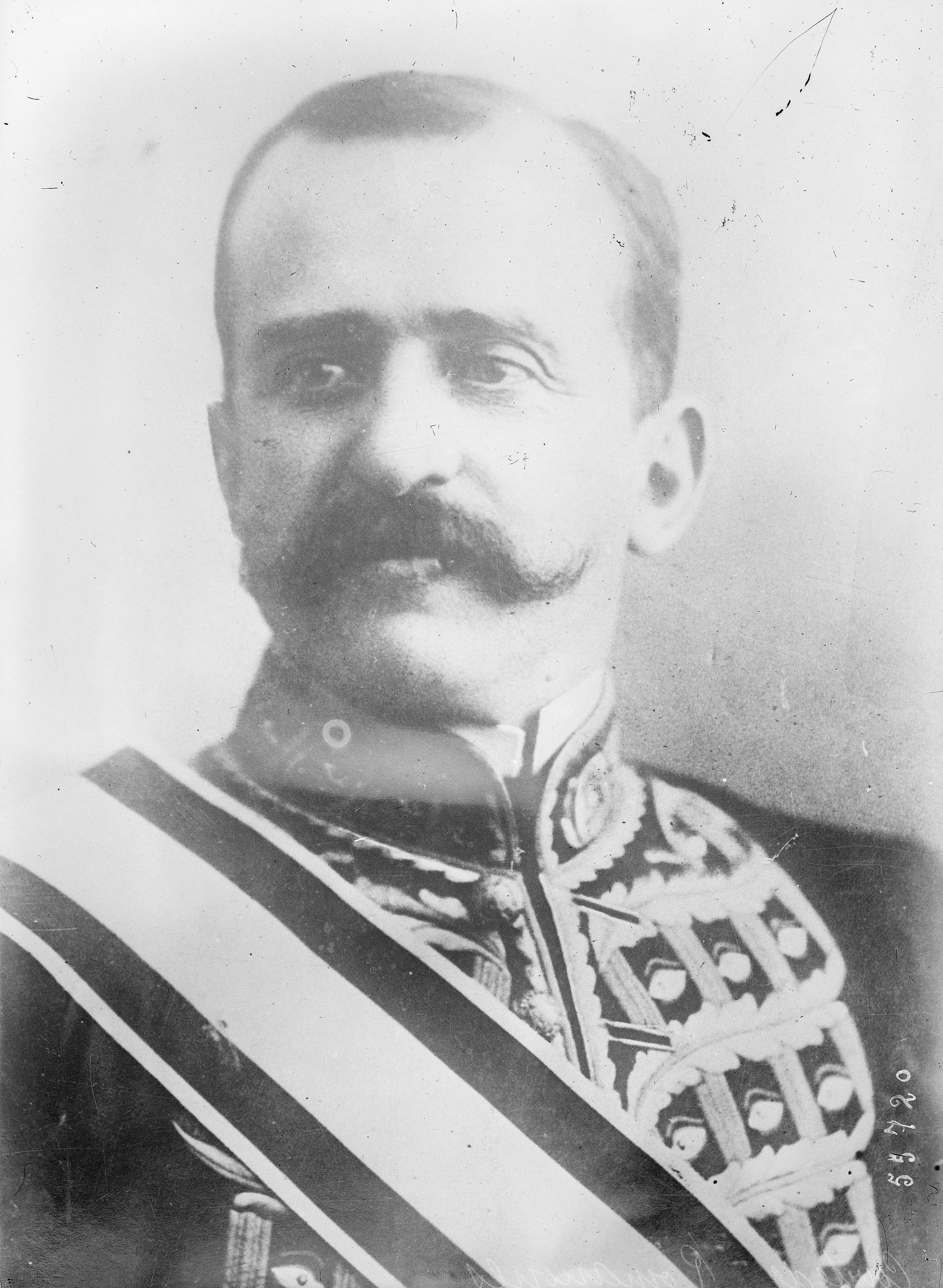
Romanones

The Requejo family was of Liberal ideas and the young Jesús initially adhered to the same political current. In the early 20th century he commenced collaboration with Heraldo de Zamora, the key liberal newspaper in the province. His first contributions identified come from 1903 and are related to electoral campaigns of Fabriciano Cid, local cacique of liberal monarchist left; following the death of Sagasta, the Requejo father and son declared themselves supporters of conde de Romanones. In the mid-1900s Jesús Requejo acted as sort of a local Sanabrian correspondent of Heraldo. His political ideas were somewhat heterodox. On the one hand, reportedly due to interest in social justice raised by the Jesuits, he lamented underprivileged position of the workers, on the 1st of May encouraged them that “querer es poder” and claimed that “their day will come”. On the other, in 1907 he formed part of Comité Conservador in the town. In 1908 he was already recognized locally, and during town feasts he spoke right after the mayor, delivering grandiloquent lectures on historical traditions of the town.

In 1909 Requejo was elected to the ayuntamiento of Puebla and proved a fairly active councillor. The same year he entered the Cuerpo de Aspirantes al Notariado and indeed soon became a notary. In 1912 – still serving as a local attorney – he passed exams to become a property registrar. In August he was posted to Bande (Orense province), but he agreed a swoop and in October 1912 he was reassigned to his native Puebla de Sanabria. Due to new duties he resigned from the town hall. In 1913 he was officially admitted to “claustro de doctores” at the University of Salamanca and since then he appeared as “doctor en derecho”. In the mid-1910s he already acted as member of the jury which examined applicants for academic teaching positions and took part in nationwide semi-scientific congresses.

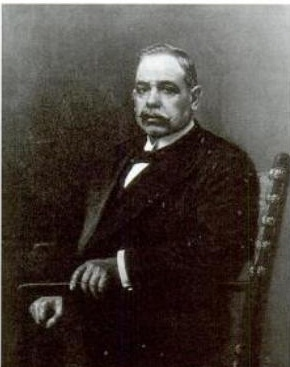
Ismael Calvo Madrono

In the late 1910s and early 1920s Requejo remained related to the liberalismo dinástico faction, active in the network of Romanonistas like Antonio Rodríguez Cid, Santiago Alba Bonifaz, Fernando López Monis or Ismael Calvo Madroño. Apart from his registrador and attorney jobs he was increasingly engaged in social initiatives. In 1915 he co-founded Sindicato Agrícola Católico Sanabrés and engaged in Federación Agraria Católica of Zamora. In 1916 he worked to ensure cheap credit by co-founding a local Banco Agrícola and started to discuss agrarian policy in specialized Madrid periodicals. In 1917 he raised support for Liberal educational initiatives; in 1918 he briefly served in Madrid as “secretario particular de la subsecretaria”; he worked on a public education project, sponsored by López Monis. In Puebla Requejo founded a dormitory for the poor and tried to set up a secondary school; in 1920 he donated 5,000 ptas for a future educational institution in the town and funded grants for aspiring young teenagers from poor families. In the early 1920s he was a well-recognized county personality, active in numerous bodies and assuming prestigious roles during local events.

== Dictatorship ==
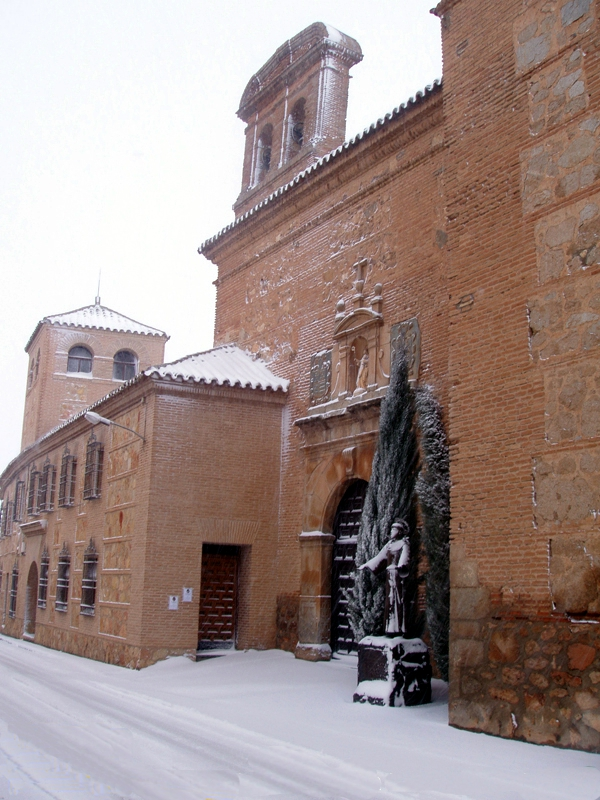
Madridejos

As a property registrar in 1924 Requejo was reassigned to the town of Madridejos (Toledo province); at the time he was already an expert in real estate law and occasionally published in scientific periodicals. In Madridejos he resumed his trademark activities: charity and education. He donated money to various projects supposed to help the poor, funded scholarship grants for children and co-ordinated campaigns contributing to local culture. Banking on the 1926 secondary educational reform of Eduardo Callejo, Requejo launched the project of setting up a college in Madridejos and remained its moving spirit; the initiative was crowned with success in 1928, when Instituto Elemental de Madridejos became the second institute offering bachillerato education in the province.

Though Requejo's public activity in Puebla de Sanabria was only moderately marked by Catholic flavor, in Madridejos it was increasingly formatted along religious lines. He paid for sacerdotal education of a number of seminarians from Madridejos, and some – including teenagers of African origin - indeed would later become priests. The couple engaged in Conferencia de San Vicente de Paúl and apart from various minor projects worked to set up a college for girls intending to enter religious orders. He donated royalties from Tierra Santa y Roma (1927), a book which provided account of his voyages, to Obra Pontificia de San Pedro Apóstol. In 1930 together with his wife they became godparents of José Luis Martin Descalzo, a local boy who would later gain name nationwide as a writer, publisher and priest. His zeal assumed a militant tone when he focused apostolic and missionary activities on the nearby town of Camuñas, a Manchegan centre of Protestantism known as “Spanish Geneva”; Requejo worked with the local parish to contain and possibly reduce its Protestant influence. In 1930 he was vice-president of a committee to erect monument to the Heart of Jesus in Toledo and took part in Congreso Mariano in Madrid.

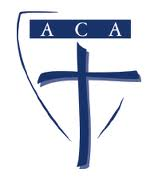
present AC logotype

In the late 1920s Requejo gained in Madridejos the prestige he used to enjoy in Puebla de Sanabria, appreciated as a person who believed that education brings progress and the one who did his best to help the community he lived in. Due to his activities he gradually came to be known as the local “paladín de la cultura”. However, none of the sources consulted confirms Requejo's engagement in politics; he is not recorded as member of Unión Patriótica, Somatén or any other primoderiverista structures. After the fall of Primo he wholeheartedly engaged in Acción Católica; not only he attended its first National Congress of 1930 but remained on close terms with Herrera Oría and with cardenal Segura. Moreover, he prepared Notas para un ensayo de reorganización de la Acción Católica Española, a pamphlet which recommended new organisation of AC and in a competent, somewhat technocratic style dwelled on suggested main threads of its activity. Engagement in central AC structures soon became sort of his second job, especially that in the early 1930s Requejo was living partially in Madridejos and partially in Madrid.

== Republic ==
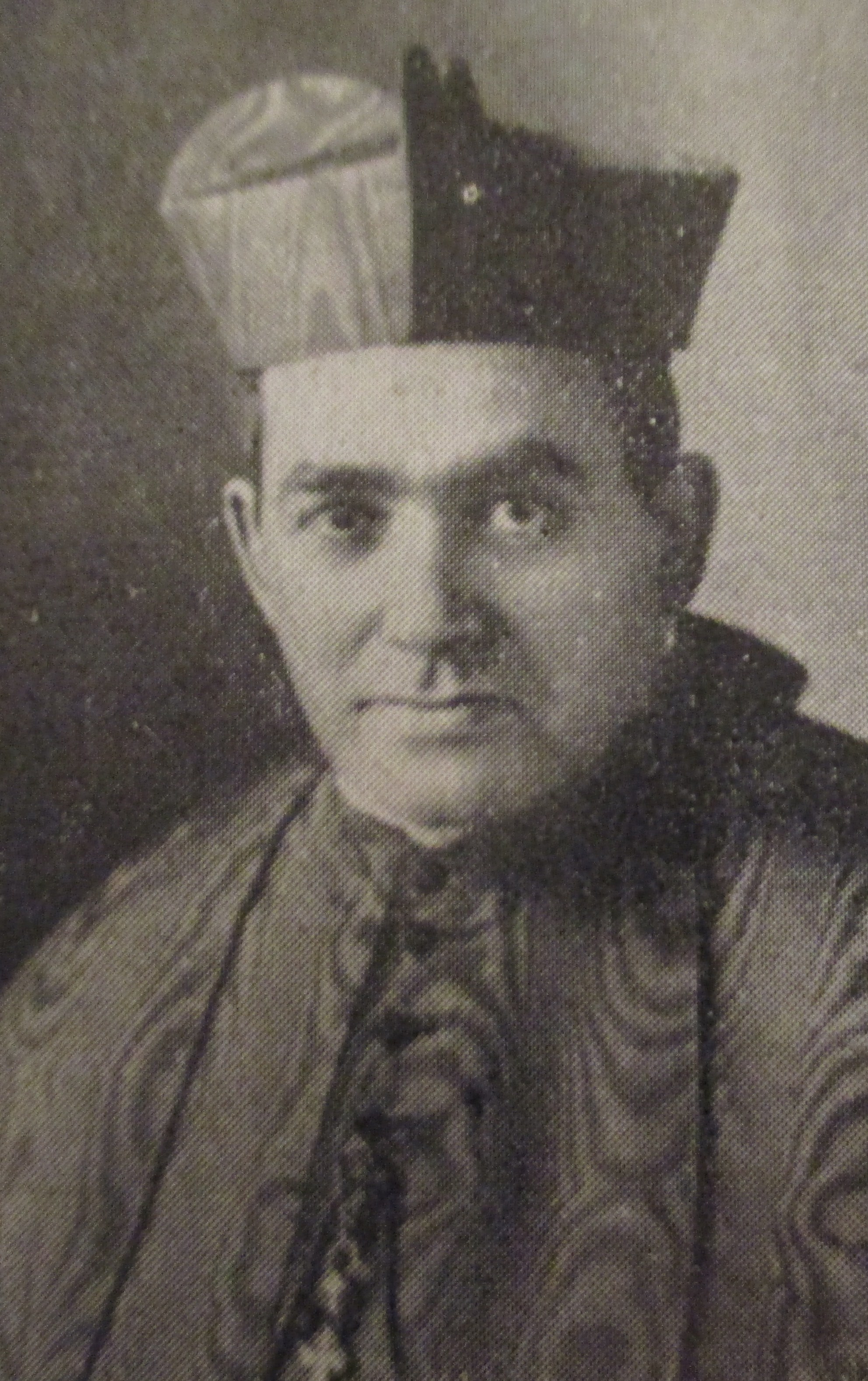
cardenal Segura

It is not clear whether Requejo cheered or regretted the fall of the monarchy; his earlier publications, public addresses or engagement in Acción Católica suggest rather some sort of accidentalism. In 1931 he remained active in Cruz Roja and Federación de Amigos de Enseñanza, both perfectly compatible with liberal spirit of the early Republic. In 1932, however, he started to oppose the official policy; as vice-president of Confederación de Padres de Familia he protested forced secularization of schools and voiced in favor of parents rising children the way they liked. As acting president of Asociación de Familias y Amigos de Religiosos he spoke in defense of conventual property, targeted by new religious legislation; in the press Requejo published a series of related articles, calling for “oración, propaganda, cooperación económica”. He also engaged in Catholic agrarian sindicates.

In 1932 Requejo published El Cardenal Segura, the first biography of the primate; prologued by Ramiro de Maeztu, the 215-page work assumed a decisively hagiographic tone. It was welcome by the Catholic press and proved a market success, with re-run issued shortly. Moreover, given Segura had been expelled from Spain by the new Republican authorities, the book sounded like Requejo's political declaration. Confirmation of his new militant line came with publication of Las fuerzas secretas de la revolución (1932), Requejo's translation from Léon de Poncins, and with his own De la Revolución española. Los Jesuitas (1932), prologued by Herrera Oria; both pamphlets denounced militantly secular policy as driven by anti-Church conspiracy and declared expulsion of religious orders, especially Jesuits, part of this plot. His cultural campaign climaxed in Principios de Orientación Social (1933), a collection of essays on state, church, society, and individual rights. Called “catecismo social Cristiano”, by Catholic press the book was applauded as a treaty on Christianity in modern world. A number of minor works followed.

Carlist standard

Requejo turned even further Right and in the early 1930s he approached Carlism. In January 1934 he was nominated head of Comunión Tradicionalista in the province of Toledo and engaged in some Traditionalist initiatives. He published an article which declared democracy and parliamentarism on the brink of death; noting that some countries had already done away with it, he claimed that Spain would soon follow suit and replace unworkable, individualistic universal suffrage with organic democracy. In 1935 the Carlist political leader Manuel Fal Conde nominated Requejo to Junta de Hacienda, a central body supposed to manage economic issues of CT. During the 1936 electoral campaign Requejo as a Traditionalist candidate joined local right-wing alliance named Bloque Antirevolucionario and was comfortably elected. In the Cortes he entered commissions of Budget, Justice and Public Education, but he took to the floor also during plenary sessions. Requejo championed Catholic rights to publicly profess their faith and protested Popular Front designs against religious orders and conventual education; he was last recorded speaking on July 8. Some scholars claim that parliamentary clashes with left-wing personalities gained attention of the press, which would ultimately seal his fate.

== Martyrdom ==
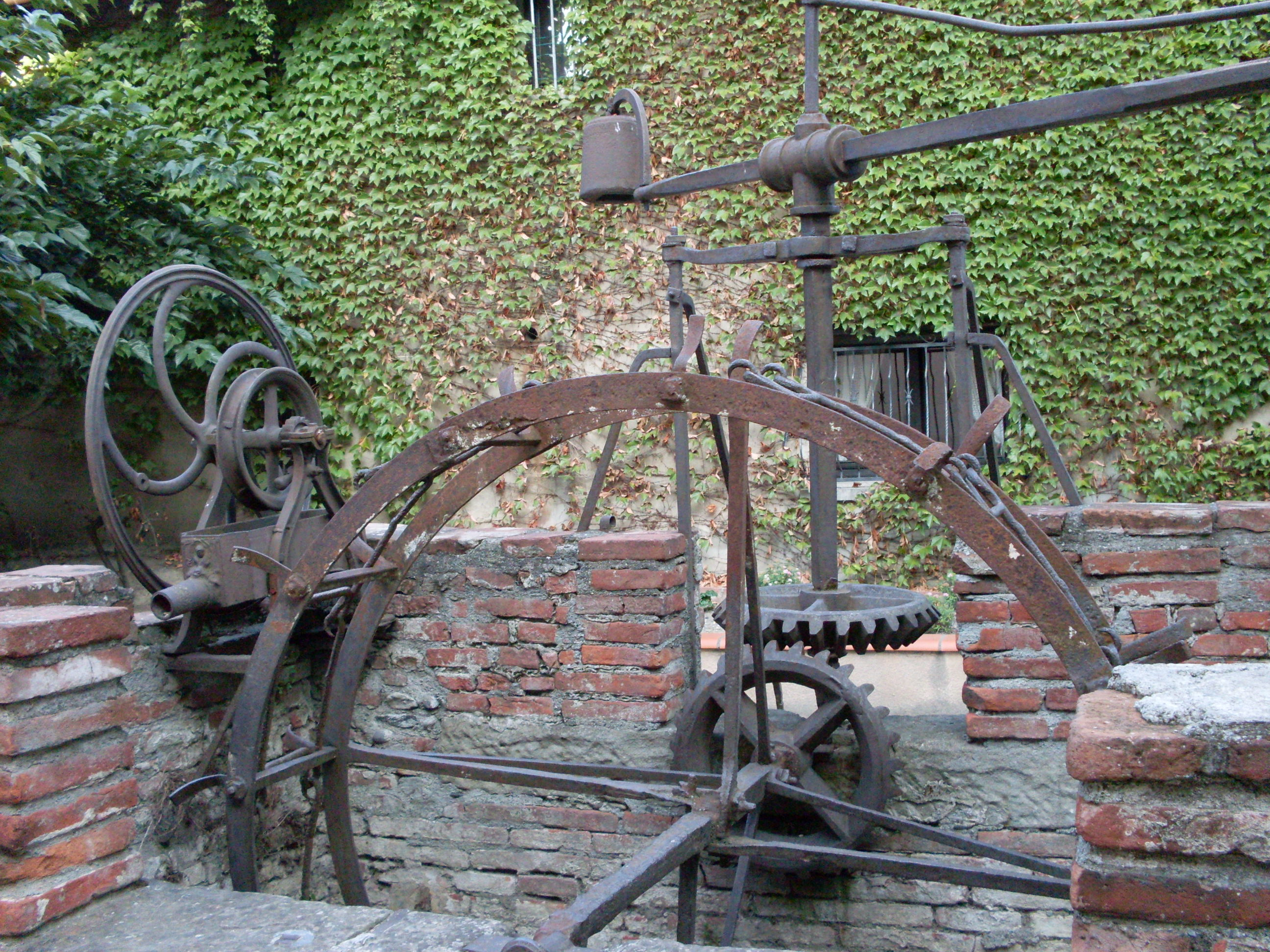
noria (example)

It is not clear whether Requejo took part in Carlist conspiracy against the Republic; some sources maintain he participated in the plot, but a RAH historian claims otherwise. On July 18 Requejo was with his wife and son in Madridejos, reportedly preparing to travel to Puebla de Sanabria to commence summer holidays. According to some accounts Requejo could have easily gone into hiding or escaped abroad, but as he considered himself a just man who harmed no-one and worked for common good he saw no reason to flee and declined a related offer. However, in late July both Requejo and his son were detained by local militia and placed in a Franciscan convent, turned into a makeshift prison. For some 3 weeks his wife was permitted to bring them food; some authors claim they were beaten and tortured. In mid-August the Requejos were extracted from prison and transported towards Toledo, but their journey ended in Los Yébenes. First they were tied to a noria wheel, operating in the Algodor river; then they had their hands cut off. While being shot the Requejos cried "¡Viva Cristo Rey!" They were buried in a common grave.

Following the Nationalist triumph in the Civil War Requejo and his son were referred to in the Francoist press as martyrs for God and the Fatherland, but their names soon went into oblivion. None of the sources consulted clarifies whether individuals responsible for Requejo's death have been identified. The widow re-buried her husband and son in the Madridejos church; she donated substantial sums to set up a seminary in the town, but the plan has ultimately ended in failure. The Instituto that Requejo helped to set up developed into Instituto Garcilaso de la Vega and provides education until today. A school for girls that Requejo tried to launch materialized thanks to donations of Fundación Pérez-Moreno and works as Colegio Amor de Dios de Madridejos, operated by Hermanas del Amor de Dios.

In the early 21st century the Toledo archbishopric office started to collect data which might lead towards canonization of Catholics killed in the diocese during the Civil War; both Jesús Requejo and Antonio Requejo were among these investigated. The so-called Causa Toletana cause, which covers 464 names, was brought formally before the Vatican Congregation for the Causes of Saints, which in 2003 declared all these listed – including the Requejos – Servants of God. The step, which acknowledged their martyrdom, formally commenced the canonization process; it is still ongoing. Local press in Zamora few times mentioned Requejo as a would-be saint. Requejo gained no major monograph; so far he was dedicated 3 smaller pieces. There is plaza commemorating him in Madridejos. A cross erected in 1956 to commemorate these executed near Los Yébenes still stands by the CM-4205 road. Another cross stands in the centre of the town; it used to commemorate 180 victims of Republican terror in Los Yébenes, but in 2017 the plaque was changed and now it records “all fallen during the Civil War”.

== See also ==
- Carlism
- Traditionalism (Spain)
