= Esperanza Elena Caro =

Spanish embroiderer

Esperanza Elena Caro (1906–1985) was a Spanish embroiderer from Seville. She is remembered for the many richly embroidered religious works she created, especially those created after she took over the family workshop in 1943. Prominent works include the embroidered mantles and insignia she created over the years for the Virgen de Madre de Dios de la Palma and the Esperanza de Triana in connection with the Holy Week processions in the city. In 1971, she was honoured with the Gold Medal of Labour.

== Early life ==
Born in La Campana, Province of Seville, on 4 September 1906, Esperanza Elena Caro was the daughter of Manuel Elena and Concepción Caro. After attending school in the Franciscan convent of Santa María del Socorro, she learnt all the skills of embroidery from her aunt Victoria who in 1917 had established a studio with her brother José Caro Márquez.

== Career ==
As early as 1924, Elena Caro acquired increasing responsibility for the family workshop, she created the embroidered decorations for the canopy of the Hermandad de Monte-Sion, but the work was lost during the Spanish Civil War. In 1940, Elena Caro created one of her earlier works, the insignia of Esperanza Macarena, embroidering gold and coloured silks on red and green velvet. In the mid-1940s, she and her workshop colleagues embroidered a mantle designed by José Recio as well as the canopy for the Virgen de las Aguas del Museo which included a depiction of the Assumption in coloured silks.

Elena Caro went on to embroider attire for the Virgen de la Macarena (skirt 1937, mantle and Coronation cloak, 1964, also insignia), and various cloaks for the Virgen de Madre de Dios de la Palma and for Esperanza de Triana (from 1948 to 1994).

Esperanza Elena Caro died in Seville on 6 March 1985.

== Awards ==
In May 1964, Elena Caro received the Medal of Seville (bronze) and in 1971 she was honoured with the Gold Medal of Labour. In 1986, a passage in Seville was named Esperanza Elena Caro in her honour.
