= Juan Caro Sureda =

Spanish army officer (1775–1820)

Juan Caro
- Born: 5 April 1775; Palma de Mallorca, Balearic Islands
- Died: 25 December 1826 (aged 51) Alcalá de Henares, Madrid
- Conflicts: War of the Pyrenees; Peninsular War; Battle of Villafranca; Battle of Vic

Juan Caro Sureda (1775–1826) (Note: Although his biography at Real Academia de la Historia (see Isabel Sánchez, below) gives 1820 as his date of death, the same source refers to him as captain general of Catalonia from 1825 to 1826. The date of death is probably the latter.) was a Spanish military commander, the younger brother of Pedro Caro y Sureda, Marquis of La Romana, and José Caro Sureda.

== Early career ==
Enlisting as a cadet in the Infantry Regiment of Cantabria in 1787, in 1790 he transferred to the Soria Regiment and was promoted to lieutenant.

In 1793 he participated in the War of the Pyrenees as aide-de-camp to General Ventura Caro, his uncle.

In 1794 he was promoted to captain of the Regiment of Valencia Volunteers and in 1798 he was attached to the Regiment of Spanish Hussars. The following year, he went to Mahón, under the orders of his elder brother, the Marquis of La Romana, and in 1807 went with him as part of the Division of the North, and returning to Spain at the outbreak of the Peninsular War.

== Peninsular War ==
In October 1808 he was promoted to brigadier and given the command of the Cavalry of the Army of the Left, as well as that Army's vanguard and command of the guerrilla forced attached to it.

In 1809, he saw action at the Battle of Lugo (May 1809) under Mendizábal, and on 22 May, at the head of 200 horsemen, attacked a French force twice the size of his own. He then transferred to the Army of Catalonia.

General Henry O'Donnell, who had installed himself at Tarragona and had strengthened its garrison with 6,000 men, sent Caro to attack Villafranca and Manresa. At Villafranca, Caro captured the 800 French soldiers posted there. Wounded, he had to hand over his command to Campoverde. He then saw further action at Vic.

In August 1810 he was one of the senior officers that forced his older brother, José Caro Sureda, the despotic captain general of Valencia, to resign his command and flee to Mallorca.

He was given command of the Cavalry of the 2nd Army and after resisting the French attack at Alcalà de Xivert, he returned to the Army of Catalonia and was appointed commander-in-chief of the 7,000-strong garrison at Tarragona, the only stronghold still under Spanish control in Catalonia. In May, he was relieved of his command by Juan de Contreras, and the place was besieged and finally fell, at the end of June.

Appointed military governor of Valencia, the following October he was given command of the Cavalry of Blake's Army of Valencia at the Battle of Saguntum, where he was wounded, taken prisoner and sent to France for the remainder of the war.

== Post-war career ==
On his return to Spain, he was appointed military governor of the Citadel of Barcelona in June 1814, and in May 1815 he was promoted to lieutenant general. In September 1819 he was appointed military governor of Málaga, post from which he was dismissed the following year and confined to barracks. He was captain general of Catalonia from 1825 to 1826.
