= Abraham ben Raphael Caro =

Abraham ben Raphael Caro was an Ottoman rabbi. He flourished at Adrianople in the first half of the eighteenth century. He was a descendant of Rabbi Joseph Karo, and was the stepson and pupil of Rabbi Eliezer ben Jacob Nachum, author of Chazon Nachum (Constantinople, 1743–45), whom he probably succeeded as rabbi of Adrianople. Several treatises written by Rabbi Abraham Caro and quotations from others of his works, none of which was published separately, are to be found in his stepfather's work. Abraham Caro died young.
