= José Caro Sureda =

Spanish army officer (1764–1813)

- Born: 4 July 1764; Palma de Mallorca, Balearic Islands
- Died: 1813 (aged 48–49) Palma de Mallorca
- Conflicts: Napoleonic Wars; Trafalgar campaign; Battle of Diamond Rock; Peninsular War; Battle of Valencia; Battle of Tudela

José Caro Sureda (1764–1813) was a Spanish military commander, the younger brother of Pedro Caro Sureda, 3rd Marquis of La Romana.

His younger brother, Juan Caro Sureda (1775–1820), was also a military commander during the Peninsular War.

== Early career ==
At the start of the Anglo-Spanish War, José Caro was given command of the Magdalena that sailed from Cádiz in April 1805 as part of the Spanish squadron led by Federico Gravina, headed for Martinique where, at the Battle of Diamond Rock, a large combined Franco-Spanish fleet (Note: The commander of the French fleet was Pierre de Villeneuve.) was able to oust the British garrison the following month.

== Peninsular War ==
Promoted to brigadier, with his 2,000-strong column of the newly raised Regiment of Cazadores de Valencia, he was able to help repel Moncey's two successive attacks on the city.

As captain general of Valencia, Caro was later able to repel Marshal Suchet's attack on Valencia (7 March 1810), forcing the French general to withdraw to Catalonia, and for which Caro was promoted to lieutenant general the following May.

Eventually forced to flee to Mallorca, he was replaced as captain general of Valencia by Field Marshal Luis Alejandro Bassecourt in August 1810.
