= Battle of Villafranca (1809) =

1809 Battle of the Peninsular War

Battle of Villafranca del Bierzo
- Part of the Peninsular War
- Battle of Villafranca (1809) (Spain)
Date	17 March 1809
Location	Near Villafranca del Bierzo, Spain 42°36′N 6°49′W
Result	Spanish victory

Belligerents
(France) French Empire	Spain

Commanders and leaders
(France) unknown	(Spain) General La Romana

Strength
1,200	3,800–6,000; 6 guns

Casualties and losses
700 killed 575 captured	Unknown

Peninsular War: Second French invasion
current battle

The Battle of Villafranca del Bierzo took place on 17 March 1809, during the French occupation of León in the Peninsular War. After a bloody four-hour siege the small and isolated French garrison at Villafranca surrendered to Spanish regulars under Brigadier José de Mendizábal and General Pedro Caro, 3rd Marquis of la Romana.

== Background ==
In 1809 Spanish military operations in northern Spain were marked by sporadic efforts to expel Marshal Ney's French VI Corps from the provinces it had overrun following the collapse of the Spanish armies the previous year. Fragments of the armies torn-apart by the French, operating in conjunction with some 30,000 guerrillas and militia, prowled the coasts of Galicia and Asturias, raiding and skirmishing with Ney's 17,000 troops. Garrisoning the hostile region ate up most of Ney's resources, and in March 1809, the French evacuated Vigo and Tuy and withdrew from guerrilla-infested southern Galicia.

One remaining Spanish formation, General Pedro Caro, 3rd Marquis of la Romana's division of regular infantry, established itself in Asturias and harassed the French in León and Galicia, capturing Imperial troops and supplies with impunity. In March, elements of the unit, armed with a French 12-pound gun and munitions recovered from an abandoned post at Ponferrada, struck at French communications with Madrid by attacking the French post at Villafranca.

== The battle ==
The vanguard of the attack was formed of some 1,500 men of the Zaragoza and Zamora regiments under Mendizábal. On the 17 March they entered the plaza at Villafranca and closed in on the French entrenched in the castle. A costly battle broke out that claimed the lives of several Spanish officers. After four hours of fighting the French agreed to surrender.

One authority credited General La Romana with 3,800 Spanish troops and six artillery pieces. This force included two battalions each of the Princesa and Asturias Infantry Regiments. The 1,200-man French force included one battalion of the 6th Light Infantry Regiment plus several hundred sick and wounded soldiers. The French lost 700 killed and wounded plus another 574 unwounded men captured. Spanish losses are not known. A second historian wrote that the Spanish had 6,000 men.

== See also ==
- Timeline of the Peninsular War

== Bibliography ==
- Esdaile, Charles J. (2003). The Peninsular War. Palgrave MacMillan. ISBN 978-1-4039-6231-7.
- Gates, David (2001). The Spanish Ulcer: A History of the Peninsular War. Da Capo Press. ISBN 0-306-81083-2.
- Smith, Digby (1998). The Napoleonic Wars Data Book. London: Greenhill. ISBN 1-85367-276-9.

Preceded by Tyrolean Rebellion	Napoleonic Wars; Battle of Villafranca (1809)	Succeeded by Battle of Los Yébenes
