= Pedro Caro Sureda, 3rd Marquis of La Romana =

Spanish army officer and noble

The Marquis of La Romana
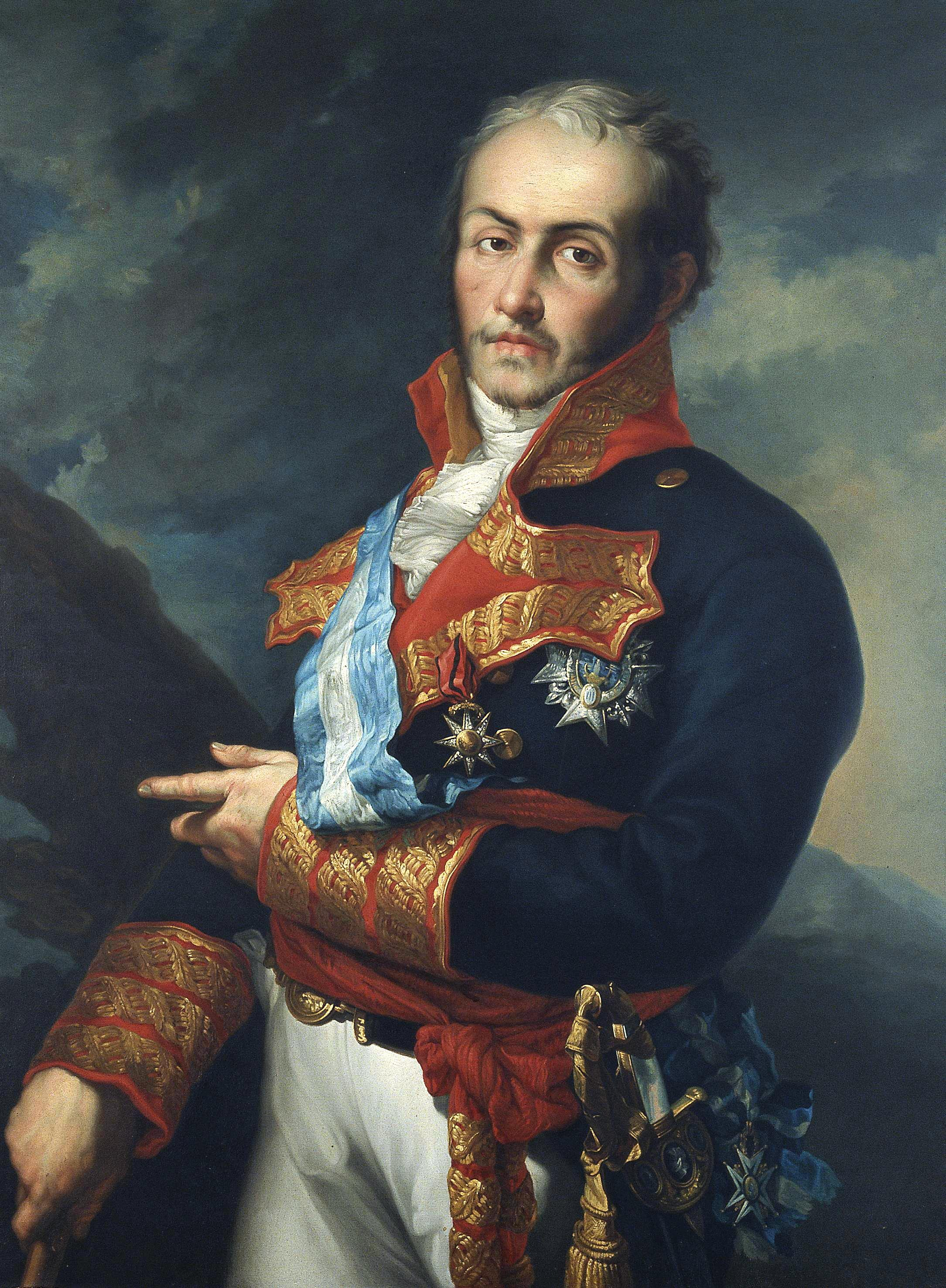
- Portrait by Eduardo Carrió, c. 1878 (Note: This portrait, by Eduardo Carrió, is a copy (c. 1878) of an original by Vicente López (c. 1815). As La Romana died in 1811, López's portrait must have been painted from an effigy. (Museo del Prado.))
- Born: 2 October 1761; Palma de Mallorca
- Died: 23 January 1811 (aged 49) Cartaxo, Portugal
- Allegiance: Spain
- Conflicts: Peninsular War

Pedro Caro Sureda, 3rd Marquis of La Romana (2 October 1761 – 23 January 1811) was a Spanish Army officer and nobleman who served in the French Revolutionary and Napoleonic Wars. His two younger brothers, José Caro Sureda, and Juan Caro Sureda also served in the Spanish army during the Peninsular War.

== Biography ==
=== Early career ===
Born at Palma de Mallorca to a family of Balearic nobility, La Romana was educated in Lyon, France. His education was classical; he read Greek and Latin, as well as speaking French and English. He entered the Seminario de Nobles in Madrid and later studied at the University of Salamanca.

Like many Spanish officers of the Napoleonic Wars, La Romana served in the American Revolutionary War in his youth. After entering the military academy in 1775, he reached the rank of frigate captain in 1791. He saw action at Minorca (1781) and at Gibraltar (1782).

In 1793, La Romana transferred to the Infantry Regiment "Inmemorial del Rey" No. 1, serving under his uncle, General Ventura Caro. He saw action in the War of the Pyrenees, part of the War of the First Coalition, and was promoted to field marshal in 1794.

He then transferred to the Army of Catalonia, serving first under the orders of Luis Firmín de Carvajal, Conde de la Unión and, following Carvajal's death at Black Mountain (1794), under Urrutia.

Following the signing of the Peace of Basel (1795) he was promoted to lieutenant general for his services during that campaign. In 1800 he was appointed Captain General of Catalonia.

King Charles IV, bullied and pressured by Napoleon, agreed in 1807 to provide a veteran infantry division to bolster the Grande Armée in Germany. La Romana was given command of this Division of the North and spent 1807 and 1808 performing garrison duties in Hamburg and later Denmark under Marshal Bernadotte.

=== Peninsular War ===
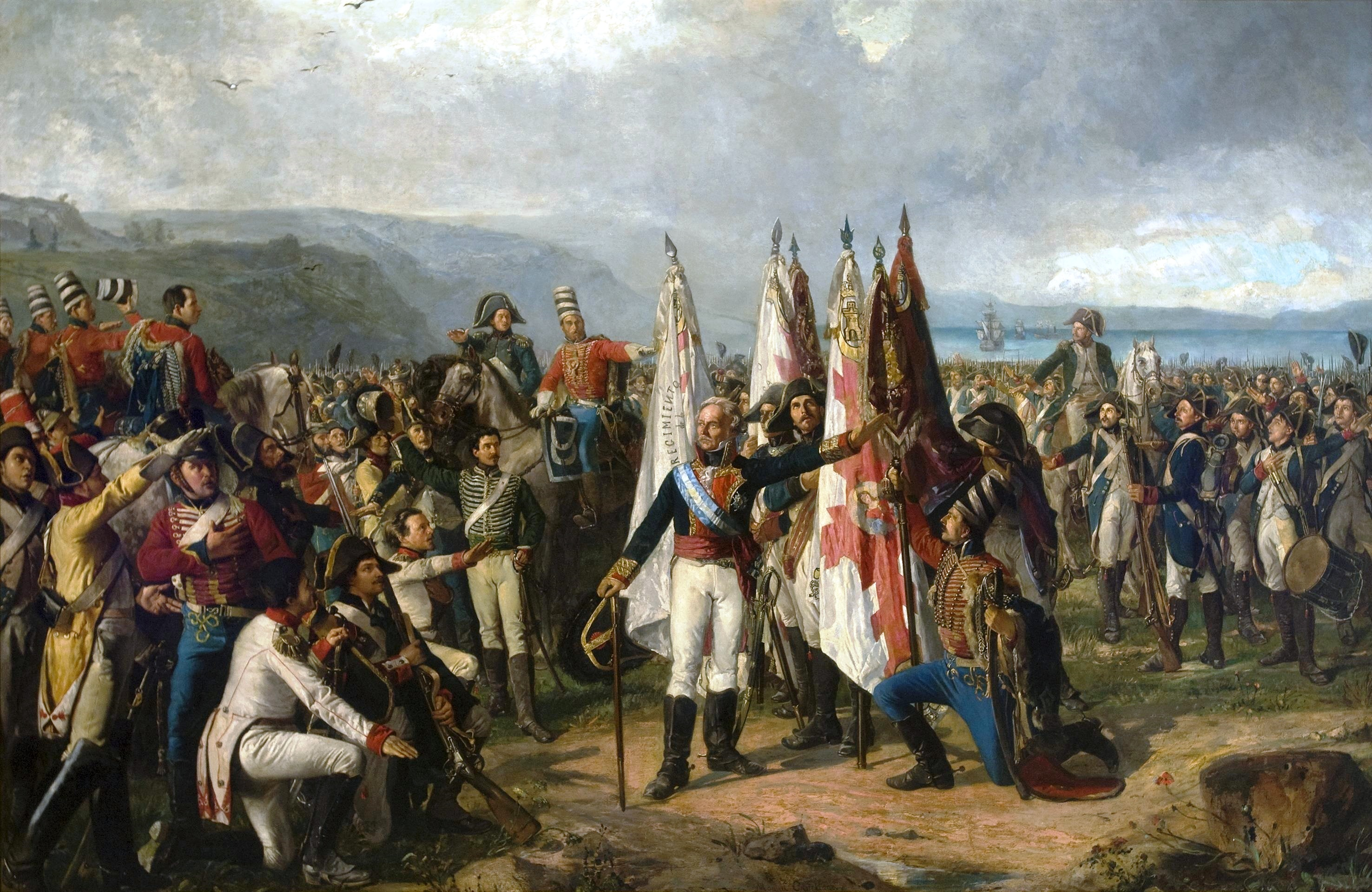
General Romana (centre) with the Spanish Division of the North, sent to Denmark to fight against the British, pledging to turn against France and side with Britain, 1808. Oil painting by Manuel Castellano (c. 1870), Museo del Prado.

When the Peninsular War broke out, La Romana was approached by the British who offered to evacuate his men to Spain. At least 9,000 men of the 15,000-strong division were able to board Royal Navy ships on 27 August and return to Spain. Their defection reduced Bernadotte's Hanseatic Army to a string of glorified coastal garrisons, severely sapping Napoleon's left (north) wing in the contest with Austria for mastery over central Europe in 1809.

La Romana arrived at Santander on the Cantabrian front and received command of the Army of Galicia on 11 November. This army, under General Blake, suffered heavy losses at the Battle of Espinosa that same day. With this force, La Romana fought some rearguard actions for General John Moore's retreat westwards to Corunna. Using his limited means, La Romana conducted small-scale attacks against the French in 1809. These met with success and his men were able to distract the French and overwhelm isolated garrisons such as Villafranca. Following the French defeat at Puente Sanpayo on 6 June, Marshal Soult abandoned his attempts to reestablish French rule in Galicia. When Soult moved against the British on the Portuguese frontier, La Romana drove the French from Asturias as well.

La Romana was appointed to the Central Junta on 29 August and served until 1810. He then returned to military operations under Wellington but died suddenly on 23 January 1811 while preparing the relief of Badajoz. With Castaños, La Romana was the Spanish general most trusted and respected by Wellington. At the news of his death, Wellington wrote, "his loss is the greatest which the cause could sustain."

== Gallery ==
The Marquis of La Romana owned eleven paintings by Goya, of which nine have survived.

Paintings by Goya in the La Romana Collection
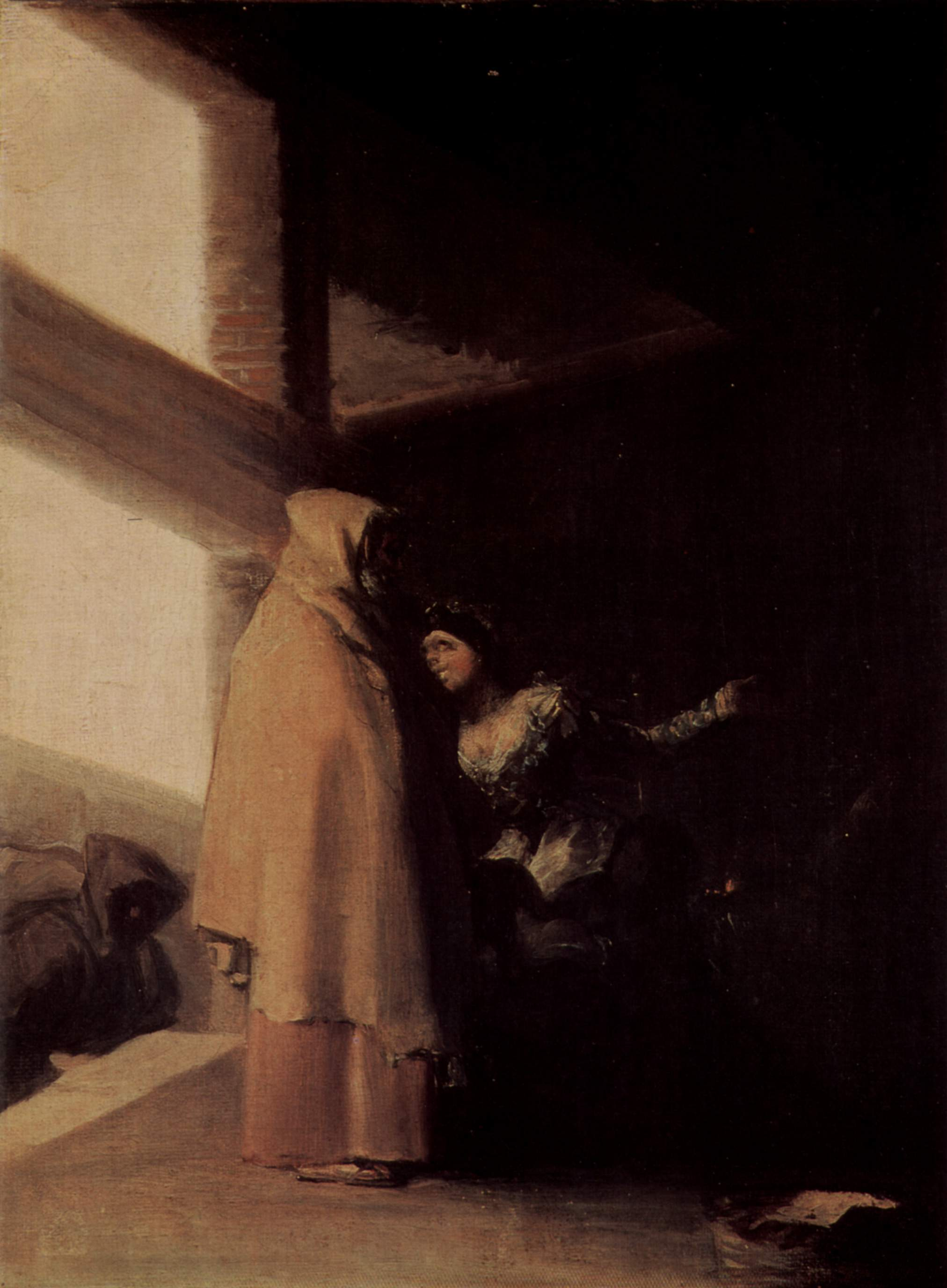
The Visit of the Friar (1808–1810)

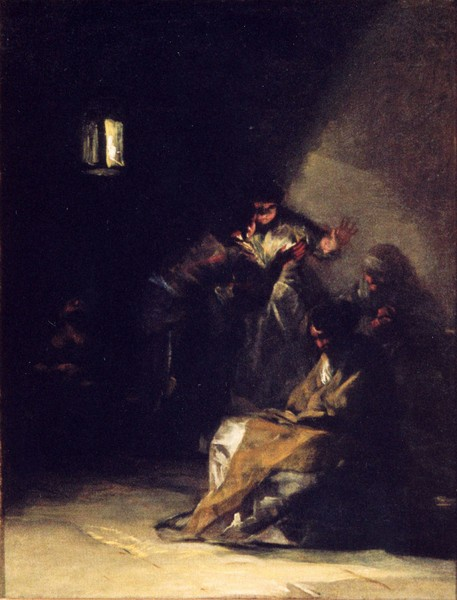
Interior of a prison (1808–1812)

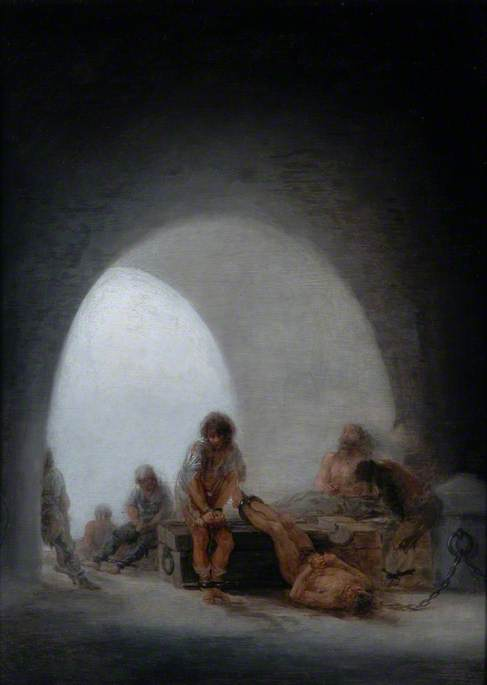
Interior of a prison (1793)

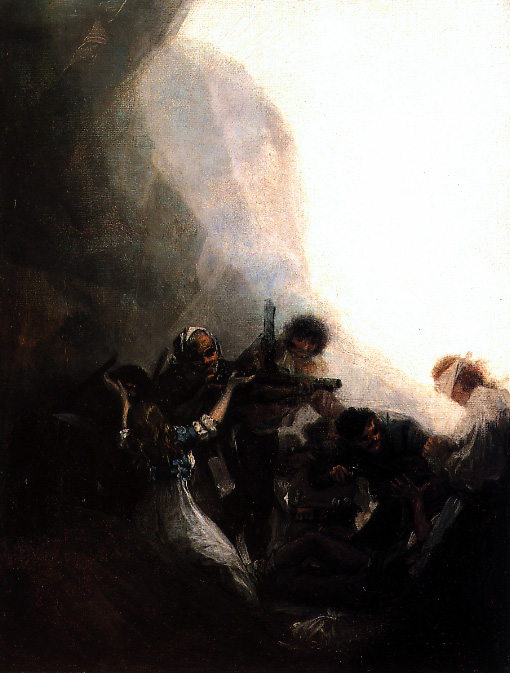
Bandits shooting their prisoners (1808–1812)

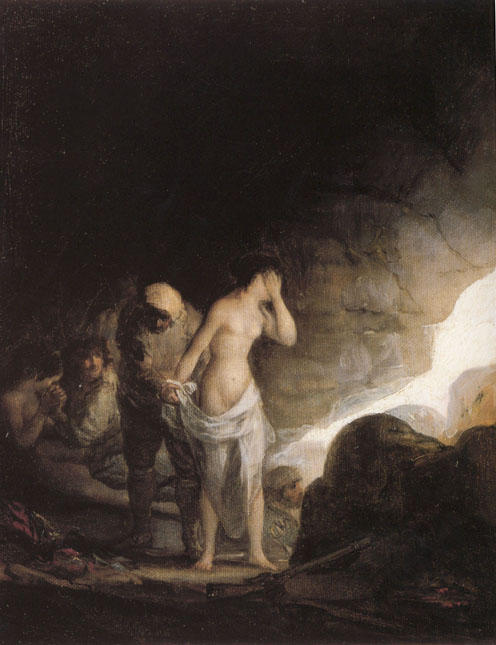
Bandit undressing a woman (1798–1800)

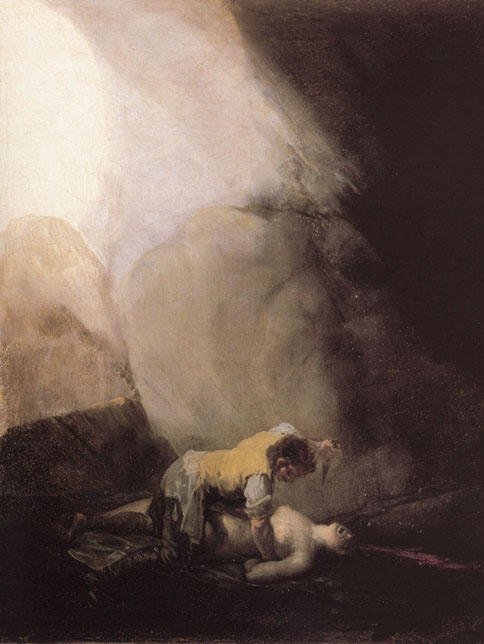
Bandit stabbing a woman (1798–1800)

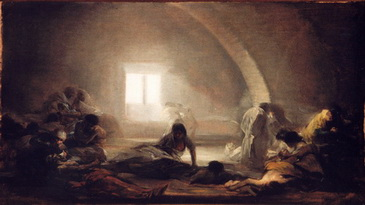
Plague Hospital (1808–1810)

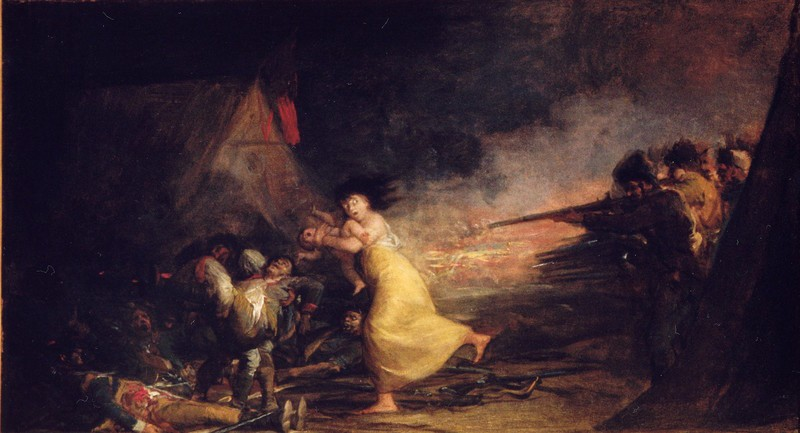
Shooting in a military camp (1808–1810)

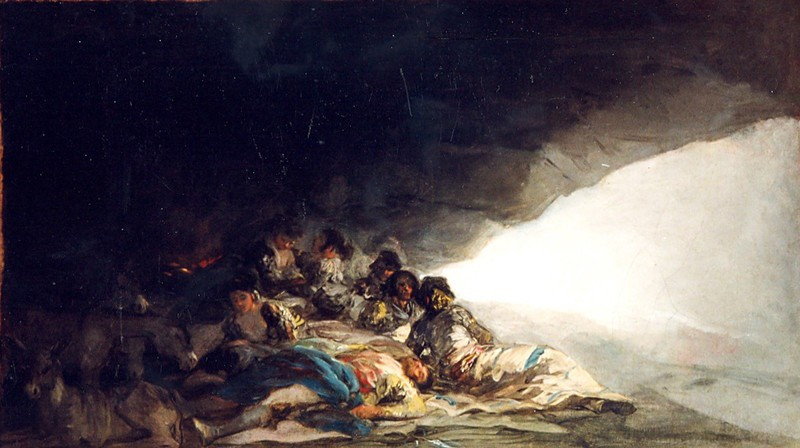
Gypsy Cave (1808–1810)

== See also ==
- Marquisate of La Romana

== Bibliography ==
- Chandler, David G. (1995), The Campaigns of Napoleon, Simon & Schuster, ISBN 0-02-523660-1
- Longford, Elizabeth (1969). Wellington: The Years of the Sword. New York: Harper and Row Publishers.

Spanish nobility
Preceded by Pedro Caro y Fontes	Marquis of La Romana; 1775–1811	Succeeded by Pedro Caro y Salas
