= Second French invasion of Portugal =

1809 Invasion during the Peninsular War

Invasion of Portugal (1809)
- Part of the Peninsular War
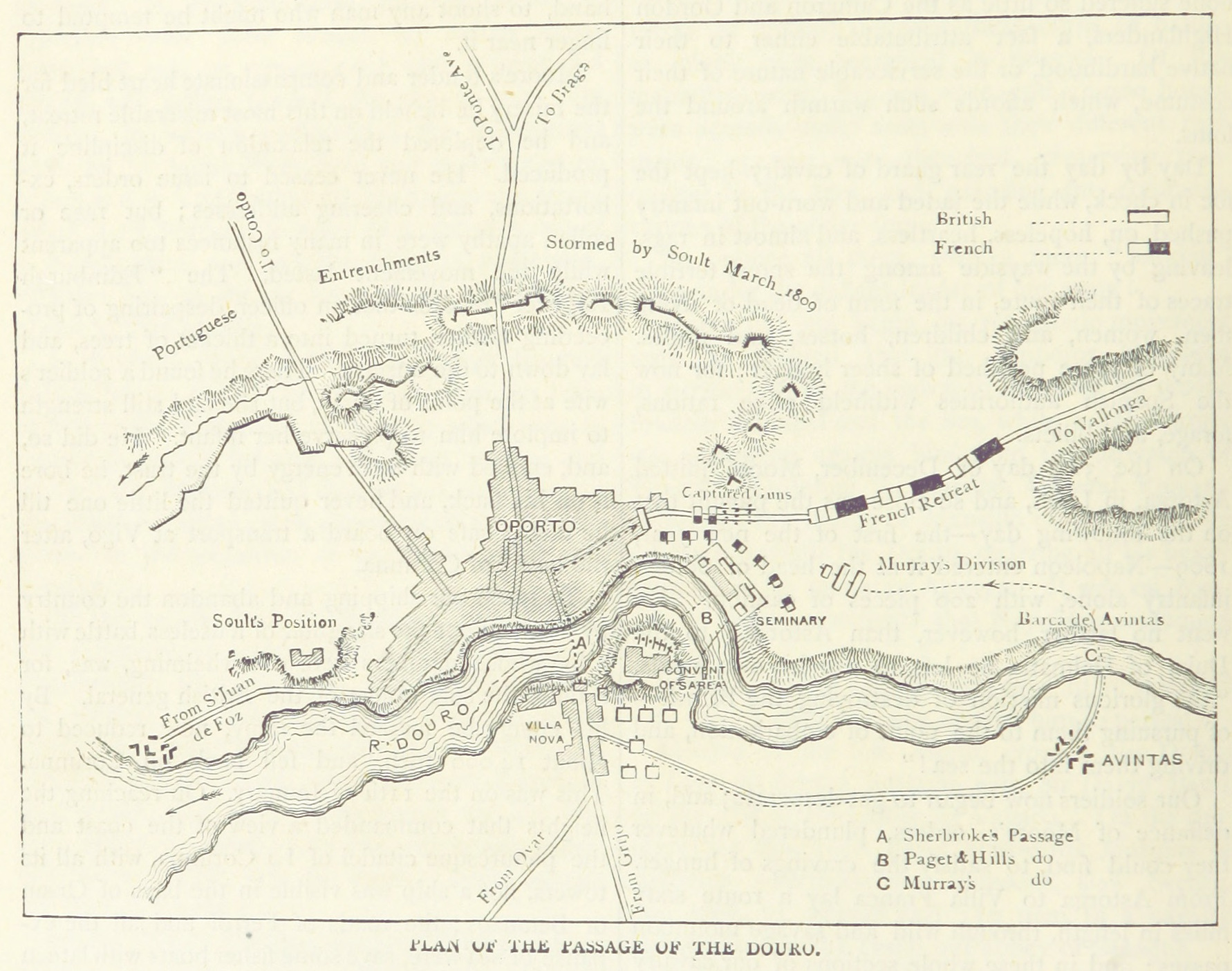
- Map of the Second Battle of the Douro
Date	3 February 1809 – 12 May 1809 (4 months, 1 week, and 2 days)
Location	Portugal
Result	Anglo-Portuguese victory

Belligerents
(First French Empire) France	Portugal (United Kingdom of Great Britain and Ireland) British Empire

Commanders and leaders
(First French Empire) Jean-de-Dieu Soult; (First French Empire) Louis Henri Loison; (First French Empire) Pierre Hugues Victoire Merle; (First French Empire) Julien Augustin Joseph Mermet; (First French Empire) Henri François Delaborde; (First French Empire) Maximilien Sébastien Foy (WIA); (First French Empire) Étienne Heudelet de Bierre; (First French Empire) Jean-Baptiste Franceschi-Delonne; (First French Empire) Armand Lebrun de La Houssaye; (First French Empire) Jean Thomas Guillaume Lorge	Bernardim Freire; Baron Eben; Francisco Silveira; (Portugal) Caetano Parreiras; (Portugal) Francisco Pizarro; (United Kingdom of Great Britain and Ireland) Arthur Wellesley; (United Kingdom of Great Britain and Ireland) Stapleton Cotton; (United Kingdom of Great Britain and Ireland) Edward Paget (WIA); (United Kingdom of Great Britain and Ireland) Rowland Hill; (United Kingdom of Great Britain and Ireland) John Waters

Strength
23,000 men 50 cannons	(Portugal) 30,000 men 50 cannons

Casualties and losses
Total: 6,413–7,113; 1,050–1,250 killed 750–950 wounded 3,600 captured 12 cannons	Total: 16,506–18,507; 12,119–14,120 killed 114 wounded 4,200 captured 50 cannons

Peninsular war: Portugal
1809

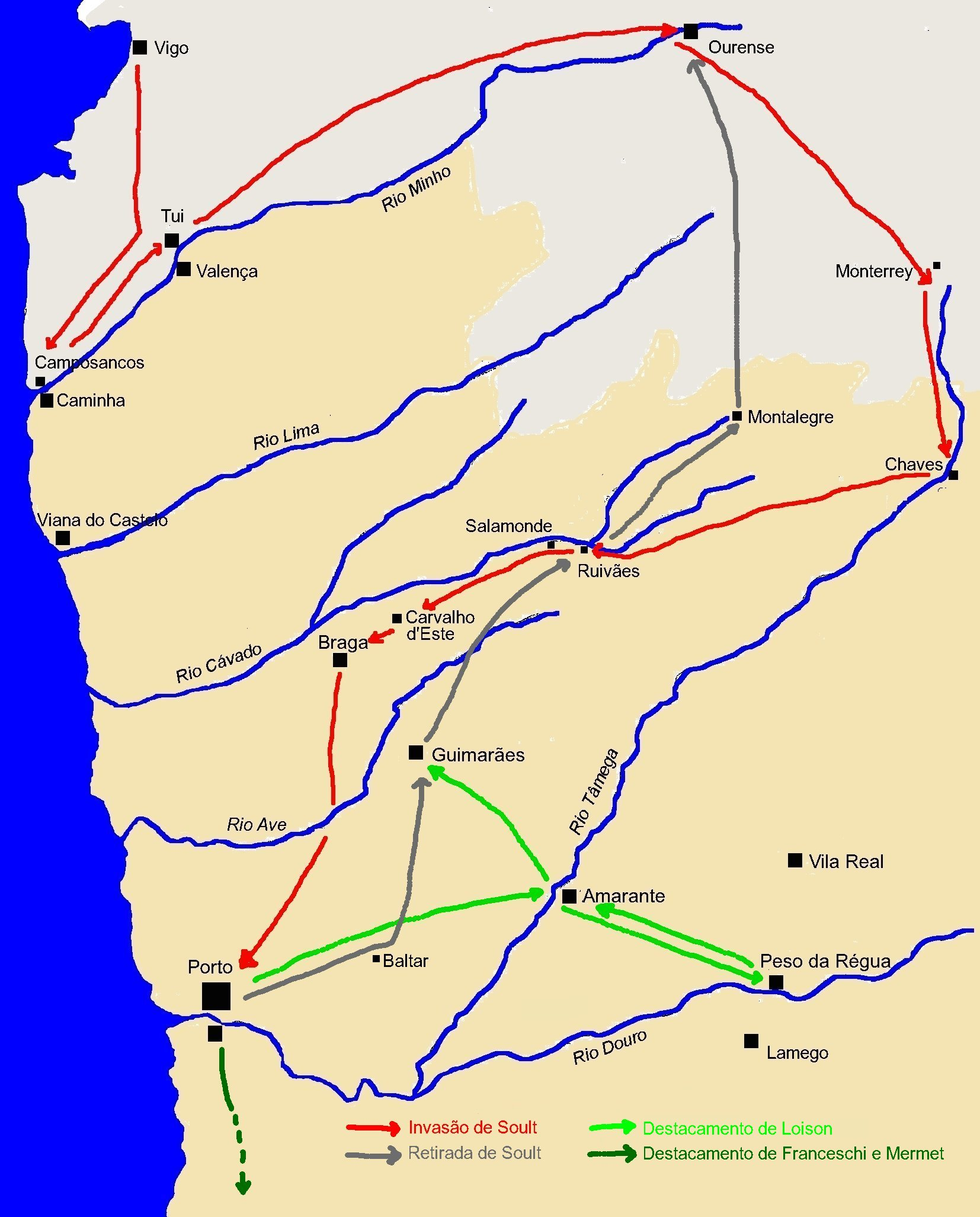
Map showing the different troop movements. Soult's invasion (in red); Soult's retreat (in grey); Loison's manoeuvres (in light green); Franceschi's and Mermet's manoeuvres (in dark green)

The Second French invasion of Portugal, a campaign of the Peninsular War, commenced on 3 February 1809 with French Marshal Soult's II Corps heading down from La Coruña, in the north of Spain to occupy the capital of Portugal, Lisbon.

Napoleon later modified his original plan by ordering Marshal Victor's I Corps, based at Mérida, to send a column commanded by General Lapisse, located in Salamanca, to march westwards, first on Ciudad Rodrigo and then on to Almeida, in Portugal. (Note: The Emperor's new orders, sent from Valladolid on 17 January, also afforded Soult some slight concession in the matter of dates. Instead of having to reach Porto on 1 February, Soult was granted four extra days, and he was then expected to reach Lisbon on the sixteenth instead of the tenth. (Oman, 1903: p. 175.))

The campaign came to an end following the French defeat by Anglo-Portuguese forces at the Second Battle of Porto (12 May 1809), with Soult's army dispersed and having to abandon large amounts of equipment to flee across the mountains back into the north of Spain.

Charles Oman (1903), in his A History of the Peninsular War, Vol. II, sums up the campaign as follows:

The parting instructions of Bonaparte to Soult have already been cited: when the English should have embarked, the Duke of Dalmatia was to march on Oporto, and ten days later was to occupy Lisbon. We have already seen that the scheme of dates which Napoleon laid down for these operations was impossible, even to the borders of absurdity: Oporto was to be seized by February 1, and Lisbon by February 10! But putting aside this error, which was due to his persistent habit of ignoring the physical conditions of Spanish roads and Spanish weather, the Emperor had drawn up a plan which seemed feasible enough. [...] the task assigned to the Duke of Dalmatia did not on the face of it appear unreasonable. (Oman, 1903: pp. 171–172.)

== Background ==
Having pushed Sir John Moore's troops towards Corunna, Soult's army was instructed to march on Porto, and then on to Lisbon, which he should reach by about 10 February. However, his troops were worn out, and his stores exhausted, so he was unable to move forward until 20 February, finally taking Porto on 29 March, and had not yet started for Lisbon when Wellesley's troops Anglo-Portuguese troops defeated him at the Second Battle of Porto, forcing him to abandon the country on 12 May 1809.

== Invasion ==
Having reached the north bank of the Minho, which separates Galicia from Portugal, on its south bank, on 2 February, Soult's vanguard, made up of Franceschi's light horsemen and Lahoussaye's division of dragoons, cleared the Spanish side and waited for the rest of the French troops to catch up on February 16, before entering Portugal.

After having tried, unsuccessfully, to cross the river at Tuy, Soult's troops headed northeast towards Ourense, the first point where there was a bridge over the river. Having crossed, and still in Spain, they defeated La Romana at Monterey (6 – 7 March) and then moved further down, into Portugal, crossing the Portuguese frontier between Monterey and Chaves on 9 March, and towards Porto, laying siege to Chaves, capturing the place on 12 March 1809.

The French army was victorious again at Braga (20 March). However, shortly afterwards, Portuguese forces under Da Silveira managed to recapture Chaves shortly afterwards (21 to 25 March 1809), thereby effectively blocking Soult's communications with Spain.

After defeating the Portuguese at the First Battle of Porto (28 March 1809), Soult then sent out a column under Major-General Louis Loison to open up the route back. A mixed Portuguese force of regular and irregular troops under Major General Francisco da Silveira captured the French garrison of Chaves and then proceeded to blockade the bridge over the Tâmega at the Battle of the Bridge of Amarante, by rigging it with explosives, thereby holding the French troops there from 18 April to 3 May, until French engineers succeeded in disarming the explosives.

== See also ==
- French invasions of Portugal
- Invasion of Portugal (1807)
