= Battle of Braga (1809) =

1809 battle during the Peninsular War

- Part of the Peninsular War
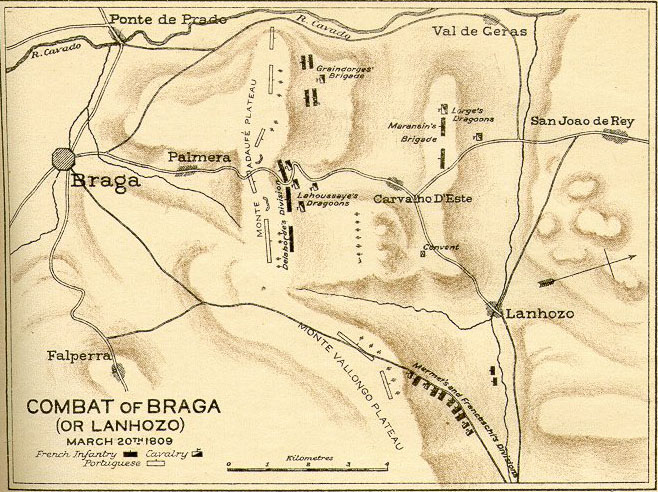
- North is to the right in this Battle of Braga map.
Date	20 March 1809
Location	Braga, Portugal 41°32′39″N 8°25′19″W
Result	French victory

Belligerents
(First French Empire) France	Portugal

Commanders and leaders
(First French Empire) Jean-de-Dieu Soult (First French Empire) Maximilien Foy (First French Empire) Henri Delaborde (First French Empire) Étienne Bierre (First French Empire) Jean Franceschi-Delonne (First French Empire) Armand La Houssaye (First French Empire) Jean Lorge	(Portugal) Baron Eben (Portugal) Bernardim Freire X

Strength
16,000–16,650; 12 guns	23,000–25,000; 18 guns

Casualties and losses
200–600	4,400; 17 guns

Peninsular war: Portugal
1807 1808 1809 1810 1811

The Battle of Braga or Battle of Póvoa de Lanhoso or Battle of Carvalho d'Este (20 March 1809) saw an Imperial French corps led by Marshal Jean-de-Dieu Soult attack a Portuguese army commanded by Baron Eben. When Soult's professional soldiers attacked, the Portuguese at first fought back but soon ran away. The French slaughtered large numbers of their opponents, who were mostly badly disciplined and poorly armed militia. The action was part of the second invasion of Portugal, during the Peninsular War.

After the Battle of Corunna and the British evacuation of northwest Spain, Soult turned his attention to the invasion of Portugal. Fighting their way through swarms of Spanish guerillas, Soult's troops crossed the border into Portugal in early March 1809. After capturing Chaves, Soult's II Corps encountered a horde of unruly militiamen who had just assassinated their commander. The subsequent easy French victory did not discourage the Portuguese resistance. Meanwhile, another Portuguese army was gathering to defend Porto.

Braga is situated about 45 kilometres (28 mi) north-northeast of Porto (Oporto).

== Background ==
The Second Portuguese campaign started with the battle of Braga.

=== Operations in northwest Spain ===
The British won a tactical victory over Soult's II Corps in the Battle of Corunna on 16 January 1809. Thanks to this success, the British army's evacuation continued free from French interference. Emperor Napoleon ordered Soult to invade Portugal as soon as the British army embarked from Corunna (A Coruña). There were only 8,000 British soldiers garrisoning Portugal and the Portuguese army was only just being reconstituted. Soult's corps included four infantry divisions under Pierre Hugues Victoire Merle, Julien Augustin Joseph Mermet, Henri François Delaborde, and Étienne Heudelet de Bierre, and three divisions of cavalry under Jean Thomas Guillaume Lorge, Armand Lebrun de La Houssaye, and Jean Baptiste Marie Franceschi-Delonne. The emperor directed Soult to occupy Porto by 1 February and Lisbon by 10 February, a totally unrealistic schedule. According to the II Corps muster rolls, Soult had 43,000 troops, but 8,000 of its troops were guarding the line of communications and 10,000 men were sick in the hospital. While Soult plunged into Portugal, Galicia in northwest Spain was to be held by Michel Ney's VI Corps, which had 16,000–18,000 men.

Soult accepted the surrender of Ferrol on 26 January 1809 by its pro-French governor, Admiral Melgarejo. The haul included 6,500 Spanish prisoners, eight ships of the line, three frigates, 20,000 British muskets, 1,500 cannons, and other military stores. At this time, Soult loaned Ney one brigade of Lorge's dragoons and, in exchange, added the 17th Light Infantry Regiment to Delaborde's division. On 30 January, Soult's forces headed south, led by the cavalry of Houssaye and Franceschi. The fortresses of Vigo and Tui quickly capitulated, but further French progress was blocked by the flooded Rio Minho. Soult's corps turned upstream toward Ourense, but the roads were bad and the French were seriously harassed by guerillas. On 18 February, Soult sent back to Tui most of his wagon train and 36 of his heavier artillery pieces escorted by Merle's division. He kept only 20 mostly 4-pounder guns and enough mules to carry 500,000 cartridges and 3,000 artillery rounds.

Soult's troops paused at Ourense for nine days, while foraging the countryside for food. The depredations committed by the French soldiers only incited the local inhabitants to fight back even harder. From Ourense, Soult's troops headed for Chaves, Portugal, via Allariz and Monterrei, hoping to crush the Spanish division of Pedro Caro, 3rd Marquis of la Romana on the way. However, Romana took alarm and rapidly marched east to Puebla de Sanabria, abandoning his supplies at Verín. On 6 March, Franceschi's cavalry caught up with Romana's 1,200-man rearguard under Nicolas Mahy at La Trepa. The French horsemen rode down the Spanish soldiers, killing 300 and capturing 400 while sustaining negligible losses. On 9 March, Soult's corps crossed the border into Portugal.

=== Invasion of Portugal ===
At Chaves, Francisco Silveira assembled a force of perhaps 12,000 Portuguese of whom about half were armed with firearms and the others pikes or farm implements. There were 200 cavalry, two understrength infantry regiments, some militia, and a large number of ordenanza, a type of second-line militia. After two skirmishes that ended badly for the Portuguese, Silveira ordered his motley force to abandon Chaves and withdraw to a defensible position south of the town. Believing that Silveira was a traitor, the rabble nearly murdered him and many vowed to defend the town in defiance of his orders. On 10 March, 3,000 men and 1,200 armed citizens barricaded themselves inside Chaves and appointed an engineer officer their leader. Silveira and his 7,000 men wisely retreated from the nearby position after Soult sent the divisions of Delaborde and Houssaye to chase them away. The following day, the Portuguese defending Chaves meekly surrendered. Unable to dispose of so many prisoners, Soult simply sent the armed citizens, militiamen, and ordenanza home and impressed the 500 regulars into a turncoat legion (most deserted at the first opportunity).

Leaving 1,325 sick soldiers at Chaves, together with one healthy company of French infantry and the turncoat Portuguese, Soult set out on 14 March with Franceschi's cavalry and Delaborde's infantry. The rest of Soult's corps was echeloned as follows: Houssaye's cavalry and Mermet's infantry left Chaves on 15 March, Heudelet's infantry and the baggage on 16 March, and Merle's infantry on 17 March. Lorge's remaining brigade was sent on a feint southward toward Silveira's troops at Vila Real. Soult's main forces took a road that went west, crossed the mountains into the Cávado River valley, passed through Ruivães and Salamonde, and entered the plains near Braga. Careful cavalry reconnaissance discovered that the Portuguese weakly defended the mountain passes on this route.

== Battle ==
=== French approach ===
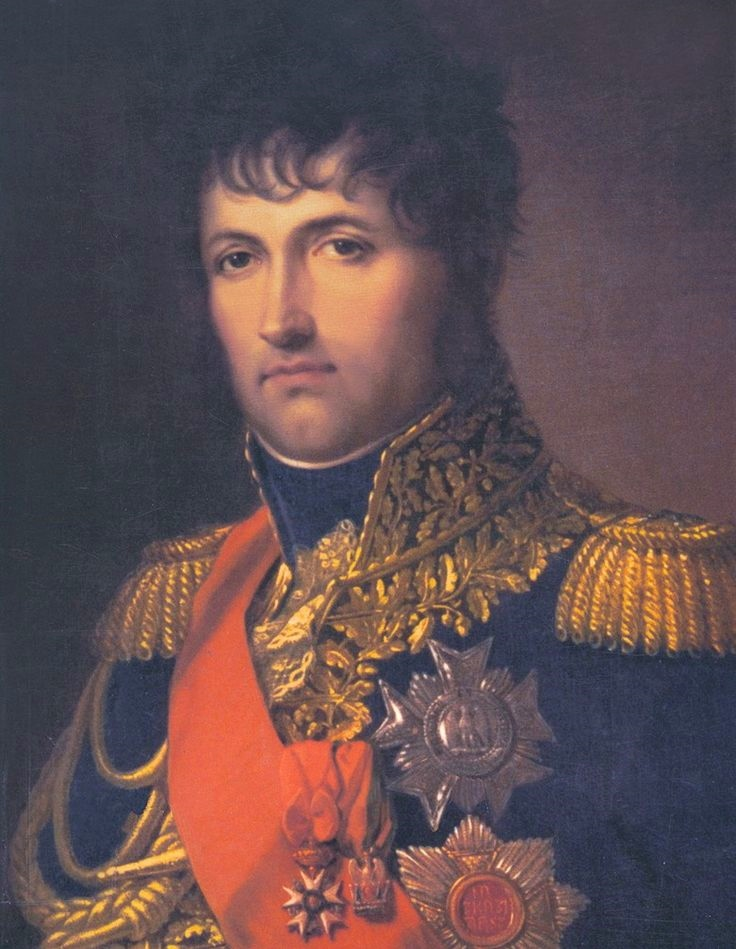
Jean-de-Dieu Soult

Bernardim Freire de Andrade commanded a Portuguese army that numbered about 25,000 men, according to Charles Oman and 23,000 men according to Gaston Bodart. Digby Smith stated that they had 18 guns. The better-armed troops were the 2nd Battalion of the Loyal Lusitanian Legion (700 men), part of the 9th Viana Infantry Regiment, and the Braga militia. There were also 15–20 cannons. The remainder of Freire's army consisted of about 23,000 ordenanza of whom 5,000 were equipped with firearms, 11,000 with pikes, and the rest with farm implements. This horde occupied a 6 mi (9.7 km) long position atop a ridge east of Braga. Freire blundered by keeping his force near Braga and only defending the mountain passes with outposts of fewer than 100 men. The only exception was the Salamonde position which Freire manned with 300 regular troops.

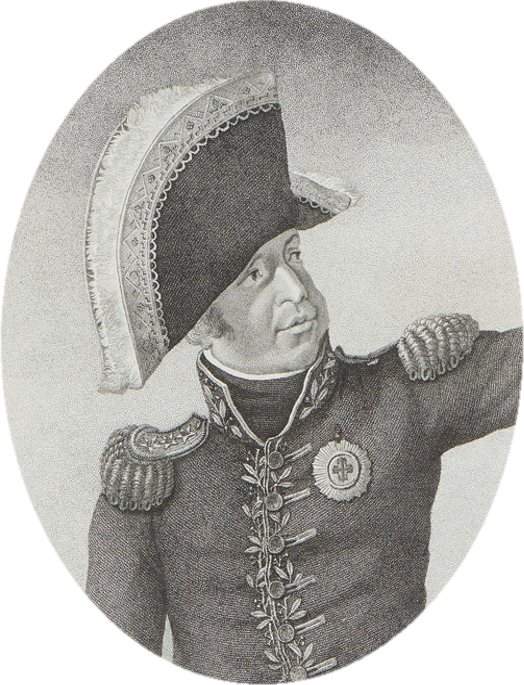
Bernardim Freire

Along Soult's route, the local ordenanza and armed inhabitants defended themselves with suicidal bravery. A French officer wrote that if the Portuguese had capable leaders, the invaders would have had to retreat or be annihilated. Instead, individual homeowners and bands of villagers, including young women, would fight to the death. French stragglers were murdered and sometimes tortured to death. Nevertheless, the frantic resistance was futile and the divisions of Franceschi and Delaborde appeared in front of the main Portuguese defenses on 17 March. Meanwhile, Silveira found that Soult's corps was no longer in front of him, so he sent 3,000 troops to attack Merle's rearguard; this force was easily repulsed. While waiting for the rest of Soult's corps to arrive, Maximilien Sébastien Foy's brigade seized a section of high ground that projected in front of the main Portuguese position. Foy's capture made an excellent artillery position.

Antonio de Castro, the Bishop of Porto was a true Portuguese patriot. He had been appointed to the Portuguese Regency by Hew Whitefoord Dalrymple, but rather than work with his colleagues in Lisbon, he returned to Porto and assumed almost dictatorial powers. He called up large numbers of ordenanza which he could neither arm properly nor keep under control. The British government sent Baron Eben and Friedrich von der Decken as military advisers. Robert Wilson also arrived in Porto and organized the Loyal Lusitanian Legion. However, Wilson soon deduced that the bishop wanted to use his new unit as a personal bodyguard. Therefore, Wilson and nearly 1,500 troops of the 1st Battalion marched to defend the frontier fortress of Almeida, leaving Eben to take command of the 2nd Battalion. In the face of Soult's invasion, the bishop kept most of the troops to defend Porto. When Freire begged for help, the bishop only sent Eben and his battalion to Braga.

=== Action ===
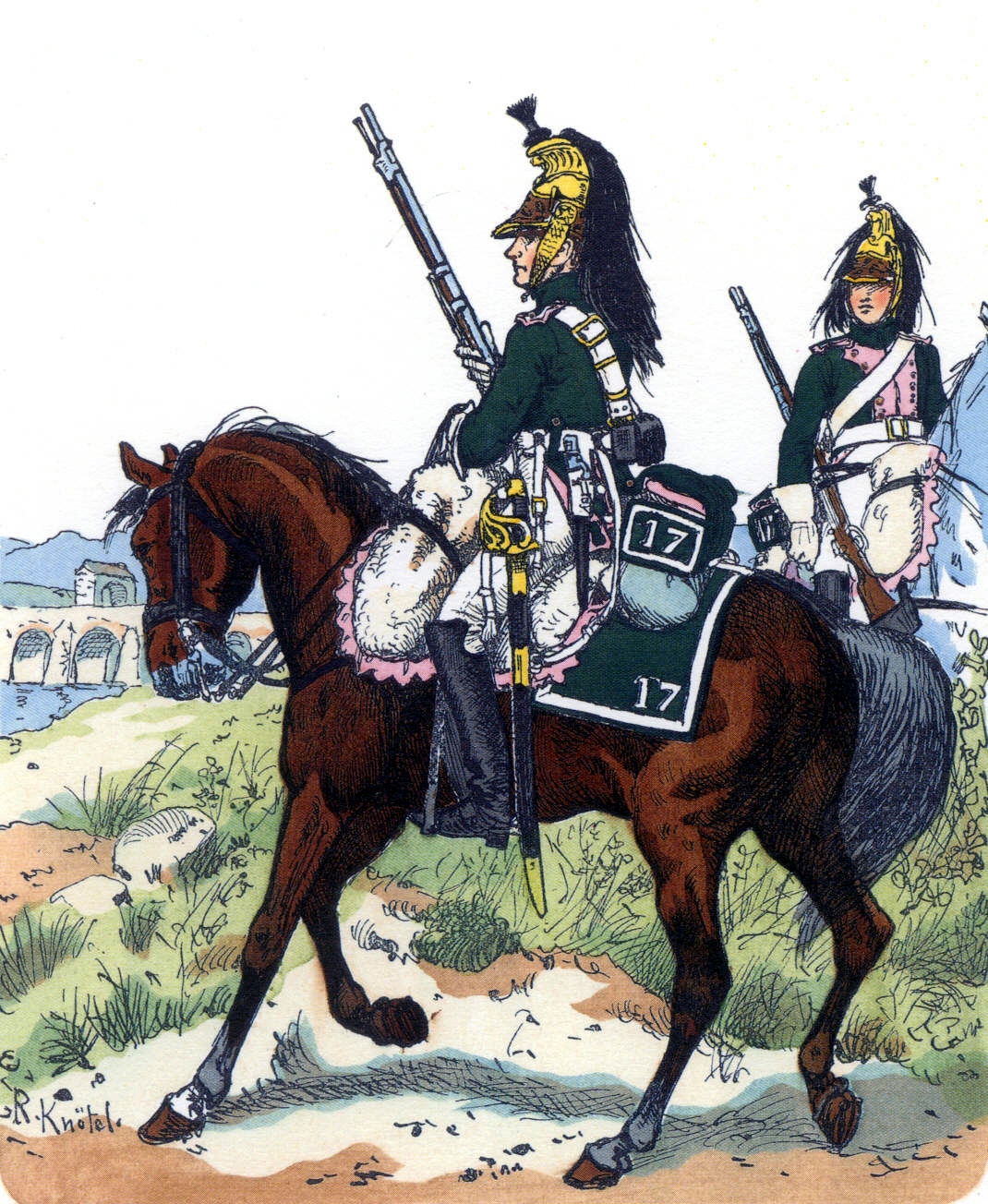
17th Dragoon Regiment

The Portuguese left flank and center held a plateau known as Monte Adaufé, with the left or western end protected by the Cávado River. The main highway passed through the hamlet of Carvalho d'Este, went over Monte Adaufé, and ended at Braga. The village of Ponte do Prado was behind the left flank on the Cávado. The Portuguese right flank defended Monte Vallongo, which was even higher than Monte Adaufé and overlooked the village of Póvoa de Lanhoso. As Soult's professional troops approached, Freire became demoralized and began sending his army's heavy baggage and guns to the rear. Freire wished to retreat to Porto, but since his men were determined to fight, he decided not to do so. Instead, he had his motley troops dig fortifications near the place where the highway crossed Monte Adaufé. The ordenanza who had fought at Salamonde came into camp, vocally accusing Freire of cowardice for not helping them. The soldiers became insubordinate and threatened to kill their leader.

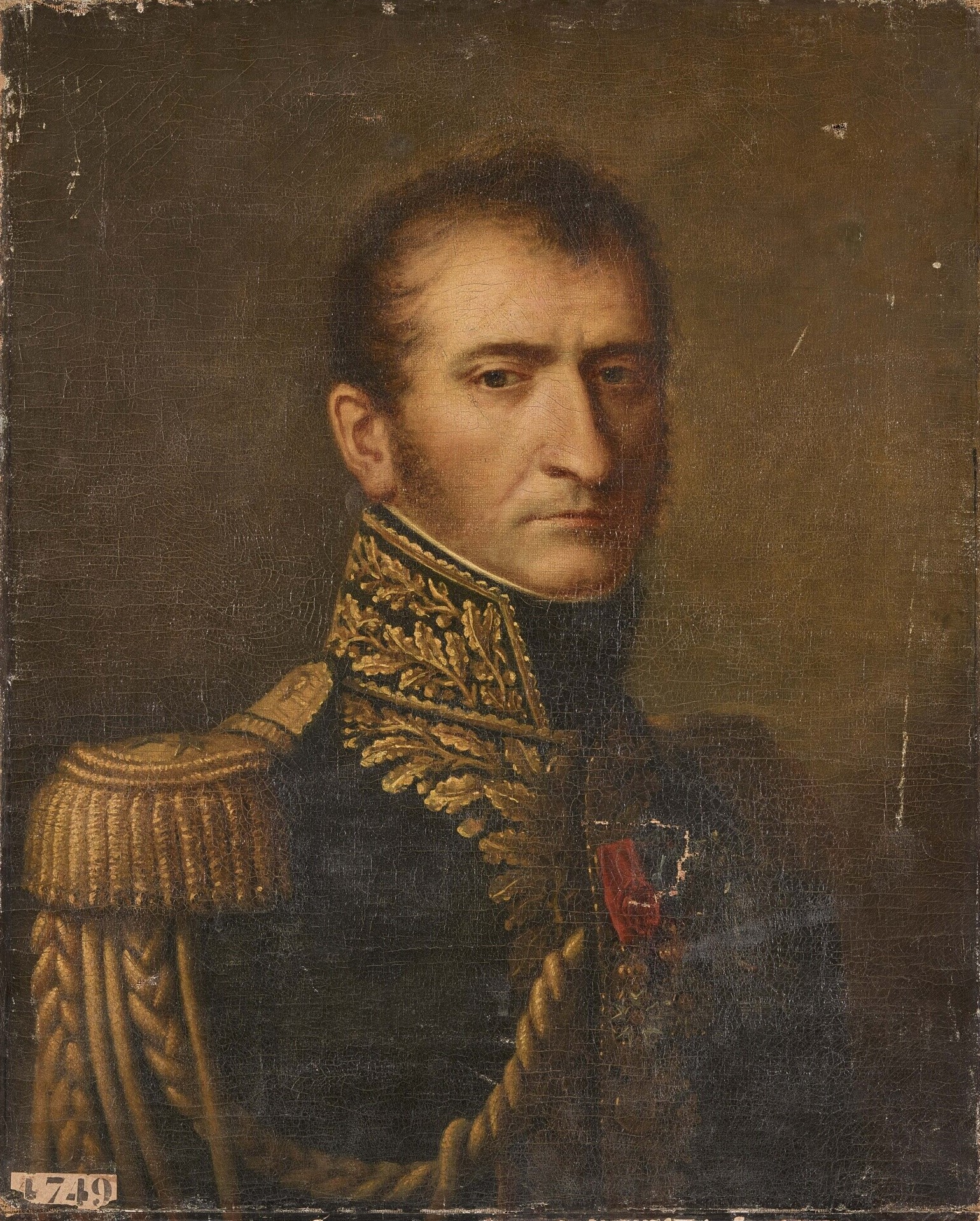
Henri Delaborde

On 17 March, Freire panicked and sneaked away from his army, but he was caught by some ordenanza and hauled back to camp as a prisoner. Eben harangued the soldiers, assumed command of the army, and had Freire confined in the Braga jail. Soon afterward, a group of ordenanza went back to Braga, dragged Freire out of jail, and murdered him with their pikes. They also assassinated the army's chief of engineers and at least one officer on Frere's staff. The malefactors also jailed the chief magistrate of Braga and several other citizens who they suspected of treason. Eben seems to have tacitly approved of these outrages, but the soldiers were out of control and a threat to Eben as well. On 19 March, Eben pushed forward his right flank into Lanhoso, but Mermet's division soon drove this force back to Monte Vallongo. The French captured about 20 Portuguese soldiers in this operation. Soult gave these captives copies of a proclamation offering a pardon for all soldiers who surrendered and sent them back under a flag of truce. As soon as the ordenanza found the proclamations, these unfortunates were instantly murdered.

By the morning on 20 March, all of Soult's corps was present except Merle's division. Oman estimated that the French had 13,000 infantry and 3,000 cavalry; Bodart gave the same totals, while Smith stated that the French had 16,650 men and 12 guns. Knowing that he faced an army of rabble, Soult decided to deliver a frontal assault, believing that the enemy formation would collapse as soon as the French closed with it. Delaborde and Houssaye were ordered to assault the Portuguese center where the highway crossed Monte Adaufé. Mermet and Franceschi were detailed to attack the Portuguese right flank on Monte Vallongo. One of Heudelet's brigades would attack the Portuguese left flank, while the other brigade and Lorge's cavalry remained in reserve. The assault brigade was led by Jean François Graindorge while the reserve brigade was under Jean-Pierre Maransin.

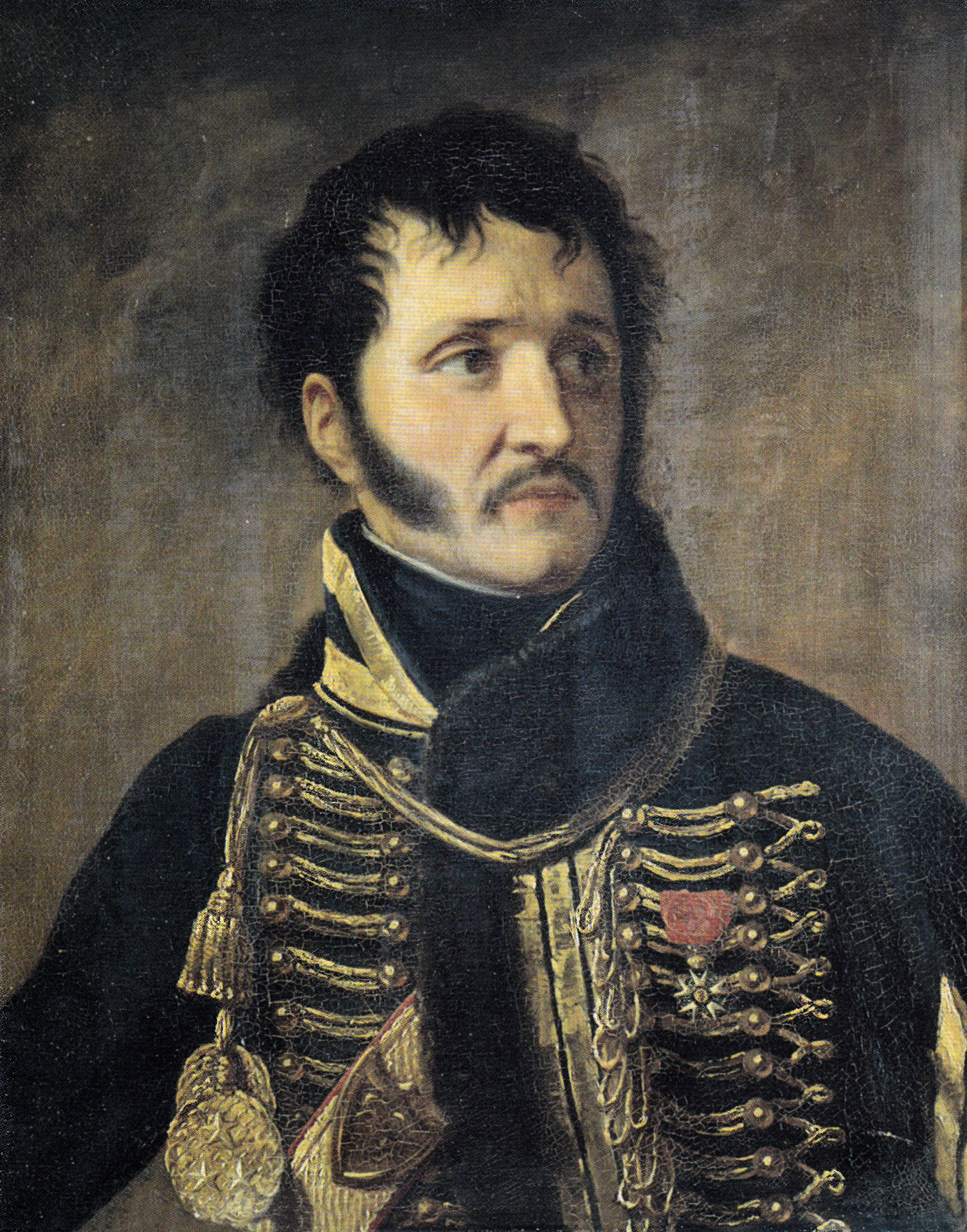
Jean Franceschi

When the infantry of Delaborde and Heudelet advanced, the Portuguese set up a wild cheer and discharged a heavy fire, but this caused relatively few casualties. The Portuguese stayed firm as the French climbed the slope, but as their opponents reached the upper level of the plateau, the defenders began to flinch and scatter. Eben reported that the rout began when one of the Portuguese cannons burst when it was fired. Then Houssaye's cavalry charged into the Portuguese masses, led by the 17th Dragoon Regiment. An officer of the 19th Dragoons wrote, "we made a great butchery of them", cutting down the Portuguese as they fled through the streets of Braga and a considerable distance beyond. Houssaye's dragoons captured guns, baggage, and the Portuguese military chest. Somehow, during the panic, some ordenanza found time to murder the citizens locked up in the city jail. Heudelet's troops also stampeded their adversaries, but without cavalry to pursue, the Portuguese only lost 300 men on that part of the battlefield. Some defenders even rallied at Ponte do Prado and briefly held off the Hanoverian Legion in Heudelet's division. However, when the 26th Line Infantry Regiment came up, the Portuguese ran away again.

The soldiers of Mermet and Franceschi had a longer climb to come to grips with the Portuguese right flank. By the time they reached the crest of Monte Vallongo, the rest of Eben's army was already running away. Resistance on this part of the battlefield was even weaker than on Monte Adaufé. Franceschi's horsemen charged into their fleeing enemies, killing great numbers of them. After being pursued about 5 mi (8.0 km), a body of militia with four guns was cornered near the village of Falperra. Franceschi's cavalry prevented this force from escaping until the 31st Light Infantry Regiment arrived on the scene. The result was a massacre of the trapped Portuguese, half of whom were armed with pikes. An officer of the 31st Light wrote, "The commencement was a fight, the end a butchery".

== Results ==
Soult reported that 4,000 Portuguese were killed and 400 taken prisoner, and that the French captured 17 guns and 5 colors. Soult admitted that the French lost 40 killed and 160 wounded, while Bodart listed 400 French casualties and Smith estimated French losses at 600. One French witness recorded that his soldiers only gave quarter to men in uniform and killed the others. Oman explained the disproportion of killed to prisoners as the result of the French soldiers being in a state of "nervous irritation" at having been constantly the target of snipers and ambushes. Nevertheless, he wrote there was no excuse for the wholesale slaughter that occurred because French losses were relatively light. In his official report, Eben admitted losing only 1,000 men including over 200 from the Loyal Lusitanian Legion.

The French initially believed that the one-sided slaughter would put an end to the guerilla warfare that they had endured, but they were quickly disappointed. While many Portuguese survivors of the debacle went home, a large force reassembled behind the Ave River and prepared to defend its crossings. Portuguese forces blocked Soult's corps from any contact with Tui in northwest Spain and Silveira's troops harassed convoys between Braga and Chaves. Soult allowed his troops three days of rest at Braga, while sending his cavalry to reconnoiter to countryside between there and the Ave River. Leaving Heudelet's division to hold Braga and guard his 600 sick and wounded, Soult marched south.

== Aftermath ==
The next major contest in the Second Portuguese campaign between the French and Portuguese would be the First Battle of Porto on 29 March 1809.

== French order of battle ==
II Corps commander: Marshal Jean-de-Dieu Soult

II Corps at the Battle of Braga
Division	Strength	Regiment	Battalions/Squadrons
2nd Division: General of Division; Julien Augustin Joseph Mermet	5,400	(France) 31st Light Infantry Regiment	4
2nd Division: General of Division; Julien Augustin Joseph Mermet	5,400	(France) 47th Line Infantry Regiment	4
2nd Division: General of Division; Julien Augustin Joseph Mermet	5,400	(France) 122nd Line Infantry Regiment	4
2nd Division: General of Division; Julien Augustin Joseph Mermet	5,400	(Switzerland) 2nd Swiss Infantry Regiment	1
2nd Division: General of Division; Julien Augustin Joseph Mermet	5,400	(Switzerland) 3rd Swiss Infantry Regiment	1
2nd Division: General of Division; Julien Augustin Joseph Mermet	5,400	(Switzerland) 4th Swiss Infantry Regiment	1
3rd Division: General of Division; Henri François Delaborde	5,800	(France) 17th Light Infantry Regiment	3
3rd Division: General of Division; Henri François Delaborde	5,800	(France) 17th Line Infantry Regiment	3
3rd Division: General of Division; Henri François Delaborde	5,800	(France) 70th Line Infantry Regiment	3
3rd Division: General of Division; Henri François Delaborde	5,800	(France) 86th Line Infantry Regiment	3
4th Division: General of Division; Étienne Heudelet de Bierre	3,000	(France) 15th Light Infantry Regiment	1
4th Division: General of Division; Étienne Heudelet de Bierre	3,000	(France) 32nd Light Infantry Regiment	1
4th Division: General of Division; Étienne Heudelet de Bierre	3,000	(France) 26th Line Infantry Regiment	2
4th Division: General of Division; Étienne Heudelet de Bierre	3,000	(France) 66th Line Infantry Regiment	2
4th Division: General of Division; Étienne Heudelet de Bierre	3,000	(France) 82nd Line Infantry Regiment	1
4th Division: General of Division; Étienne Heudelet de Bierre	3,000	(France) Légion du Midi	1
4th Division: General of Division; Étienne Heudelet de Bierre	3,000	(France) Garde de Paris	1
4th Division: General of Division; Étienne Heudelet de Bierre	3,000	(Province of Hanover) Légion Hanovrienne	1
Corps Light Cavalry Division: General of Division; Jean Baptiste Franceschi	1,250	(France) 1st Hussar Regiment	4
Corps Light Cavalry Division: General of Division; Jean Baptiste Franceschi	1,250	(France) 8th Dragoon Regiment	4
Corps Light Cavalry Division: General of Division; Jean Baptiste Franceschi	1,250	(France) 22nd Chasseurs à Cheval Regiment	4
Corps Light Cavalry Division: General of Division; Jean Baptiste Franceschi	1,250	(Province of Hanover) Chasseurs Hanovrienne	4
3rd Dragoon Division: General of Division; Armand Lebrun de La Houssaye	1,200	(France) 17th Dragoon Regiment	4
3rd Dragoon Division: General of Division; Armand Lebrun de La Houssaye	1,200	(France) 18th Dragoon Regiment	4
3rd Dragoon Division: General of Division; Armand Lebrun de La Houssaye	1,200	(France) 19th Dragoon Regiment	4
3rd Dragoon Division: General of Division; Armand Lebrun de La Houssaye	1,200	(France) 27th Dragoon Regiment	4
4th Dragoon Division: General of Division; Jean Thomas Guillaume Lorge	(Note: Smith omitted Lorge's division from his otherwise complete Braga order of battle,(Smith, p. 282) but included it in his Porto order of battle without listing its strength.(Smith, p. 284) One of Lorge's brigades was loaned to Ney's VI Corps (Oman, p. 178) and only the brigade of Jean-Baptiste Theodore Vialannes was retained for Soult's invasion of Portugal.(Oman, p. 229) On 15 January 1809, Lorge's division counted 1,769 men (Oman, p. 171) but on 30 January only 809 were reported present, 617 were absent, and 108 were sick.(Oman, p. 172))	(France) 13th Dragoon Regiment	4
4th Dragoon Division: General of Division; Jean Thomas Guillaume Lorge		(France) 22nd Dragoon Regiment	4

== See also ==
- Timeline of the Peninsular War

== Bibliography ==
- Bodart, Gaston (1908). Militär-historisches Kriegs-Lexikon (1618-1905).
- Esdaile, Charles J. (2003). The Peninsular War. Palgrave MacMillan. ISBN 9781403962317.
- Gates, David (2002). The Spanish Ulcer: A History of the Peninsular War. London: Pimlico. ISBN 0-7126-9730-6.
- Oman, Charles (1995) [1903]. A History of the Peninsular War Volume II. Vol. 2. Mechanicsburg, Pa.: Stackpole. ISBN 1-85367-215-7.
- Smith, Digby (1998). The Napoleonic Wars Data Book. London: Greenhill. ISBN 1-85367-276-9.
