= First Battle of Porto =

1809 battle during the Peninsular War

- Part of the Peninsular War
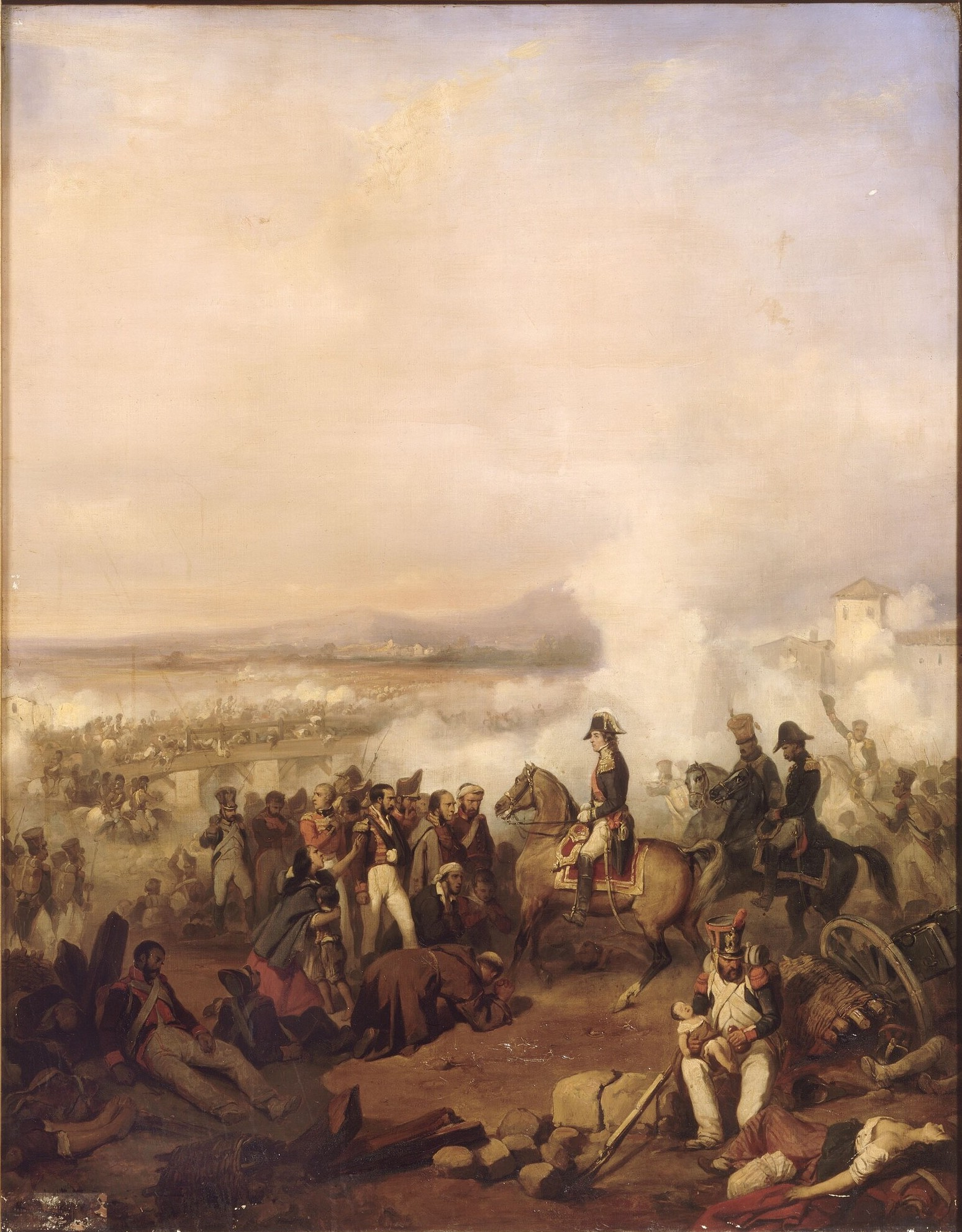
- Marshall Soult surveys the broken bridge as Oporto falls to the French on 29 March 1809. In the foreground a grenadier rescues an orphaned baby.
Date	29 March 1809
Location	Porto, Portugal 41°9′43.71″N 8°37′19.03″W
Result	French victory

Belligerents
Portugal	(France) French Empire

Commanders and leaders
(Portugal) Caetano Parreiras	(France) Jean de Dieu Soult

Strength
30,000	16,000

Casualties and losses
8,000–10,000 killed Unknown wounded	500 killed or wounded
- 4,000 civilians killed

Peninsular War: Second French invasion
current battle

In the First Battle of Porto (29 March 1809) the French under Marshal Soult defeated the Portuguese, under General Parreiras, outside the city of Porto (Note: Porto has traditionally been called Oporto in English.) during the Peninsular War. Soult followed up his success by storming the city, in the course of which thousands of fleeing citizens drowned in the Porto Boat Bridge disaster.

== Background ==
The Second Portuguese campaign started with the Battle of Braga.

== Soult's invasion of Portugal ==
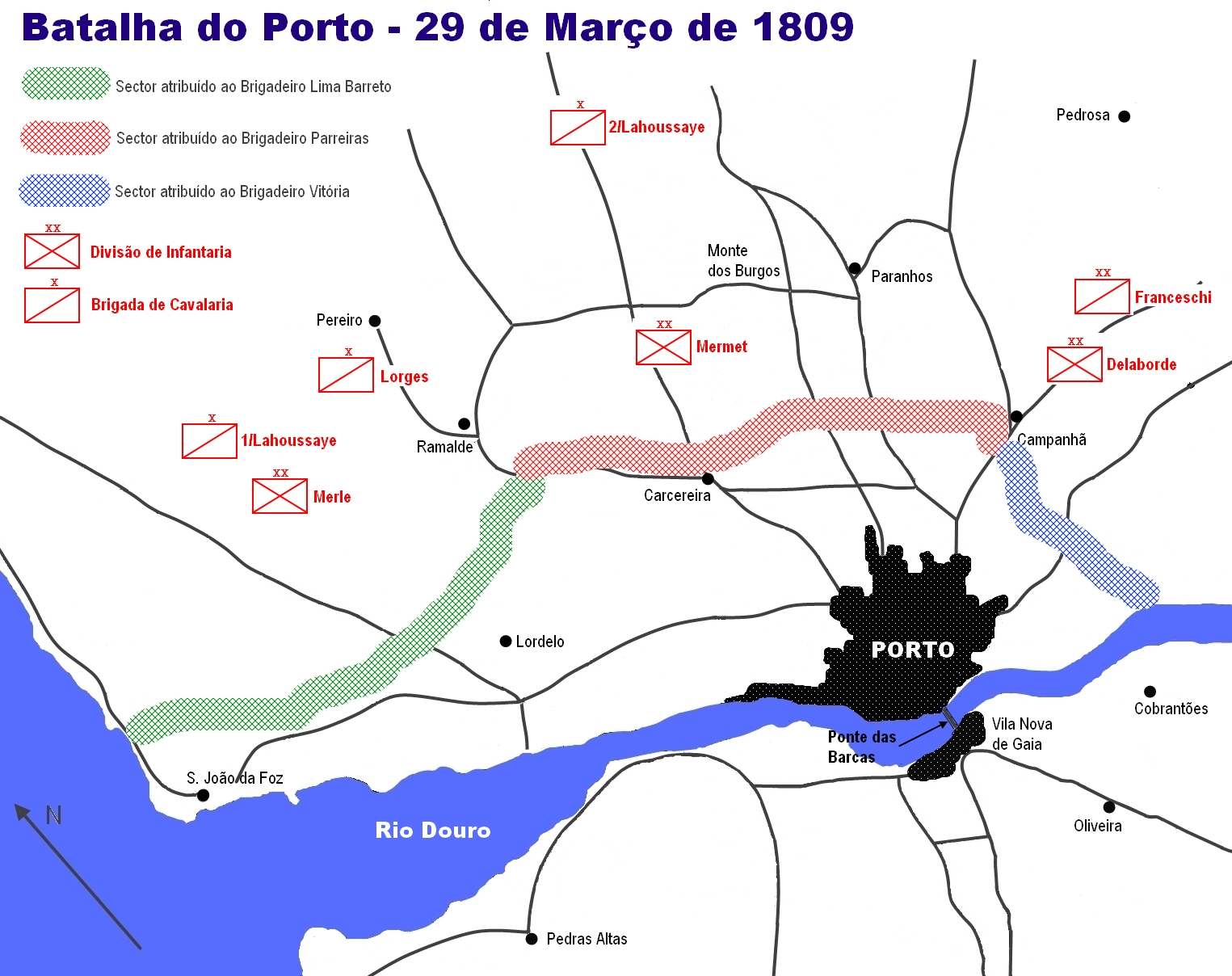
Troop movements

After the Battle of Corunna, Napoleon ordered Marshal Jean-de-Dieu Soult to invade Portugal from the north. He was to seize Porto by 1 February and Lisbon by 10 February. Napoleon failed to take into account both the wretched condition and the roads or the fact that a full-scale guerrilla war had broken out in Northern Portugal and Spain.

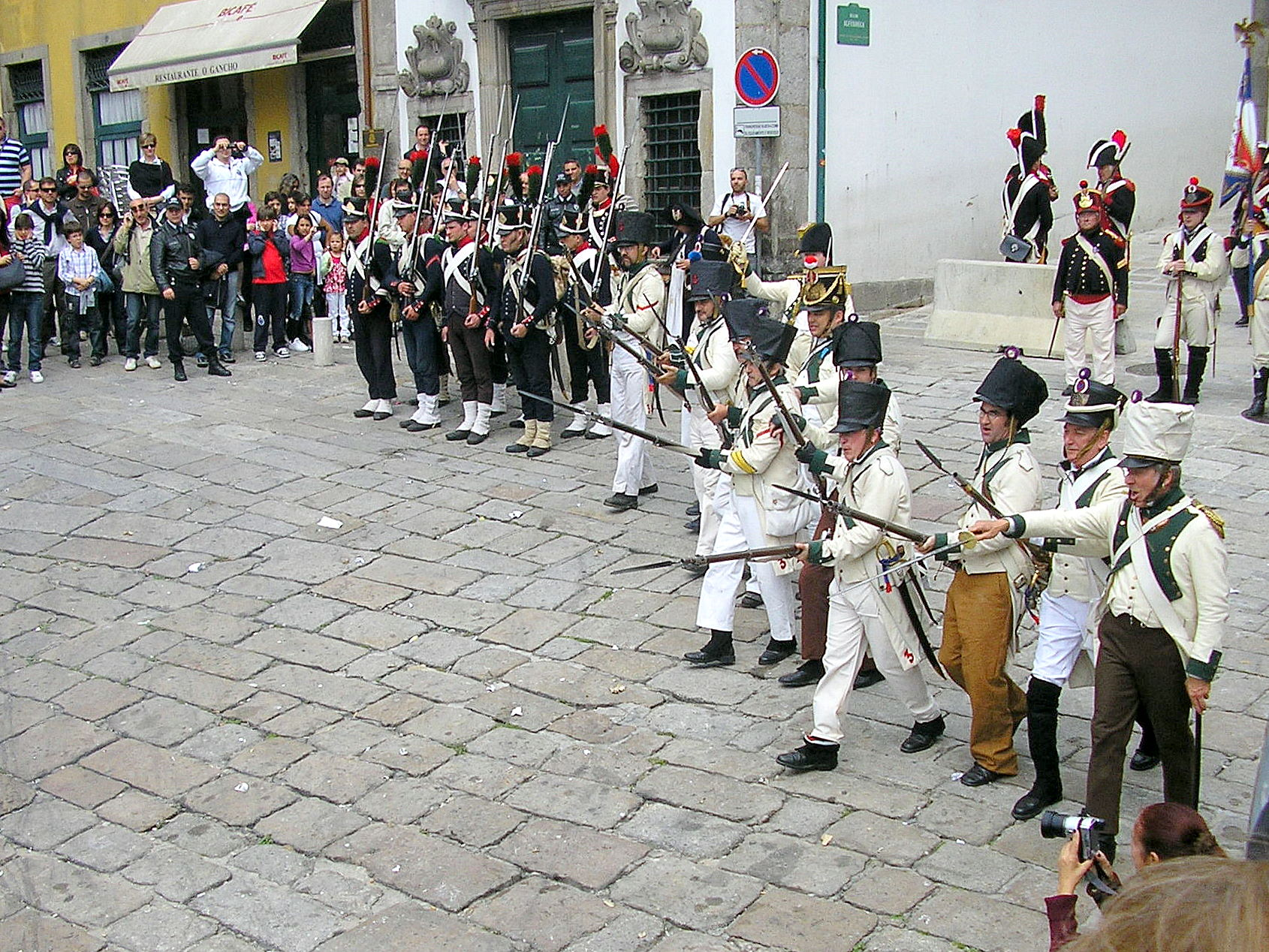
Battle of Porto reenactment, in 2009

Soult's II Corps had four infantry divisions, commanded by Generals of Division Pierre Hugues Victoire Merle, Julien Augustin Joseph Mermet, Étienne Heudelet de Bierre, and Henri François Delaborde. Merle had four battalions each of the 2nd Light, 4th Light and 15th Line Infantry Regiments and three battalions of the 36th Line. Mermet's division included four battalions each of the 31st Light, 47th Line, and 122nd Line, and one battalion each of the 3rd, 4th and 5th Swiss Regiments. Heudelet led two battalions each of the 22nd Line and 66th Line, one battalion each of the 15th Light, 32nd Light, 82nd Line, Légion du Midi, Paris Guard, and Hanoverian Legion. Delaborde's command comprised three battalions each of the 17th Light, 70th Line, and 86th Line. General of Division Jean Baptiste Marie Franceschi-Delonne led Soult's corps cavalry, the 1st Hussar, 8th Dragoon, 22nd Chasseur à Cheval, and Hanoverian Chasseur Regiments. Attached were General of Division Armand Lebrun de La Houssaye's 3rd Dragoon Division and General of Division Jean Thomas Guillaume Lorge's 4th Dragoon Division. The 3rd Dragoon Division was made up of the 17th, 18th, 19th and 27th Dragoon Regiments. The 4th Dragoon Division consisted of the 13th, 15th, 22nd and 25th Dragoon Regiments. In all, Soult had 23,500 men, including 3,100 cavalry.

Soult's first attempt to invade Portugal was stopped by the local militia on 16 February. The French then moved northeast to Ourense in Spain, seized an unguarded bridge and marched south. On the way, Franceschi's cavalry overran Major General Nicolás Mahy's Spanish brigade at La Trepa on 6 March, inflicting 700 casualties. The French crossed into Portugal and occupied Chaves on 9 March.

From Chaves, Soult moved west to Póvoa de Lanhoso where he was confronted by Baron Eben's 25,000-man army composed mostly of Portuguese militia armed with muskets, pikes, and agricultural implements. After waiting several days for all his troops to arrive, Soult went over to the attack. On 20 March 1809, at the Battle of Braga the French veterans butchered their adversaries. The outmatched Portuguese lost 4,000 killed and 400 captured. The French, who lost 40 killed and 160 wounded, also seized 17 Portuguese cannons.

== Battle ==
Bishop Castro organized an army of 24,000 men to defend Porto.

Generals Lima and Parreiras commanded two battalions, each of the 6th, 18th and 21st Infantry Regiments, and one battalion of the 9th and other units. The 4,500 Portuguese regulars were supported by 10,000 ordenanças (militia) and 9,000 armed citizens. When Soult hurled Merle, Mermet, Heudelet, Franceschi and Lahoussaye at the Portuguese deployed north of the city, on the weakest part of the Portuguese line of defence, Castro's force soon dissolved and the battle became a massacre. The Portuguese tried to escape from the French in the city but were chased by the French cavalry through the streets, and their regular units were annihilated.

=== The Boat Bridge Disaster ===
Thousands of fleeing civilians drowned in the Porto Boat Bridge disaster. The Ponte das Barcas ( Bridge of Boats) was a permanent pontoon bridge across the Douro River. Residents fled over the he bridge away from Porto towards the south, Gaia side, pursued by French troops. Some Portuguese units started to sabotage the bridge to prevent the French from crossing the river and the bridge collapsed because of the weight of people and of Portuguese artillery fire (coming from the left side of the Douro) who were aiming at the French cavalry behind the Portuguese soldiers and citizens.

=== Capture of the city ===
In the roadstead, Soult captured a squadron of Spanish naval vessels and 30 merchant ships. The French also found large stockpiles of British military stores. In the battle and storming of the city, the French lost 72 officers and 2,000 rank and file casualties. The Portuguese lost about 8,000 killed and 197 cannons captured.

Soult did not have very long to enjoy his success; Almost at once, the ordenanças cut his communications with Spain and a 1,800-man garrison was forced to capitulate to Francisco Silveira's Portuguese force in the Siege of Chaves. The French marshal started planning a retreat.

== Aftermath ==
The Second Portuguese campaign proceeded with the Battle of Grijó. Porto was retaken by the British and Portuguese under Wellesley in the Second Battle of Porto.

== See also ==
- Timeline of the Peninsular War

== Bibliography ==
- Bodart, Gaston (1908). Militär-historisches Kriegs-Lexikon (1618-1905).
- Buttery, David (2016). Wellington Against Soult: The Second Invasion of Portugal, 1809. Pen and Sword.
- Esdaile, Charles J. (2003). The Peninsular War. Palgrave MacMillan. ISBN 9781403962317.
- Glover, Michael (1974). The Peninsular War 1807-1814. Penguin.
- Smith, Digby (1998). The Napoleonic Wars Data Book. Greenhill.

Preceded by Battle of Ciudad Real	Napoleonic Wars; First Battle of Porto	Succeeded by Battle of Medellín
