= Second Battle of Porto =

1809 battle of the Peninsular War

- Part of the Peninsular War
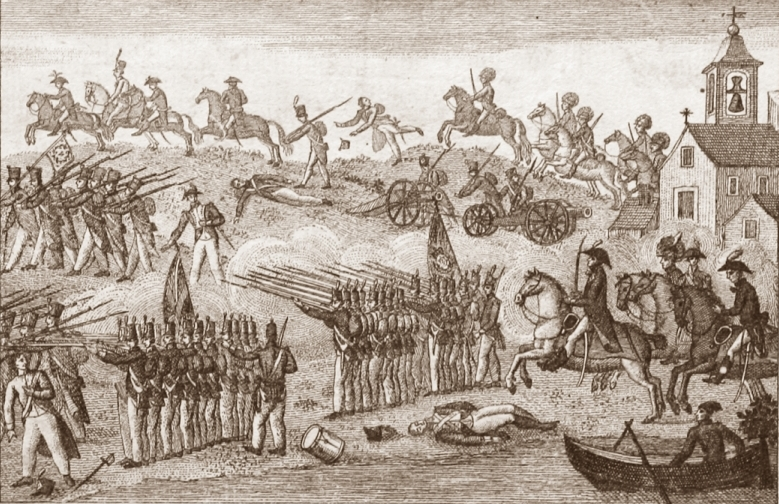
- Engraving of the battle
Date	12 May 1809
Location	Porto, Portugal 41°9′43.71″N 8°37′19.03″W
Result	Anglo-Portuguese victory

Belligerents
United Kingdom; Portugal	France

Commanders and leaders
(United Kingdom of Great Britain and Ireland) Sir Arthur Wellesley	(First French Empire) Jean-de-Dieu Soult

Strength
18,400–27,000	13,000

Casualties and losses
125 killed or wounded	2,200 killed, wounded or captured (Bodart); 600 killed or wounded 1,800 captured (Smith)

Peninsular war: Portugal
1807 1808 1809 1810 1811

The Second Battle of Porto, also known as the Battle of the Douro or the Crossing of the Douro, took place on 12 May 1809. General Arthur Wellesley's Anglo-Portuguese Army defeated Marshal Soult's French troops and took back the city of Porto. After taking command of the British troops in Portugal on 22 April, Wellesley (later named 1st Duke of Wellington, Marquess Douro) immediately advanced on Porto and made a surprise crossing of the Douro River, approaching Porto where its defences were weak. Soult's late attempts to muster a defence were in vain. The French quickly abandoned the city in a disorderly retreat.This battle ended the Second French invasion of Portugal. Soult soon found his retreat route to the east blocked and was forced to destroy his guns and burn his baggage train. Wellesley pursued the French army, but Soult's army escaped annihilation by fleeing through the mountains.

== Background ==
The Second Portuguese campaign had started with the Battle of Braga.

=== French occupation ===
In the First Battle of Porto (28 March 1809), the French under Marshal Soult defeated the Portuguese under Generals Lima Barreto and Parreiras outside the city of Porto. After winning the battle, Soult stormed the city. In addition to 8,000 military casualties, large numbers of civilians died. Approximately half of these are thought to have died in the Porto Boat Bridge disaster, when the city's only bridge, a pontoon bridge (or 'ponte de barcas'), was destroyed.

Having thus secured Portugal's second city, with its valuable dockyards, arsenals and materiel Soult halted at Porto to refit his army before a planned advance on Lisbon.

While Soult was in Porto, a detached French force operated to the east under the leadership of Major-General Louis Loison. Initially, this force included General of Division Henri Delaborde's infantry division and Lorge's cavalry division. A Portuguese force under Major General Francisco Silveira captured the French garrison of Chaves, a border town on the river Minho, and blocked Soult's communications with Spain by blockading the area around Amarante.

From 18 April to 3 May, the Portuguese held Loison on the west bank of the Tâmega River. On the latter day, French engineers succeeded in disarming the explosives-rigged bridge so that Delaborde's infantry could cross it.

Soult's refitting in Porto proceeded at a rather leisurely pace. His plans to advance south to Lisbon were then disrupted by the return to Portugal in April 1809 of General Arthur Wellesley, to command the British army, reinforced with Portuguese regiments trained by General Beresford. Wellesley immediately adopted an offensive strategy and his combined force proceeded to advance rapidly north from Lisbon via Coimbra towards Porto.

By the second week of May 1809 it was clear to Soult that his original plan to advance to Lisbon was unworkable, indeed he was more concerned about Wellesley's rapid advance and the deficiencies in his own lines of communication. He decided to abandon Porto and withdraw north eastwards back to Spain. On 11 May he sent General of Division Julien Augustin Joseph Mermet's division off with the baggage and the artillery park. Soult himself stayed up late that night with his staff drawing up his remaining withdrawal plans.

Soult was, however, in no great hurry to complete his withdrawal from Porto, because he considered himself to be in a strong defensive position. The river Douro formed a formidable natural barrier: tidal, deep, fast-flowing and 200 yards wide in Porto. There was no bridge: the only crossing, a pontoon bridge between Porto and Vila Nova de Gaia, had been destroyed two months previously during the First Battle of Porto. Soult's army had also either destroyed or removed to the Porto side of the river all the boats from the opposite bank at Vila Nova de Gaia, and many of them were now moored on the north bank on the wharves of Ribeira, where they lay under the guard of French troops. There were many such boats, in particular wine barges, because Porto was (and remains) the hub of the port wine trade, and many wine cellars were located in Vila Nova de Gaia (as they still are to this day). Soult believed that Wellesley's army could only cross the Douro downstream of Porto, and with great difficulty. To cover such a threat, Soult's troops were largely deployed to the west of the city.

Soult retained a total of 10,000 infantry and 1,200 cavalry in Porto. Delaborde's division included three battalions each of the 17th Light, 70th Line, and 86th Line Infantry Regiments. General of Division Pierre Hugues Victoire Merle's division was composed of four battalions each of the 2nd and 4th Light Infantry Regiments, and three battalions of the 36th Line Infantry Regiment. General of Division Jean Baptiste Marie Franceschi-Delonne's cavalry was made up of the 1st Hussar Regiment, 8th Dragoon Regiment, and the 22nd and Hanoverian Chasseurs à Cheval Regiments.

=== Anglo-Portuguese advance ===
After coming up from Lisbon at pace, on 11 May the Anglo-Portuguese force under Wellesley fought a skirmish with the French 10 miles south of Porto at the Battle of Grijó. Arriving later the same day at Vila Nova de Gaia on the Douro immediately opposite Porto, Wellesley was unable to cross the river, as Soult had anticipated. Wellesley positioned his army there, with his headquarters in the prominent convent Monastery of Serra do Pilar (Mosteiro da Nossa Serra do Pilar in Portuguese) on high ground on the south bank, level with the heights of Porto on the north bank. The monastery still stands, the dominant feature of the southern skyline viewed from Porto.

According to one historian, 18,400 men at Wellesley's command were organised thus:

- Lieutenant General (LG) William Payne's Cavalry Division
  - 1st Cavalry Brigade (MG Stapleton-Cotton; 14th LD (minus one sqn), 16th LD, 20th LD (2 sqns) and 3rd King's German Legion (KGL) LD (1 sqn))
- LG Edward Paget's Division (5,145)
  - 1st KGL Brigade (Brigadier General (BG) Langwerth; 1st and 2nd KGL Line)
  - 3rd KGL Brigade (BG Dreiburg; 5th and 7th KGL Line)
  - 6th Brigade (BG R. Stewart; 29th, 1st Bn of Detachments and 1/16th Port. Line)
- LG John Coape Sherbrooke's Division (6,706)
  - 2nd Guards Brigade (BG Henry Frederick Campbell; 1/Coldstream Gds and 1/3rd Guards)
  - 4th Brigade (BG Sontag; 97th, 2nd Bn of Detachments and 2/16th Port. Line)
  - 5th Brigade (BG A. Campbell; 2/7th, 2/53rd and 1/10th Port. Line)
- MG Rowland Hill's Division (4,370)
  - 1st Brigade (nominally MG Hill, in fact his senior Col.; 1/3rd, 2/48th and 2/66th)
  - 7th Brigade (BG A. Cameron; 2/9th, 2/83rd and 2/10th Port. Line)

There were four 6-gun artillery batteries (RA: Sillery, Lawson. KGL: Tieling, Heise) under Colonel (Col) Edward Howorth. One had 9-pounders, two had 6-pounders and one had 3-pounders.

Historian Michael Glover stated that the order of battle was somewhat different. Glover lists the following organization.

- 1st Guards Brigade: BG Henry F. Campbell, 2,292 (same as 2nd Brigade above)
- 2nd Brigade: BG Alexander Campbell, 1,206 (same as 5th Brigade above)
- 3rd Brigade: BG John Sontag, 1,307 (same as 4th Brigade above)
- 4th Brigade MG Rowland Hill, 2,007 (same as 1st Brigade above)
- 5th Brigade: BG Alan Cameron, 1,316 (same as 7th Brigade above)
- 6th Brigade: BG Richard Stewart, 1,290 (same as above)
- 7th Brigade: MG John Murray, 8th Baronet, 2,913 (same as 1st and 3rd KGL Brigades above, plus detachments of 1st and 2nd KGL Light)
- Cavalry: MG Stapleton Cotton, 1,463 (same as above)
- Artillery: Col Edward Howorth, 24 guns (same as above)

Farther to the east, William Carr Beresford (Marshal of the Portuguese army) led MG Christopher Tilson's British 3rd brigade (1,659 British and ca. 600 Portuguese grenadiers by 6 May morning state) and 5,000 Portuguese to link up with Silveira's force. They threatened Soult's line of retreat. MG Alex Randoll Mackenzie's British 2nd brigade and a large Portuguese force operated some distance away on the line of the Tagus river.

== Battle ==
From his position at the Monastery of Serra do Pilar, Wellesley scanned the opposite bank of the Douro and observed on high ground on the north bank a mile east of the centre of Porto, outside the city walls, the diocesan seminary of Porto (sometimes referred to as the Bishop's Seminary). It was large, solidly constructed, three storeys high, and a potential fortifiable strongpoint. (The restored seminary building still stands today, in Largo do Padre Baltazar Guedes, and now houses the Porto Orphan's College; it bears a memorial plaque to the battle). Viewed through telescopes by British officers on the south side of the river, the seminary appeared not to have been fortified or manned by French troops.

On the morning of 12 May, Wellesley tasked Colonel John Waters (British Army officer, born 1774), an enterprising intelligence officer who spoke Portuguese, with finding a means of crossing the river Douro upstream, east of Porto. On the river bank a few hundred yards upstream from the Monastery of Serra do Pilar, he encountered a local barber, who led him to a small skiff, hidden in brush. On the north bank opposite, not far from the seminary, four wine barges were moored, seemingly unguarded. Colonel Waters took a small, unorthodox group consisting of the barber, a prior (as a guide) and a number of local boatmen across the river in the little skiff. Bends in the river and the topography of Porto meant that the crossing point was out of sight of French forces. Waters' improbable little party managed to capture and bring back the four wine barges, crossing the river unobserved. They also brought the critical confirmation that the seminary was indeed unoccupied.

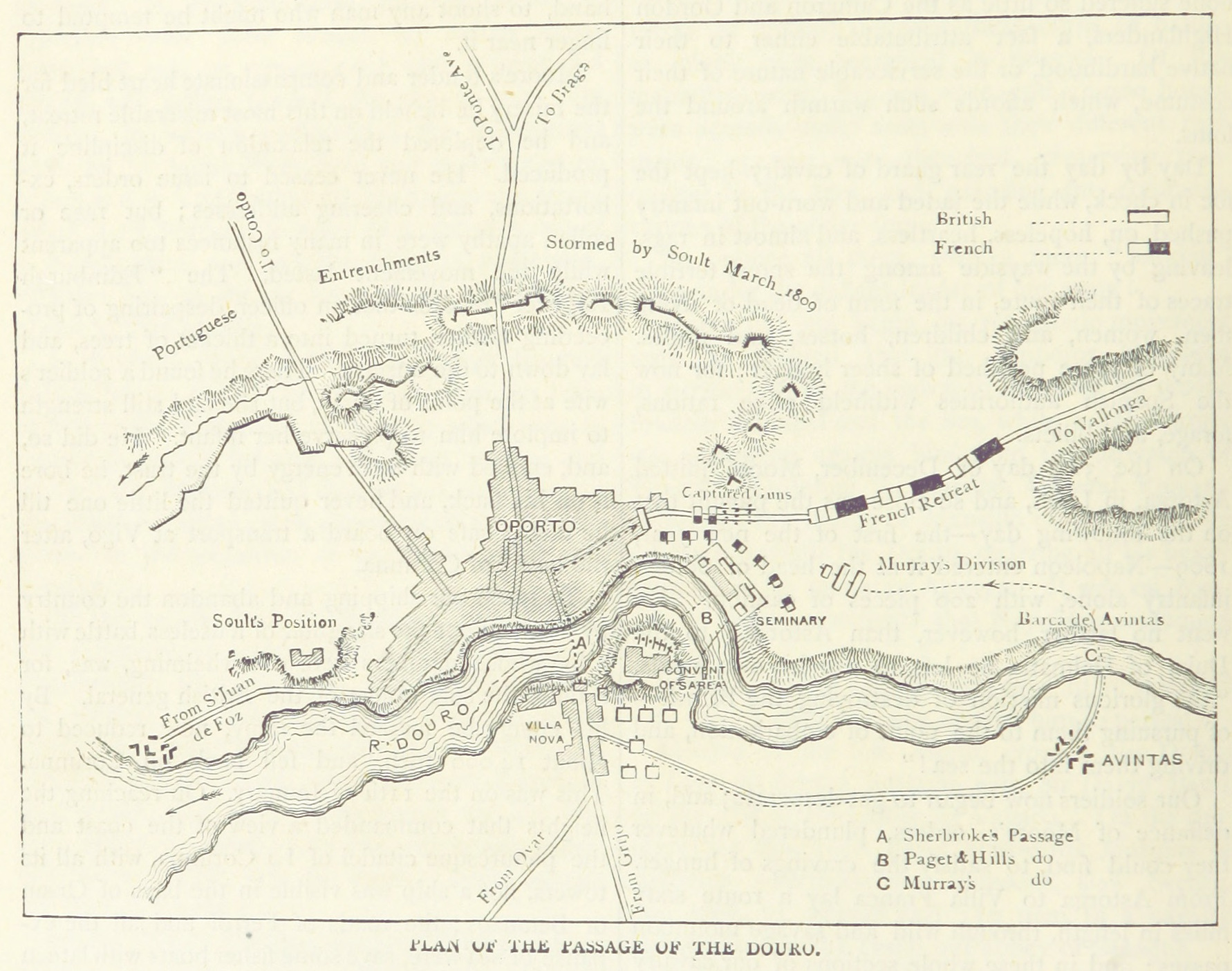
A map of the battle

Informed of this godsend opportunity to cross the river and seize a fortifiable bridgehead on the opposite bank, Wellesley did not hesitate, calmly stating, "well, let the men cross". Immediately, a platoon comprising a junior officer and 24 men from the 3rd Foot crossed the river in one of the captured wine barges and entered the seminary, which overlooked the landing site, and began to fortify it. They were swiftly followed by the rest of their company, and then the light company of the same battalion. By the time the French realised that Wellesley's forces were on the north bank, and endangering their eastern flank, the "Buffs" had fortified their position, the rest of the battalion of the "Buffs" from Hill's brigade were crossing in a steady succession of wine barges, and the bridgehead force was under the command by of one of Wellesley's most respected officers, Major-General Edward Paget.

Soult, sleeping in after his late night planning the withdrawal, was initially unaware of these dramatic developments. General of Brigade Maximilien Foy, who was the first to become aware of the British crossing, requisitioned three battalions of the 17th Light Infantry, hurried them east and led an attack on the seminary at around 11:30 am. However, the seminary, manned and fortified, constituted a powerful defensive position. In addition, Wellesley was able to bring his artillery to bear from the garden of the Monastery of Serra do Pilar, firing shrapnel with great effect. Foy was wounded and his troops beaten back with heavy losses. Later in the day, reinforced by three more battalions, the French attacked again. By this time, however, three more British battalions from across the river had bolstered the force occupying the seminary and surrounding buildings, now in effect a fort, and the French were defeated again.

Soult was faced with an enemy force in a strongly fortified bridgehead, outflanking him to the east, threatening his line of retreat, and growing in strength all the time via a crossing route he could not disrupt. In order to reinforce Foy, in a desperate effort to retake the seminary before it was too late, he made a fateful decision. He transferred the troops which had been guarding the boats on the wharves of Ribeira in the centre of Porto to join the attack on the seminary, three quarters of a mile to the east. This proved disastrous. As soon as the French troops had marched away from the riverside, the people of Porto liberated their boats there and set out across the river in "anything that would float" to the wharves of Vila Nova de Gaia on the south bank. From there they ferried the waiting British troops back across the Douro in large numbers, into the heart of Porto. Four British battalions crossed immediately and, advancing in the direction of the seminary, attacked the French from the rear. This clinched the battle. The French broke and the army embarked on a headlong retreat from Porto, heading in disorder along the road towards Valongo, to the north-east.

In order to cut off a French retreat, Major General John Murray's 2,900-man brigade, including the 14th Light Dragoons, had earlier been dispatched across the Douro at a ferry crossing five miles to the south-east of Porto, near Avintes. His force then marched north and reached a ridge looking down from the south onto the Valongo road, along which the retreating French army was being pursued north-eastwards by British infantry emerging from Porto. However, Murray seems to have considered his force too small to engage with a French force three to four times the size, even though it was retreating in disorder. He therefore remained on his ridge, failing to block the French escape route, or even to open fire on the retreating army. However, one squadron of the 14th Light Dragoons, a mere 150 men, did speed after the retreating French. Its command had been spontaneously appropriated by General Charles Stewart (Charles Vane, 3rd Marquess of Londonderry), a seasoned cavalry officer and Wellesley's adjutant-general, who had arrived shortly beforehand with messages from Wellesley to Murray. With Stewart at the head, the squadron charged the French rear-guard, which had formed up in a defensive position to meet them, but broke in the face of the charge. About 300 French prisoners were captured. From the British squadron, three of the four officers were wounded, 10 men killed and 11 severely wounded. Action was then broken off, and the French army was able to continue its retreat.

== Aftermath ==
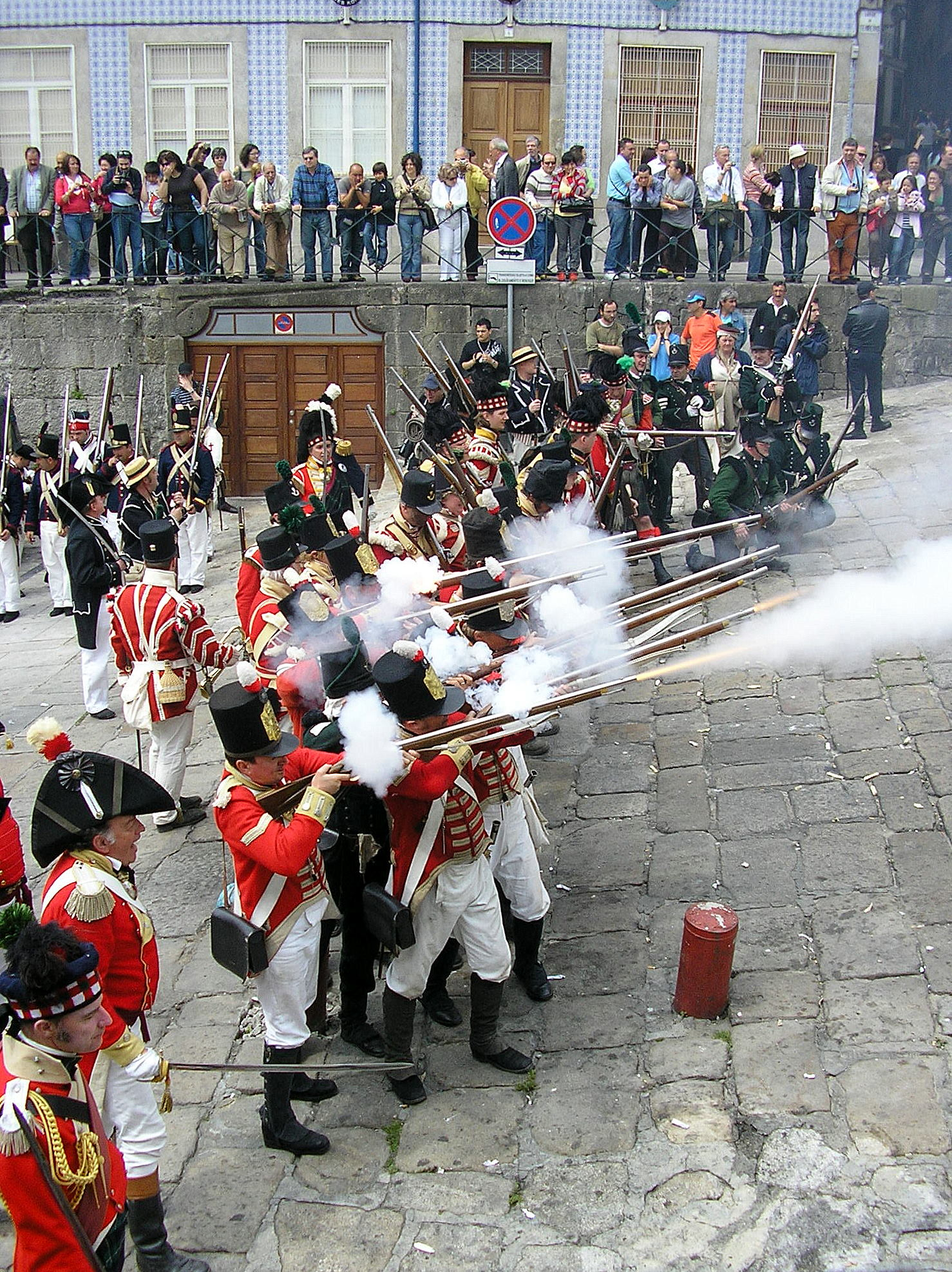
Reenactment of the battle in 2009

The British lost 125 men in all in the Second Battle of Porto. In the battle for the seminary, Wellesley's second-in-command, Major-General Edward Paget had his arm shattered by a French bullet and it had to be amputated. In addition to 1,800 men captured, the French suffered 600 killed or wounded, including Foy, who was injured. Due to Murray's error of judgement and the fact that the bulk of Wellesley's army were still on the other side of the Douro in Vila Nova de Gaia, the French escaped on 12 May. However, Loison failed to clear Silveira's force away from Soult's planned path of retreat to the northeast, so Soult was compelled to abandon all his equipment and take footpaths over the hills to further to the west. Soult's and Loison's forces eventually met at Guimarães.

Marching by a more direct route, the British reached Braga (northwest of Guimarães) before the French, which forced Soult to adjust his route of retreat back in a more easterly/north-easterly direction. Meanwhile, Beresford and Silveira were manoeuvring to block Soult's escape route in that direction. After escaping from several tight spots, Soult slipped away over the mountains, eventually reaching the safety of Ourense in Spain. During the retreat, Soult's corps lost 4,500 men, its military chest and all of its 58 guns and baggage. He entered Spain with a much diminished force, roughly half the size it had been before the Second Battle of Porto.

The guerilla war proceeded till the end of the Peninsular war. The Spanish conventional warfare proceeded till the end of the Peninsular war. Napoleon had ended his invasion of Spain with the occupation of Madrid. The Second Portuguese campaign had ended with the French retreat out of Portugal. The Spanish campaign in late 1809 started with the Battle of Talavera with the British army back in Spain. In recognition of his victories at Porto and Talavera, Sir Arthur Wellesley was appointed Baron Douro of Wellesley.

== In fiction ==
The battle of Porto is depicted by Bernard Cornwell in Sharpe's Havoc, Simon Scarrow in Fire and Sword, Allan Mallinson in An Act of Courage, Iain Gale in Keane's Company and by Martin McDowell in the historical novel The Plains of Talavera.

Preceded by Battle of Grijó	Napoleonic Wars; Second Battle of Porto	Succeeded by Battle of Wörgl
