= Battle of Grijó =

1809 battle during the Peninsular War

- Part of the Peninsular War
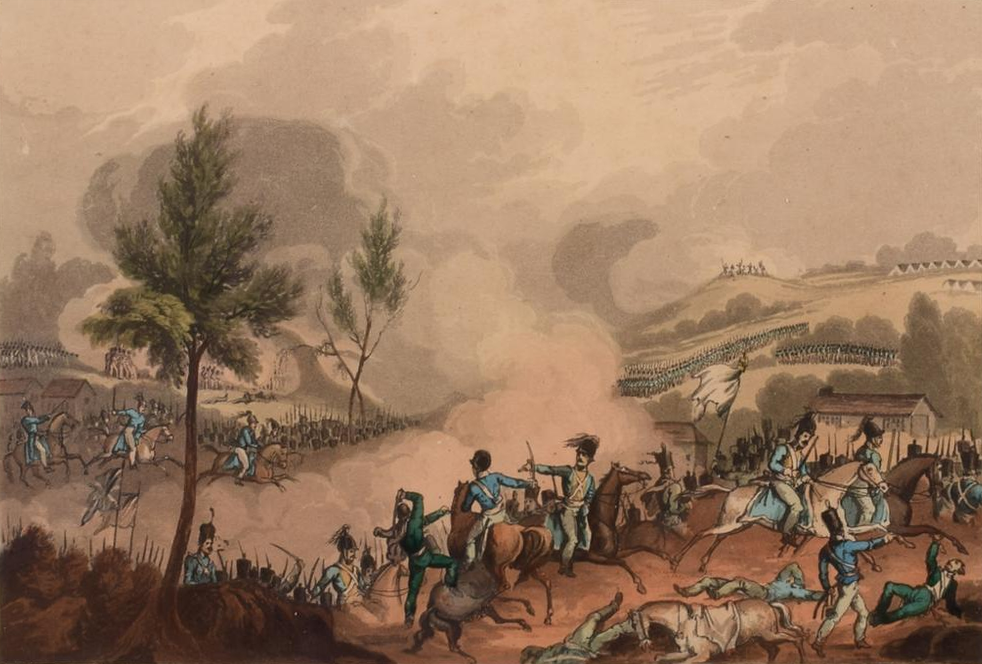
- Illustration of the battle
Date	10–11 May 1809
Location	Grijó, Portugal 41°01′42″N 8°34′49″W
Result	Anglo-Portuguese victory

Belligerents
(United Kingdom of Great Britain and Ireland) British Empire; Portugal	(First French Empire) France

Commanders and leaders
(United Kingdom of Great Britain and Ireland) Arthur Wellesley (United Kingdom of Great Britain and Ireland) Stapleton Cotton (United Kingdom of Great Britain and Ireland) Edward Paget (United Kingdom of Great Britain and Ireland) Rowland Hill	(First French Empire) Jean de Soult (First French Empire) Julien Mermet

Strength
18,000	7,000

Casualties and losses
104	200 hundreds of prisoners

Peninsular war: Portugal
1807 1808 1809 1810 1811

The Battle of Grijó (Portuguese pronunciation: [ɡɾiˈʒɔ]) (10–11 May 1809) ended in victory for the Anglo-Portuguese Army commanded by Lieutenant-General Sir Arthur Wellesley (the future 1st Duke of Wellington) over the French army commanded by Marshal Nicolas Soult during the Second French invasion of Portugal in the Peninsular War. The next day, Wellesley drove Soult from Porto in the Second Battle of Porto.

== Background ==
The Second Portuguese campaign started with the Battle of Braga.

== Battle ==
On 10 May, British Cavalry under the command of General Stapleton Cotton came into contact with outlying French Forces, after a short engagement they were scattered, both sides only suffering light casualties, but many French prisoners were taken.

The following day, on the 10th, a larger force commanded by General Julien Mermet defended the forested ridge, south of Grijo. the Anglo-allied forces under the command of Sir Arthur Wellesley (later Duke of Wellington) attacked them from the south, using a double flanking maneuver to threaten and drive them back.

In "The History of the Rifle Brigade", Willoughby Verner describes how the ad hoc 1st Battalion of Detachments, made from soldiers and officers of multiple regiments who had become stranded with the evacuation of Coruna, fought for the first time near the village of Grijó (Vila Nova de Gaia):

The infantry of the advance guard consisted of the Rifle Company of the 1st Battalion of Detachments, the Companies of the 43rd and 52nd Light Infantry, and the Light Company of the 29th Regiment of Foot, the whole under the command of Major Way of the 29th. Cotton with the British Cavalry came in touch with the French at dawn on the 10th, but Major-General Michel Francheschi had some infantry with him and Stewart's brigade was delayed and did not come for some time; Francheschi thereupon fell back and joined General Julien Mermet at Grijó. On the 11th, Wellesley ordered Major-General Hill to endeavor to outflank Mermet's position on the east whilst he with Major-General Paget's Division advanced. In the afternoon, the Light Companies of the 1st Battalion of Detachments attacked Mermet but met with a stiff resistance and lost not a few. Wellesley now ordered the King's German Legion to turn the French left and the 16th Portuguese to turn their right and with the rest of Stewart's Brigade renewed the attack on the wooded heights in the centre above the village of Grijó. Mermet thereupon withdrew... (Note: General "Michel Francheschi" is usually spelt "Michel Franceschi") (Note: The source is not clear if this Charles William Stewart's Brigade of dragoons or Richard Stewart's Brigade of Infantry . According to Glover, the 1st Battalion of Detachments belonged to Brig-Gen Richard Stewart's brigade.)

== Aftermath ==
The Second Portuguese campaign proceeded with the Second Battle of Porto.

== Notes ==
Preceded by Battle of Piave River (1809)	Napoleonic Wars; Battle of Grijó	Succeeded by Second Battle of Porto
