= Antonio de Castro =

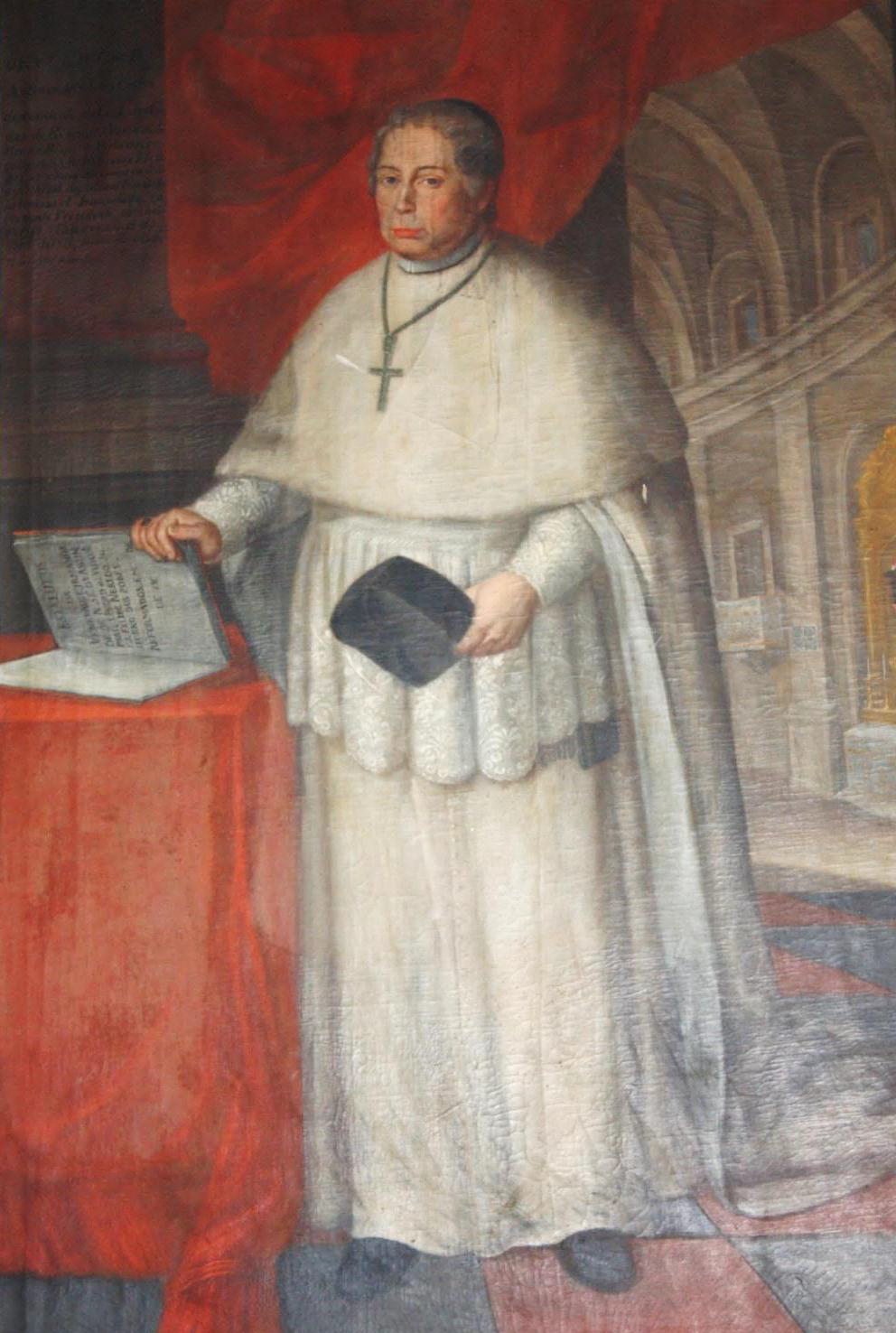
Antonio de Castro, Bishop of Porto, Patriarch of Lisbon, and Governor of Portugal during the Transfer of the Portuguese Court to Brazil

António de São José de Castro (1741 — 1814) was a Bishop of Porto, Patriarch of Lisbon, and Governor of Portugal during the Transfer of the Portuguese court to Brazil following Napoleon's Invasion of Portugal (1807).

== Peninsular War ==
When news of the Dos de Mayo Uprising in Spain reached Porto on 6 June 1808, the Spanish General Belesta, then commander of the garrison of 6,000 Spanish troops, arrested the French governor, General of Division Quesnel, together with his 75-man escort and, after proclaiming the independence of Portugal, marched his Division, together with his prisoners, back north to Galicia to join the Spanish forces fighting the French in Spain.

Although the neighbouring towns and districts had already risen against the French, between the 9th and 12 June, it would not be until the 18th, when the false report that a French column was drawing near Oporto so angered the population that they threw the Portuguese military governor, Oliveira da Costa, and many other people, into prison and set up a Supreme Junta of the Kingdom, with the Bishop of Oporto, Castro, at its head, the other local juntas of Northern Portugal uniting in recognizing his authority.

Under Castro's auspices, the Supreme Junta started putting together an army by reconstructing some of the old regular battalions that had been dismissed by the French, and within seven weeks had raised 5,000 properly equipped men in regular corps. They also brought together a militia of some 12,000 to 15,000 peasants, armed with pikes and scythes.

When Wellesley landed at Porto to interview the Bishop and the Supreme Junta, they had only been able to arm 5,000 infantry and 300 cavalry, under the command of Bernardim Freire de Andrade at Coimbra, and 1,500 men more for the garrison at Porto.

The regular troops raised at Porto would, the following August, see action at the battles of Roliça and Vimeiro as part of the troops under General Arthur Wellesley (who later became the Duke of Wellington).

Although the bishop was advised on military matters by the two envoys sent him by the British government, Friedrich von der Decken and Baron Eben, he chose to ignore their advice as well as that of the Portuguese generals in his district.

At Wellesley's insistence, the Bishop would later be included among the members of Portugal's re-constituted Council of Regency.

It was the Bishop's letter of protest to British officials against the terms of the Convention of Cintra, by which Junot's French troops were allowed to abandon Portugal, that first alerted the British public to what was considered outrageous terms, and by the time Dalrymple's dispatch of 3 September, containing the official communication of the terms reached Britain, it was already being condemned, with both Byron and Wordsworth later lamenting it, and which would eventually lead King George III to set up a Court of Inquiry, in November 1808.
