= Siege of Chaves =

1809 siege during the Peninsular War

- Part of the Peninsular War
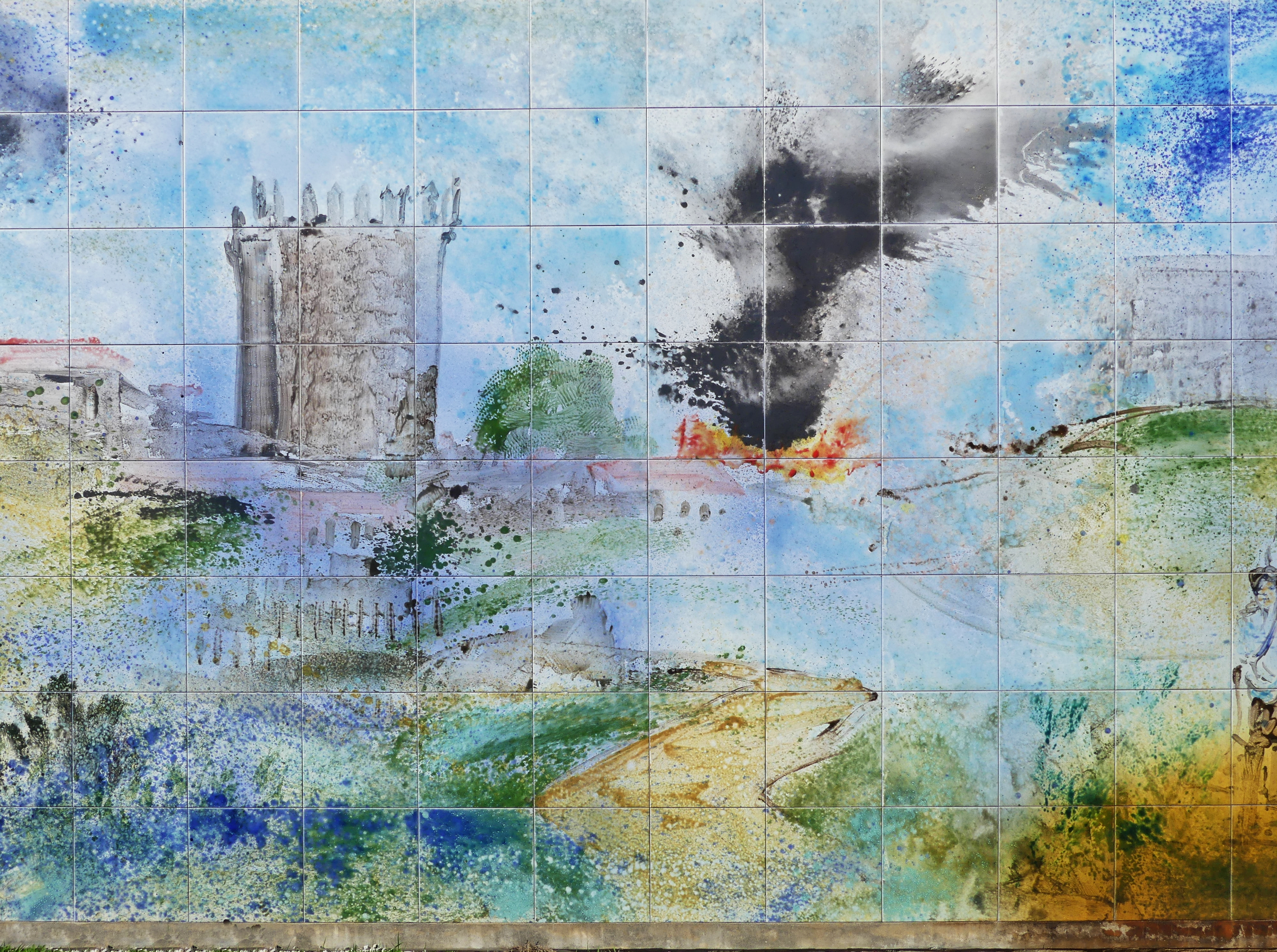
- Monument to commemorate the recapture of Chaves by the Portuguese forces.
Date	First siege: 10 to 12 March 1809; Second siege: 21 to 25 March 1809
Location	Chaves, Portugal 41°44′39″N 7°28′19″W
Result	French victory (1st); Portuguese victory (2nd)

Belligerents
Portugal	(France) French Empire

Commanders and leaders
First siege: Francisco Pizarro; Second siege: Francisco Silveira	First siege: (France) Marshal Soult; Second siege: (France) Major Messeger

Strength
First siege: 3,500 men 50 cannons Second siege: 6,000 men	First siege: 23,000 men 50 cannons Second siege: 1,800 men 12 cannons

Casualties and losses
First siege: 3,500 men captured 50 cannons captured Second siege: 4 to 5 men killed	First siege: No casualties Second siege: 300 dead 1,500 captured 12 cannons captured More than 1,000 rifles captured

Peninsular war: Portugal
1807 1808 1809 1810 1811

The siege of Chaves refers to the French siege and capture of Fort São Francisco and the town of Chaves, Portugal from 10 to 12 March 1809, and the subsequent siege and recapture of the fort by Portuguese forces from 21 to 25 March 1809, during the second French invasion of Portugal in the Peninsular War.

== French invasions (1807-1811) ==
Portugal suffered three invasions by French forces during the Peninsular War. The northern region of Trás-os-Montes, as all the country, had succumbed to the Napoleonic regency of Jean-Andoche Junot. As soon as news came of the disembarkation of the British in Portuguese Estremadura, the rebellion broke out. Bragança, and soon after Chaves, proclaimed liberation.

Napoleon, worried about what was happening in Spain and upset with the failure of the expedition of his forces, decided to come personally to the Peninsula, in whose submission he would eventually invest 300,000 men. The British, who had disembarked in 1807 in Galicia under the command of General John Moore, did not surpass 30,000 in number. Napoleon ordered Jean-de-Dieu Soult to pursue the British in Galicia. Moore's army was defeated and hounded across the mountains of Lugo; the British general himself was killed during the final combats around the bay of Coruña, where the remnants of his forces re-embarked.

Several months later, Soult received orders to invade Portugal from the north and expel the British from Portuguese soil. The carrying out of order was, however, strongly impeded by the winter, which had made the Minho River almost impassable, and by the resistance of Portuguese forces located between Cerveira and Valença. Then General Soult decided to go around the mountainous border of the Upper Minho and cross the drywall of Trás-os-Montes. His forces numbered around 23,000 men (among them 4,000 on horse) and 50 artillery pieces. Some of these troops were experienced since they had participated in the battles of Friedland and Austerlitz. The border was crossed on 7 March 1809.

== Attack on Chaves ==
The defense of the border of Trás-os-Montes was in the hands of brigadier Francisco Silveira, whose forces, numbering 2,800 regular troops, 2,500 militia, and only 50 cavalry, were concentrated around the stronghold of Chaves. The fortifications, which were in bad conditions, were protected by 50 pieces of artillery, but with only a few of them fit for service, they were commanded by Lieutenant Colonel Francisco Pizarro. After initial skirmishes near the border, the Portuguese forces retreated to Chaves, and then Silveira ordered the stronghold to be abandoned.

This decision caused great unrest among the militias and the population. Prudently, the brigadier led his forces south, avoiding any risk against the superior forces. Pressured by the people and the militias, Lieutenant Colonel Francisco Pizarro disobeyed orders and accepted the command of the popular forces, preparing to resist the invading forces with 500 troops (1st line), 2,000 militia (2nd line) and 1,200 ordenanças (3rd line). Silveira tried to change his mind, even calling a war council to discuss the problem, but he couldn't get a formal decision, especially since the French who arrived on the 10th of March were now preparing to attack the more northerly fort of São Neutel. Pizarro held his ground, and the future count left with his officers to join his forces, who had occupied the highlands south of Chaves.

Soult summoned Chaves's stronghold to surrender, but no answer was given. But soon, it was evident in the fort that defense was useless. Although fire from the artillery and muskets persisted since the French arrival, the defenders ultimately recognized that Silveira's retreat was the most sensible one. Soult sent a second message calling for the surrender of the stronghold, and it was accepted on 12 March. Chaves surrendered, and the French troops marched into the town on 13 March. Soult, with so many prisoners on his hands, released the civilians of the militias and ordenanças, under oath of not taking up arms against the French and tried to recruit 500 of the line troops, who soon deserted. These actions by Marshal Soult were strongly criticized by several of his officers, especially those who had participated in the first French invasion of Portugal of the previous year under Junot, as they preferred that the stronghold had been taken by assault and the garrison put to the sword.

This wise and gentle proceeding was much blamed by some of his officers, especially those who had served under Junot. They desired that Chaves might be assaulted and the garrison put to the sword, for they were embued with a personal hatred of the Portuguese and, being adverse to serve in the present expedition, endeavored, as it would appear, to thwart their general (...). (Napier, 1828.)

== Portuguese counterattack ==
Meanwhile, the Portuguese forces had left their positions near Vidago and retreated farther south to a low pass between Vila Pouca and Vila Real. Soult, though, had decided to make his way south by way of the Barroso, due west instead of south. He left a small garrison of a few hundred men in Chaves under the command of Major Messenger, and the hospital he had transferred from Monterey, Galicia, with many wounded or sick. As soon as Silveira knew that the main French army had gone away, he decided to attack Chaves. For some days, a French detachment had approached Vila Pouca to force the entrenched Portuguese forces to retreat. But soon, it was discovered that these forces had gone to Boticas to join up with the main French army already on its way west. Soult's army went on to win the First Battle of Porto.

Once again, Silveira entered the Tâmega River valley and attacked the Chaves stronghold on 21 March. The small French garrison tried to resist, but the Portuguese knew the town well and could penetrate the walls through the "Opening of the Butchershops." There was hand-to-hand combat in the streets, and the French, leaving almost 300 dead, retreated into the São Francisco Fort. Some 200 French fell prisoners into the hands of the Portuguese. The Portuguese, having no artillery, blockaded the French for four days. On the fifth day, when all was ready for the final assault to be carried out by escalating the fort, Silveira gave Messenger an ultimatum, under which he should surrender without conditions. Messenger then requested an hour of truce to take a decision. After the time given had ended, and still without a response, Silveira issued a final request, warning Messenger that if he did not surrender in five minutes, he would give orders to storm the fort. The French commander immediately surrendered without conditions. 25 officers, 23 civilians and surgeons, and about 1,300 soldiers were captured and escorted to Vila Real. The 114 Spanish left in Chaves as prisoners by Soult were restored to liberty.

This skillful maneuver by Silveira seriously upset Soult's plans, obliging him to wait, for lack of supply lines, between the Douro and the Vouga. After the Second Battle of Porto, the French army was obliged by Wellesley to retreat quickly to its starting point, the city of Ourense in Galicia, Spain. In the final phase of this retreat, Silveira could almost intercept the French troops near Montealegre. Some of his detachments even saw the rearguard crossing the border near the rugged mountains of Larouco. Beresford had come up to Chaves and let the opportunity to destroy the French slip away. Once the danger had passed, Beresford, under the insistence of Silveira, called a court martial for Francisco Pizarro. This War Council occurred in Lisbon in 1809 and found the reckless lieutenant colonel innocent of the charges.

This successful defeat of the French by the poorly equipped Portuguese army gave the town of Chaves an essential place in Portuguese history. It, together with the defeat of pro-Royalist forces in 1912, gave Chaves the deserved title of the Heroic City of Chaves (Cidade Heróica de Chaves), the name of many streets and avenues in Portugal.

== See also ==
- History of Portugal
- John VI of Portugal
- Napoleonic Wars
- Timeline of the Peninsular War
- Transfer of the Portuguese Court to Brazil
