= French invasions of Portugal =

- Part of Peninsular War
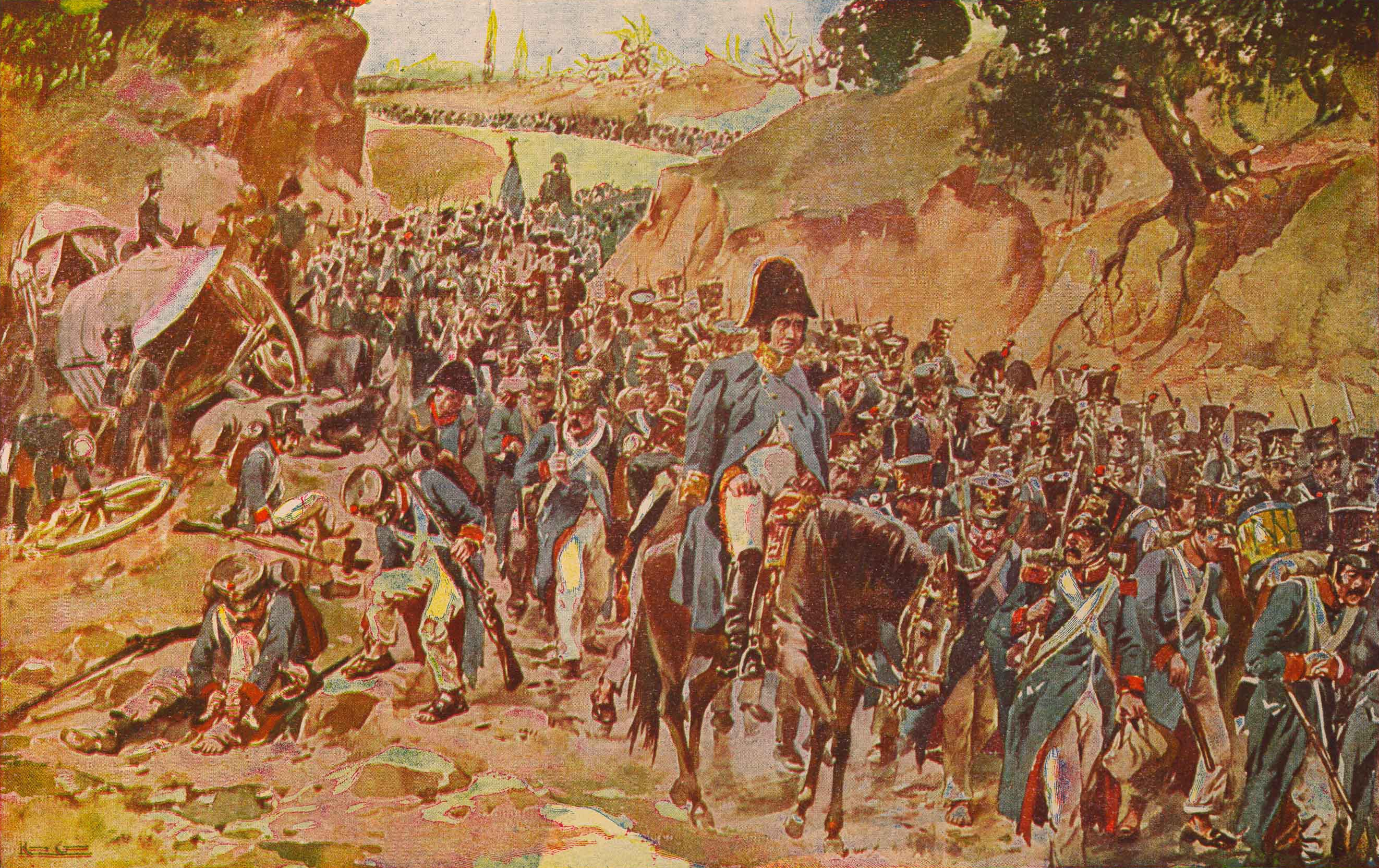
- The First French Invasion; Alfredo Roque Gameiro, 1917
Date	1807 – 1811
Location	Portugal
Result	Anglo-Portuguese victory

Belligerents
First French Empire	Kingdom of Portugal (United Kingdom of Great Britain and Ireland) British Empire

The French invasions of Portugal were a series of military campaigns between 1807 and 1810 as part of the Peninsular War. They include:

- Invasion of Portugal (1807)
- Second French invasion of Portugal
- Third French invasion of Portugal
