= Armand Lebrun de La Houssaye =

French general

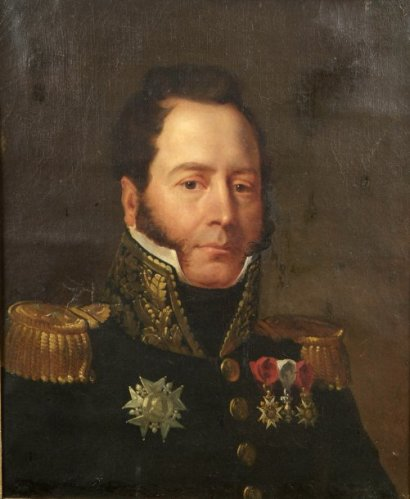
- Armand Lebrun de La Houssaye
- Born: 20 October 1768; Paris, France
- Died: 19 June 1848 (aged 79); Paris, France
- Military career
- Allegiance: France
- Branch: Cavalry
- Service years: 1791–1833
- Rank: General of Division
- Conflicts: War of the First Coalition; Battle of Kaiserslautern; War of the Third Coalition; Battle of Austerlitz; War of the Fourth Coalition; Battle of Eylau; Battle of Heilsberg; Battle of Friedland; Peninsular War; Battle of Corunna; Battle of Braga; First Battle of Porto; Second Battle of Porto; Battle of Arzobispo; French invasion of Russia; Battle of Borodino (WIA)
- Awards: Légion d'Honneur, CC, 1804
- Other work: Baron of the Empire, 1808

Armand Lebrun de la Houssaye (French pronunciation: [aʁmɑ̃ ləbʁœ̃ də la usɛ]; 20 October 1768 – 19 June 1848) led a cavalry division during the First French Empire of Napoleon. He joined the army of the French First Republic in 1791 and fought at Kaiserslautern in 1793. He was appointed to lead a hussar regiment the following year. Promoted to general officer in 1804, he led a heavy cavalry brigade at Austerlitz, Eylau, and Heilsberg and a division at Friedland. Transferred to Spain, he commanded a dragoon division under Marshal Nicolas Soult at Corunna, Braga, First and Second Porto, and Arzobispo in 1809. In 1812 he led a cavalry division in the III Cavalry Corps during the French invasion of Russia where he was badly wounded at Borodino. While recovering in the hospital, he was captured by the Russians and held until the peace in 1814. Lahoussaye is one of the names inscribed under the Arc de Triomphe on Column 6.

== Life in Utrecht ==
When he came to Utrecht (NL) to recover, he fell in love with his neighbor's daughter, Charlotte Juliana Vossenberg. They were married on May 11, 1797. They had one daughter, Carolina Julia (1798–1876) who was baptised Evangelical Lutheran.
