= Ponte do Prado =

Bridge of Prado Ponte do Prado
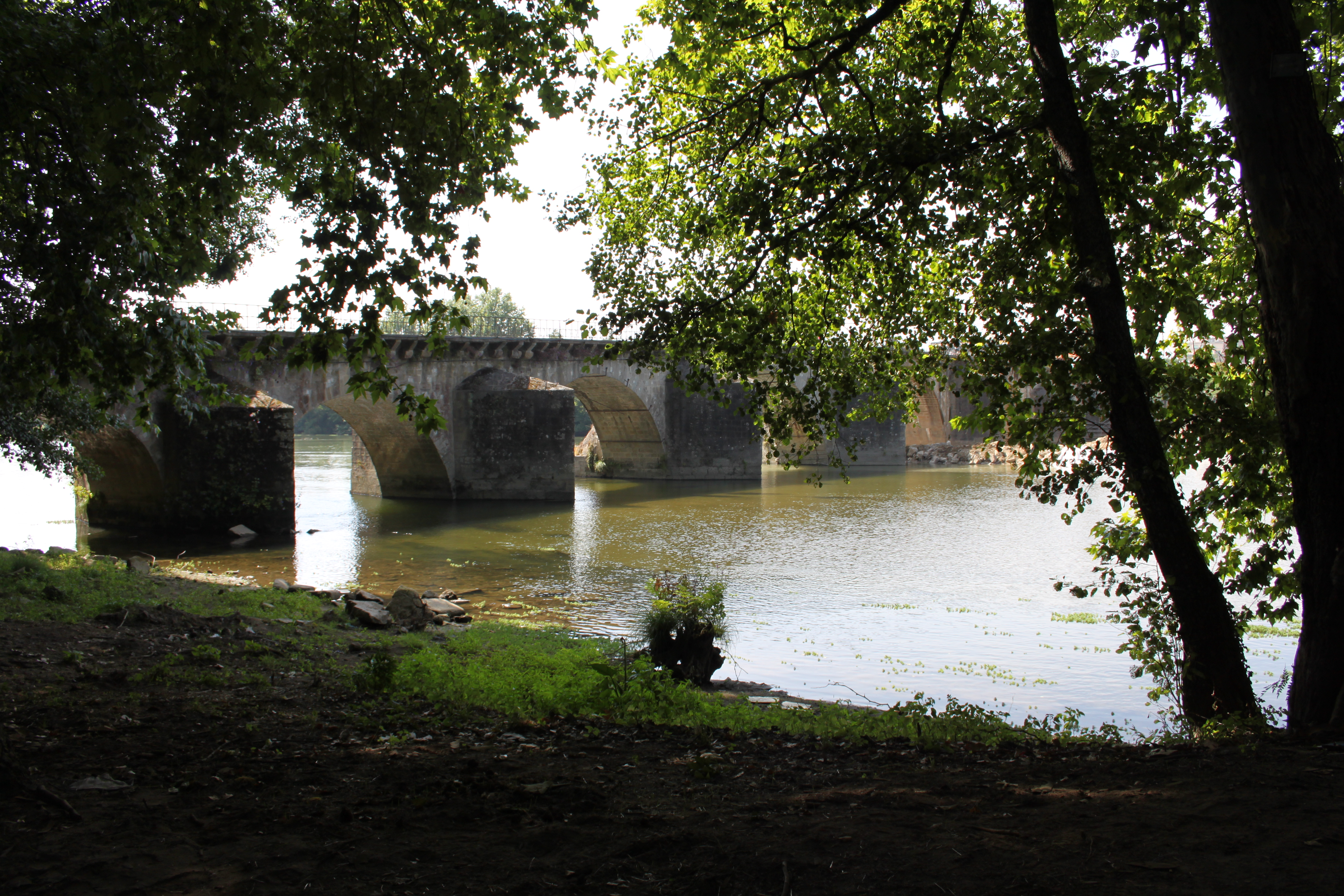
- The Prado Bridge over the Cávado River, showing its medieval character
- Coordinates: 41°35′45″N 8°27′46″W
- Locale: Braga, Cávado, Norte, Portugal
- Official name: Ponte do Prado, sobre o Cávado
- Named for: Vila de Prado

Characteristics
- Design: Bridge

History
- Constructed by: unknown
- Built: 1st century A.D.

The Bridge of Prado (Portuguese: Ponte do Prado) is a bridge constructed over the Cávado River, in the civil parish of Vila de Prado, municipality of Vila Verde, in Norte Region, Portugal northern Portugal. Although originally a Roman bridge, it was re-constructed during the 16th century when the original had been destroyed following flooding and consistent use. There are few vestiges of the Roman bridge.

== History ==
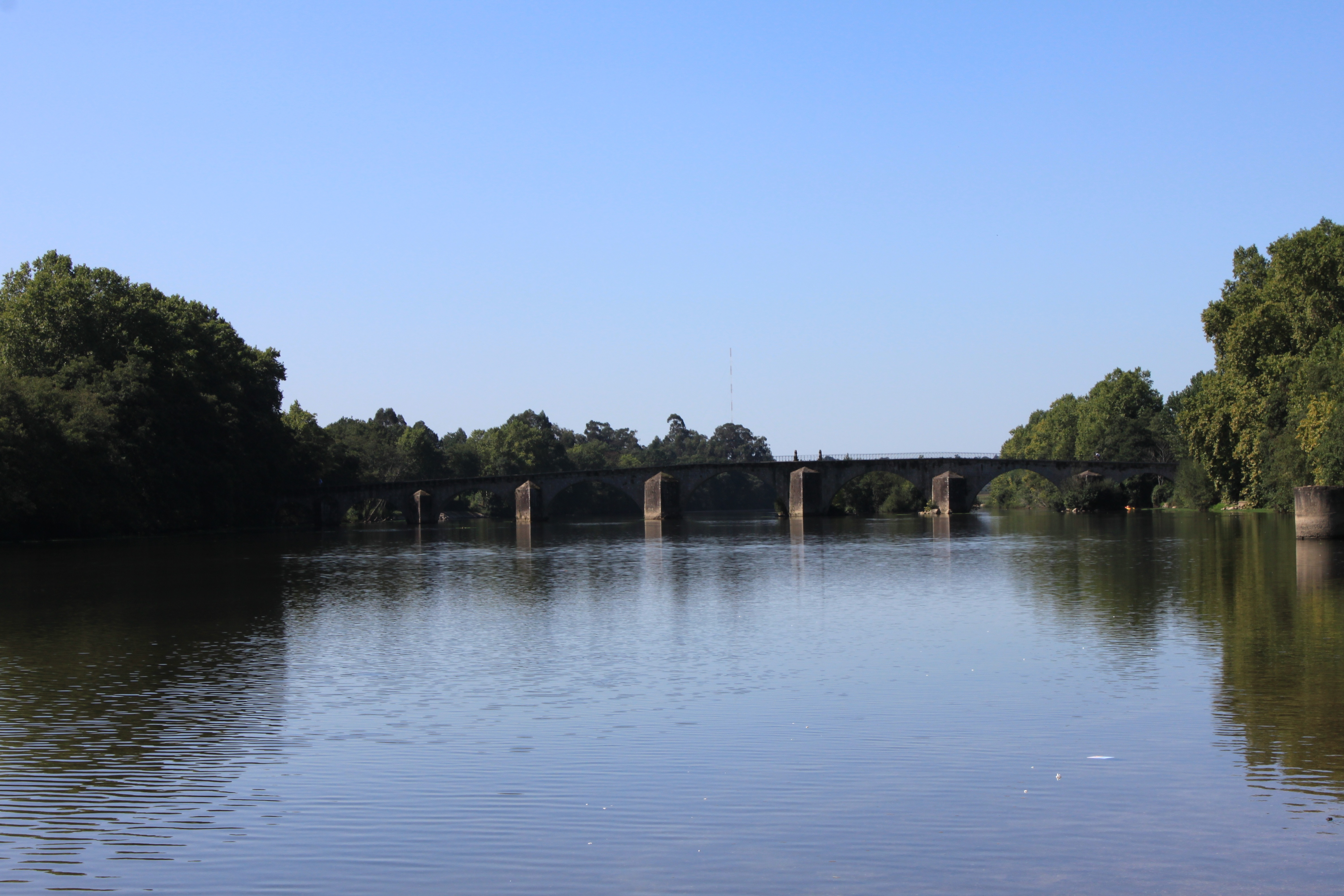
The shallow cantilever bridge over the Cávado River

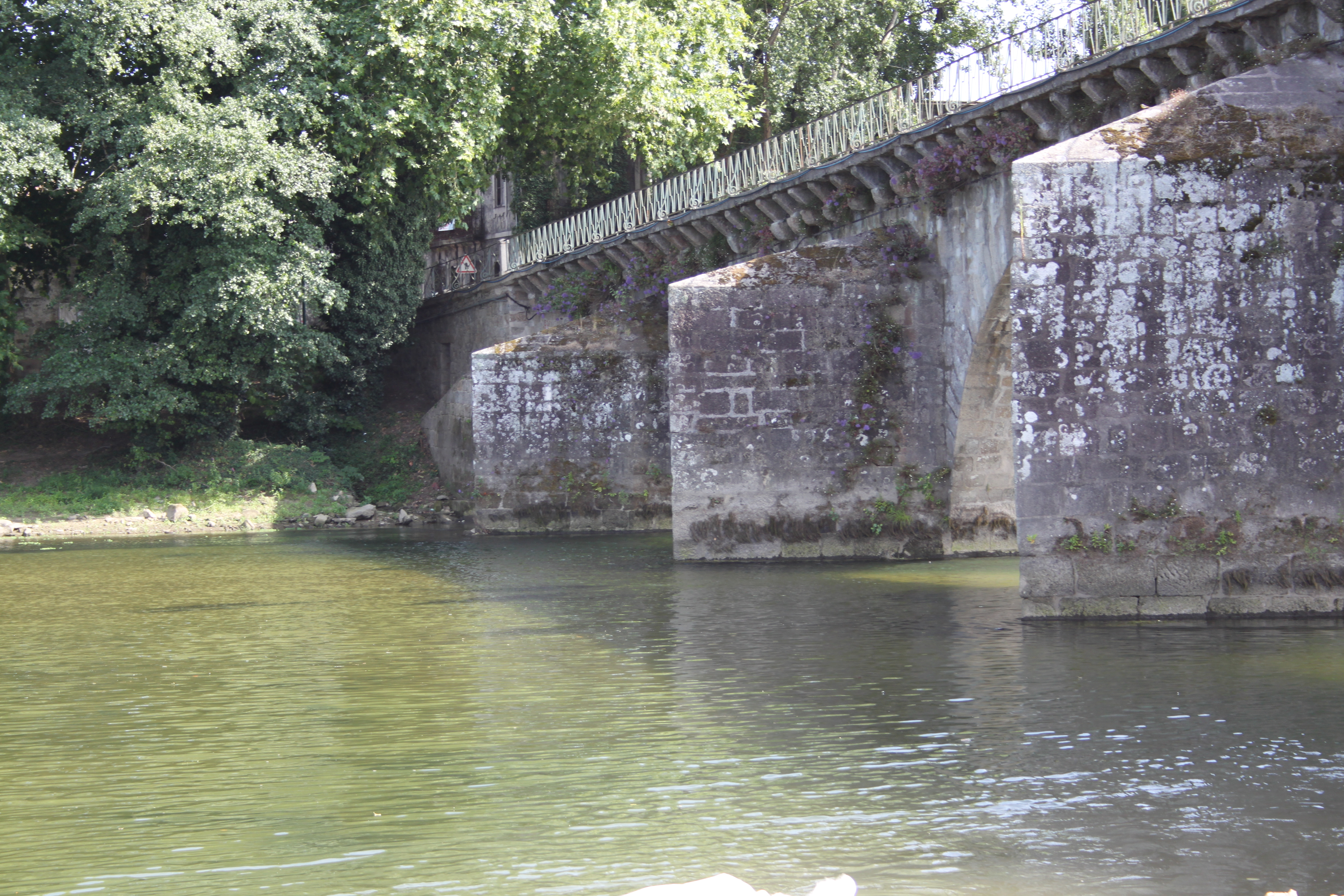
The reinforced abutments of the marginal edge of the bridge

During the Roman occupation of the Iberian Peninsula, there likely existed a bridge that integrated the Roman road between Bracara Augusta (Braga) and Asturica Augusta (Astorga), passing through Ponte de Lima to the northeast territories around Tui. Between 1118 and 1128, the Archbishop Paio Mendes donated goods to the Templar Hospital in Braga, with the condition that two-thirds of their products should be used in the construction of the Ponte de Prado bridge.

The Prado Bridge was one of the more important points in the geographic landscape of the medieval territory of Entre-Douro-e-Minho. Its appearance reflects various reconstructions that occurred during the Middle Ages and modern eras, supporting its importance along the centuries. During the Middle Ages, the Roman roads continued to be used (and in many cases they were the only access between points in existence). Within this context, the Prado Bridge was the object of attention. Between the religious center of Braga and one of the oldest towns in the country (Ponte de Lima), the Prado continued to link the north and southern territories. A legend persists that the Leonese king, in order to rendezvous with a maiden he was enamoured with, ordered that the bridge be maintained and its statute reinforced during the medieval period.

In 1260, King Afonso III of Portugal conceded a foral (charter) to the town of Prado, initiating a period of growth and importance, with its elevation to the status of municipality. This development was reinforced in 1510, when the foral was confirmed by King Manuel I of Portugal. In the proceeding centuries, the area around the bridge developed into a regional center that eventually drew the eye of the Crown, especially in an intense post-1580 Portuguese succession crisis reorganization.

Yet, in the same year, flooding resulted in the demolition of the original bridge. In 1616 it was reconstructed completely. At the same time, on the central platform two ashlar granite bunks were constructed with decorated inscriptions. It was under the supervision of António de Castro (during the Philippine Dynasty) that the bridge received its current appearance, which likely eliminated any vestiges of the medieval construction. The memory of this period was marked by an inscription on the bridge, alongside the coats-of-arms for the Philippine monarchs and the Counts of Prado; the architect inscribed his name: António de Castro de a vila de Vianna.

The recent history of this bridge has been turbulent; although there has been a need to restore the bridge, many of the projects were delayed, owing to financial issues or political problems. In 1963 and 1976, owing to threats of destruction and the consequences of constant traffic, the Junta Autónoma de Estradas (Autonomous Corporation for Roads) completed projects to consolidate and substitute the pavement on the road. More recently, the Instituto de Estradas de Portugal (Portuguese Institute of Roads), which was the predecessor of Estradas de Portugal, was responsible for cleaning the main pillars.

== Architecture ==
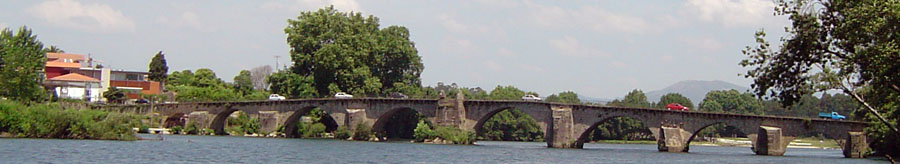
A panorama of the Ponte do Prado linking Braga and Vila de Prado)

The bridge is located in an urban area, crossing the Cávado River, integrated into the EN201 motorway. The bridge's exit (to the north) fronts the Praça do Conselheiro Sousa Lima, a gardened area, the site of a 16th-century pillory marking Prado's historical importance as a municipality until the 19th century.

The flat-top shallow cantilever bridge consists of nine Roman arches that progressively increase in size the closer to the centre of the span, with the three largest arches slightly peaked. Eight triangularabutments protect the base of the bridge from debris, while polygonal structures downstream act as reinforcements.

Located on the left of the central arch and elevated to the level of the surface pavement is a rectangular platform. On this space, there are two decorated structures to commemorate the construction of the bridge, in the form of a seat with backrest, with a central coat of arms on the southern face. Representing the symbol of the Counts of Prado, there is an inscription:

EMQO AN / TO TI / V ER / ES DIA / SM IRA / POR TIS / EPR VDE / NT EAS / ICO MO / PA GA / LA PO / NTE SEPA / GALAVIDABEVEME / NT E

Translated from the Portuguese as "While you have days look to yourself, if you are prudent, as you pay the bridge, you pay with your life shortly". On the northern face of the backrest is a royal coat of arms, with the inscription:

ESTA OBRA FES ANTONI / O DE CRASTO DA VILA DE VIAN / A / 16 / 76

Stating that the project was completed by António de Crasto from the town of Viana (in 1676).

On the left margin is a rectangular space to facilitate passage over the bridge. Also part of this project was the erection of a cross, dedicated to the Senhor da Ponte (Our Lord of the Bridge) on the northern margin, but that did not survive to this day.

The pavement is constituted from rectangular blocks, delimited by a paved walkway resting on corbels which allow the passage of pedestrians and by wrought iron guards paced by stone pillars.

In the archway soffit there are various abbreviations, such as in the first arch (M, z, y, /, ///) and on the second arch various created from vertical lines.

== See also ==
- List of bridges in Portugal
