= Pierre Hugues Victoire Merle =

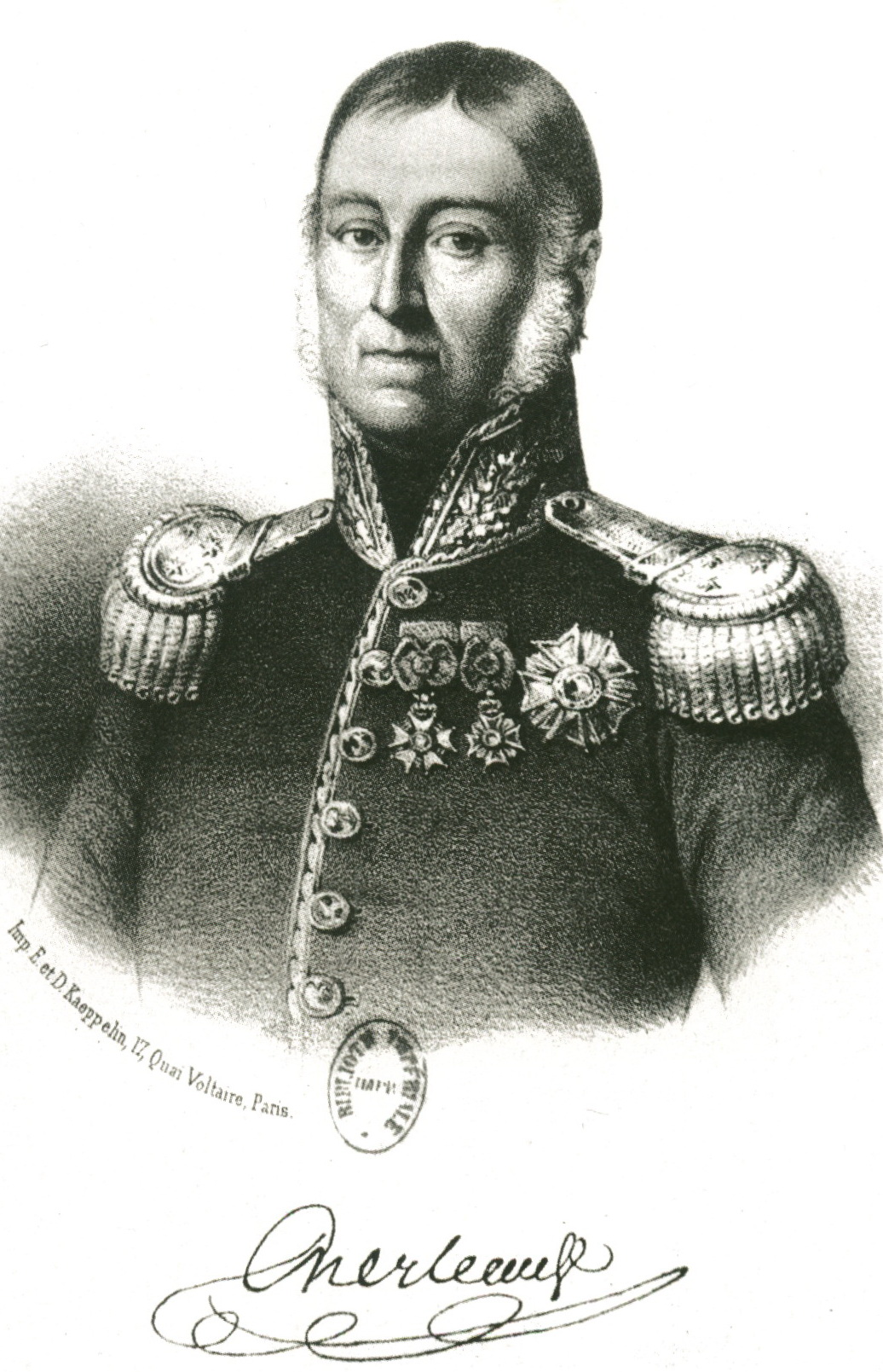
- Born: 26 August 1766; Montreuil-sur-Mer, France
- Died: 5 December 1830 (aged 64); Marseille, France
- Military career
- Allegiance: France
- Branch: Infantry
- Service years: 1781–1816
- Rank: General of Division
- Conflicts: War of the First Coalition; War of the Pyrenees; War of the Third Coalition; Battle of Austerlitz; Peninsular War; Battle of Medina de Rioseco; Battle of Corunna; First Battle of Porto; Second Battle of Porto; Battle of Bussaco; Battle of Sabugal; Battle of Fuentes de Oñoro; First Battle of Polotsk; Second Battle of Polotsk
- Awards: Légion d'Honneur, GC, 1808
- Other work: Baron of the Empire, 1808

Pierre Hugues Victoire Merle (French pronunciation: [pjɛʁ yɡ viktwaʁ mɛʁl]; 26 August 1766 – 5 December 1830) was a French general during the First French Empire of Napoleon. He joined the French army as a private in 1781 but after the French Revolution, the pace of promotion quickened. He was appointed a general officer in 1794 for distinguishing himself during the War of the Pyrenees. After leading a brigade at Austerlitz in December 1805, he was promoted again. His division was in the first wave of the 1808 invasion of Spain, which precipitated the Peninsular War. In Spain, he led his division at Medina de Rioseco, Corunna, First and Second Porto, Bussaco, Sabugal, and Fuentes de Oñoro. After being sent home from Spain, Merle was assigned to lead a division in the French invasion of Russia. He led his troops at First and Second Polotsk. He embraced the Bourbon cause in 1814, retired from the army in 1816, and died at Marseille in 1830. Merle is one of the names inscribed under the Arc de Triomphe on Column 35.
