= Julien Augustin Joseph Mermet =

French military general (1772–1837)

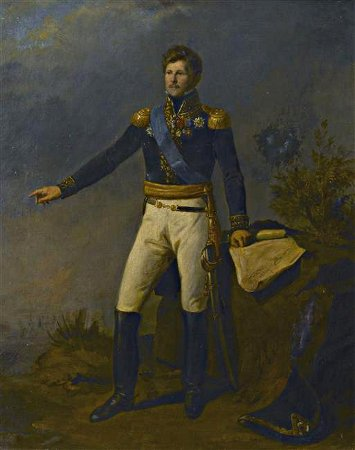
Julien Augustin Joseph Mermet

General Julien Augustin Joseph Mermet (French: [ʒyljɛ̃ oɡystɛ̃ ʒozɛf mɛʁmɛ]; 9 May 1772, Le Quesnoy – 28 October 1837, Paris) was a French army general. He fought in the Napoleonic Wars as a division commander in Italy and in the Peninsular War.

== Empire ==
Mermet commanded a dragoon division in Marshal André Masséna's army during the 1805 Italian campaign. In 1806, still commanding his cavalry division (23rd, 29th and 30th Dragoon Regiments), he was present at the siege and capture of the fortress of Gaeta, on the west coast of Italy.

During the second French invasion of Portugal in 1809, Mermet led a division under Marshal Nicolas Soult. He fought at the First Battle of Porto on 28 March and the Battle of Grijó on 11 May. Before the Second Battle of Porto his unit was sent away to guard Soult's artillery and baggage. Mermet led his infantry division at the Battle of Serem at Vouga and Marnel Rivers.

In the third French invasion of Portugal, Mermet commanded the 2nd Division in Marshal Michel Ney's VI Corps. He fought at the sieges of Ciudad Rodrigo and Almeida, the Battle of the Côa and the Battle of Bussaco in 1810. During the retreat from Portugal, Mermet participated in actions at Redinha and Foz de Arouce as part of Ney's rear guard.

Mermet led his division in Maj-General Louis Loison's VI Corps at the Battle of Fuentes de Onoro in May 1811. At the Battle of Vitoria in June 1813, he led a light cavalry division in Maj-Gen Honoré Reille's Army of Portugal.
