= Baron Eben =

Prussian military officer

Christian Adolph Frederick Eben (1773–1825), better known as Baron Eben, was a Prussian military officer.

== Early career ==
Having reached the rank of captain in Prussian Service, Eben transferred to British Service as a captain in the York Hussars (1801). In 1803, he was a captain in the 10th Light Dragoons, a rank he maintained in the 11th Foot in 1806. That same year he was promoted to Major in Froberg's Levy, a rank he maintained when he transferred to Roll's Regiment in 1807.

== Peninsular War ==
Eben was given the command of the 2nd battalion of the Loyal Lusitanian Legion, (Note: The Legion had been raised by Sir Robert Wilson towards the end of 1808 and was intended to form "the core of a subsidiary Portuguese division in British pay, distinct from the national army." (Oman, 1903, p. 199.)) and then sent by the Bishop of Porto, the leading figure of Porto's Junta, to reinforce Bernardino Freire de Andrade's troops and militia at Braga. (Note: This was contrary to the original orders given Eben, which were, as the 2nd Battalion of Wilson's Legion, and having been unable to advance with Wilson from Porto for lack of uniforms and arms, to join him at Almeida as soon as possible. Wilson was thus deprived of half his proper force. (Oman, 1903, footnote 300.))

When the latter fled Braga and was brought back to the camp by the Ordenanza militia, Eben had him thrown into jail. Members of the Ordenanza later returned, dragged Freire out, and killed him in the street with their pikes. As second-in-command to Freire, Eben then took command of the Portuguese forces that would be heavily defeated by Soult's troops at the battle a few days later.

At the end of that month, with the remnants of his battalion, Eben again fought as part of the Portuguese forces at First Battle of Porto (March 1809).

With his battalion forming part of General Leith's 5th Division, Eben fought at Bussaco (September 1810).

At the end of October 1810, he commanded some 2,000 troops of the 7th brigade, incorporated in Campbell's 6th Division that made up Wellington's army within the Lines of Torres Vedras.

In 1811, Eben was promoted to lieutenant-colonel in Roll's Regiment. and fought at Fuentes de Oñoro (May 1811). In 1813, he served as a commander of the Portuguese militia in the province of Tras-os-Montes.

== Post-war career ==
Eben was involved in a conspiracy against the Portuguese Government in 1817 for which he was dismissed from the army and exiled from Portugal.

He later became a brigadier general in the service of the Republic of Columbia (1821-1822).
