= Bernardim Freire de Andrade =

Portuguese Arny general (1759–1809)

Bernardino Freire
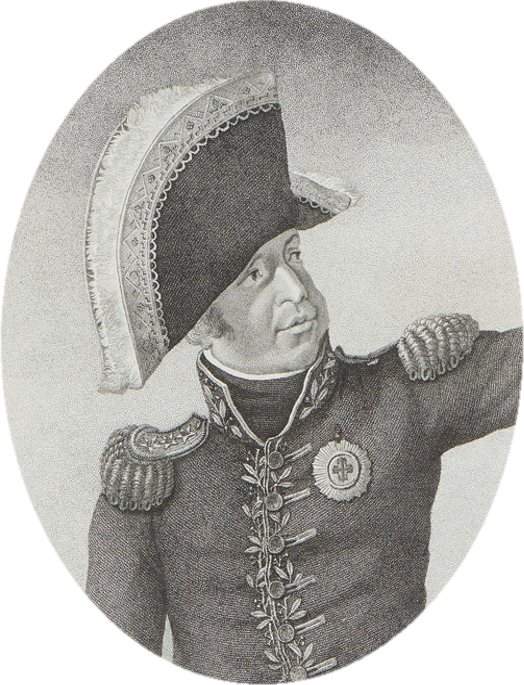
- Born: 18 February 1759; Lisbon, Portugal
- Died: 17 March 1809 (aged 50); Braga, Portugal
- Military career
- Allegiance: Portugal
- Service years: 1781–1809
- Rank: Field Marshal
- Conflicts: War of the Pyrenees; War of the Oranges; Peninsular War

Bernardino Freire de Andrade e Castro (Lisbon, 18 February 1759 – Braga, 17 March 1809) was a Portuguese Army general officer who was appointed, in July 1808, commander-in-chief of the Portuguese forces in the north of the country during the Peninsular War.

== Early career ==
=== War of the Pyrenees ===
Freire saw action in the Roussillon in 1794-1795.

== Peninsular War ==
In July 1808, the Supreme Junta of Oporto appointed Freire commander-in-chief of the Portuguese forces in the north of the country.

Highly critical of the Convention of Cintra (August 1808), by which Junot's French forces were allowed to leave Portugal after their defeat at Vimeiro by the Anglo-Portuguese forces commanded by Sir Arthur Wellesley, Freire was also resentful of British influence in the country.

Freire died at Braga, lynched by a mob. Having secretly fled from Braga, he had been seized by the Ordenanza of Tobossa, and brought back to the camp as a prisoner. His second-in-command, Baron Eben, the colonel of the 2nd battalion of the Lusitanian Legion, had then thrown him into the jail of Braga. Members of the Ordenanza later returned, dragged Freire out, and killed him in the street with their pikes. That same day, they also murdered Major Villasboas, the chief of Freire’s engineers, and one or more of his aides-de-camp.

The commander of the British invasion force, Sir Arthur Wellesley complained that it was difficult to cooperate with Freire.

== Promotions and Units ==
Rank	Unit	Date
Lieutenant General		2 October 1808
Commandant Chief	Army of Operations in Estremadura	22 July 1808
Field Marshal		25 February 1807
Governor of Weapons	Porto Party	25 February 1807
Brigadier		25 January 1795
Colonel	13th Infantry Regiment of Peniche	17 December 1794
Lieutenant Colonel	13th Infantry Regiment of Peniche	24 September 1791
Major	13th Infantry Regiment of Peniche	27 April 1790
Captain	5th Company, 13th Infantry Regiment of Peniche	27 February 1787
Lieutenant	5th Company, 13th Infantry Regiment of Peniche	9 October 1782
Ensign	5th Company, 13th Infantry Regiment of Peniche	25 April 1782
Cadet	13th Infantry Regiment of Peniche	
