= Jean Baptiste Marie Franceschi-Delonne =

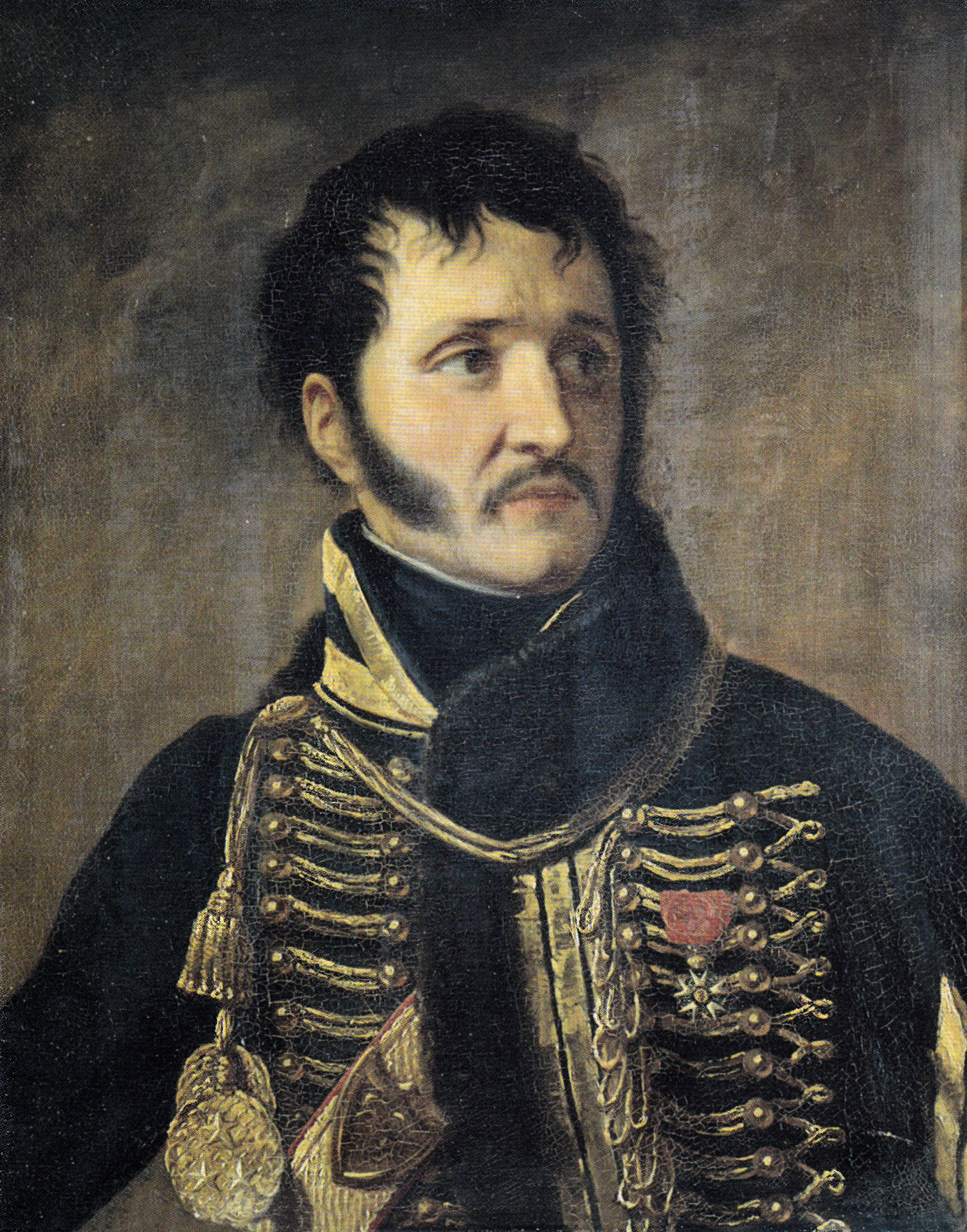
General Jean-Baptiste Marie Franceschi-Delonne

Baron Jean Baptiste Marie Franceschi-Delonne (1767 – 23 October 1810) was a French General who served throughout the Revolutionary campaign on the Rhine, took part in the campaign of Zurich in 1799, and distinguished himself very greatly by his escape from, and subsequent return to, Genoa, when in 1800 Masséna was closely besieged in that city. He became a cavalry colonel in 1803, was promoted general of brigade on the field of Austerlitz, and served in southern Italy and in Spain on the staff of King Joseph Bonaparte. During the Peninsular War he won great distinction as a cavalry general, and in 1810 Napoleon made him a baron. He was a prisoner in the hands of the Spaniards, into whose hands he had fallen while bearing important despatches during the campaign of Talavera. He was harshly treated by his captors, and died at Cartagena on 23 October 1810. His name is included on L'arc de Triomphe.
