= Cabezon =

Cabezón is the Spanish word for "stubborn" or "big-headed". In Chile, cabezon means intelligent. Cabezon or cabezón may refer to:

== Fish species ==
- Cabezon (fish) (Scorpaenichthys marmoratus), a species of fish in the family Cottidae
- Cachorrito cabezon, a species of fish in the family Cyprinodontidae

== People ==
=== Surname ===
- Antonio de Cabezón (1510–1566), Spanish composer
- Isaías Cabezón (1891–1963), Chilean artist and member of Grupo Montparnasse
- José Ignacio Cabezón, American Buddhist scholar and translator, and editor of the Journal of the International Association of Tibetan Studies
- Francisco Javier Sánchez Cabezón, bishop of the Roman Catholic Diocese of Astorga

=== Nickname ===
- Omar Sívori (1935–2005), Argentine football forward nicknamed El Cabezón
- Oscar Ruggeri (born 1962), Argentine football player nicknamed El Cabezón
- Andrés D'Alessandro (born 1981), Argentine football player nicknamed El Cabezón
- José Froilán González, Argentine racing driver nicknamed El Cabezón

== Places ==
- Cabezón de Pisuerga, a Spanish municipality of Castile and León
- Cabezón de Valderaduey, a Spanish municipality of Castile and León
- Cabezón de la Sierra, a Spanish municipality of Castile and León
- Cabezón de Cameros, a Spanish municipality of La Rioja
- Cabezón de Liébana, a Spanish municipality of Cantabria
- Cabezón de la Sal, a Spanish municipality of Cantabria
- Cabazon Indian Reservation in California, United States
- El Cabezón, an area in Jalisco, Mexico; see Area codes in Mexico by code (300-399)
- Cabezon, New Mexico, a ghost town in the US
- Cabezon Peak, a volcanic neck in New Mexico

== Other ==
- Cabezon, a song by Red House Painters
- USS Cabezon (SS-334), American submarine
- Cabezón, a character in children's book Gorgorín e Cabezón (1992) by Uxío Novoneyra
- Battle of Cabezón, a small event in 1808, part of the Peninsular War

== See also ==
- Cabazon
- Cabezones, an Argentine hardcore-alternative rock band
