= Cigales (wine) =

Coordinates: 41°46′0″N 4°42′0″W

Cigales DOP
- Wine region
- Cigales DOP in the province of Valladolid in the region of Castile and León
- Official name: D.O. Cigales
- Type: Denominación de Origen Protegida (DOP)
- Year established: 1991
- Country: Spain
- Size of planted vineyards: 1,948 hectares (4,814 acres)
- No. of wineries: 34
- Wine produced: 38,358 hectolitres
- Comments: Data for 2016 / 2017

Cigales is a Spanish Denominación de Origen Protegida (DOP) for wines located to the north of Valladolid (Castile and León, Spain) along both banks of the River Pisuerga.

It includes several municipalities, including Valladolid itself, Dueñas, Cabezón de Pisuerga, Cigales, Corcos del Valle, Cubillas de Santa Marta, Fuensaldaña, Mucientes, Quintanilla de Trigueros, San Martín de Valvení, Trigueros del Valle and Valoria la Buena. The DO has an extension of 574 km² and is at an altitude of 750 m above sea level. It is a relatively recent DO, having been created in 1991.

== History ==
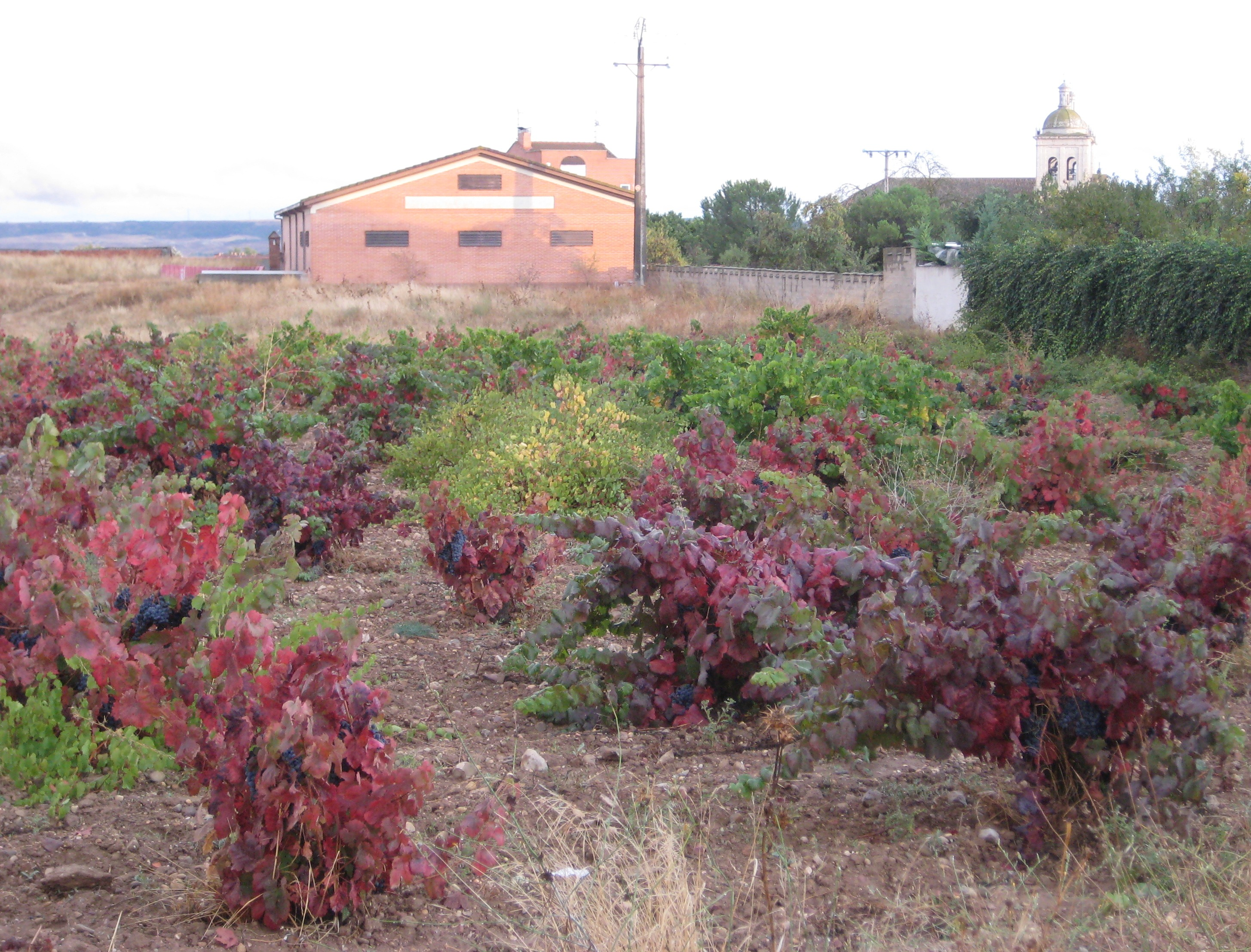
Vineyard in Cigales, Valladolid, Spain.

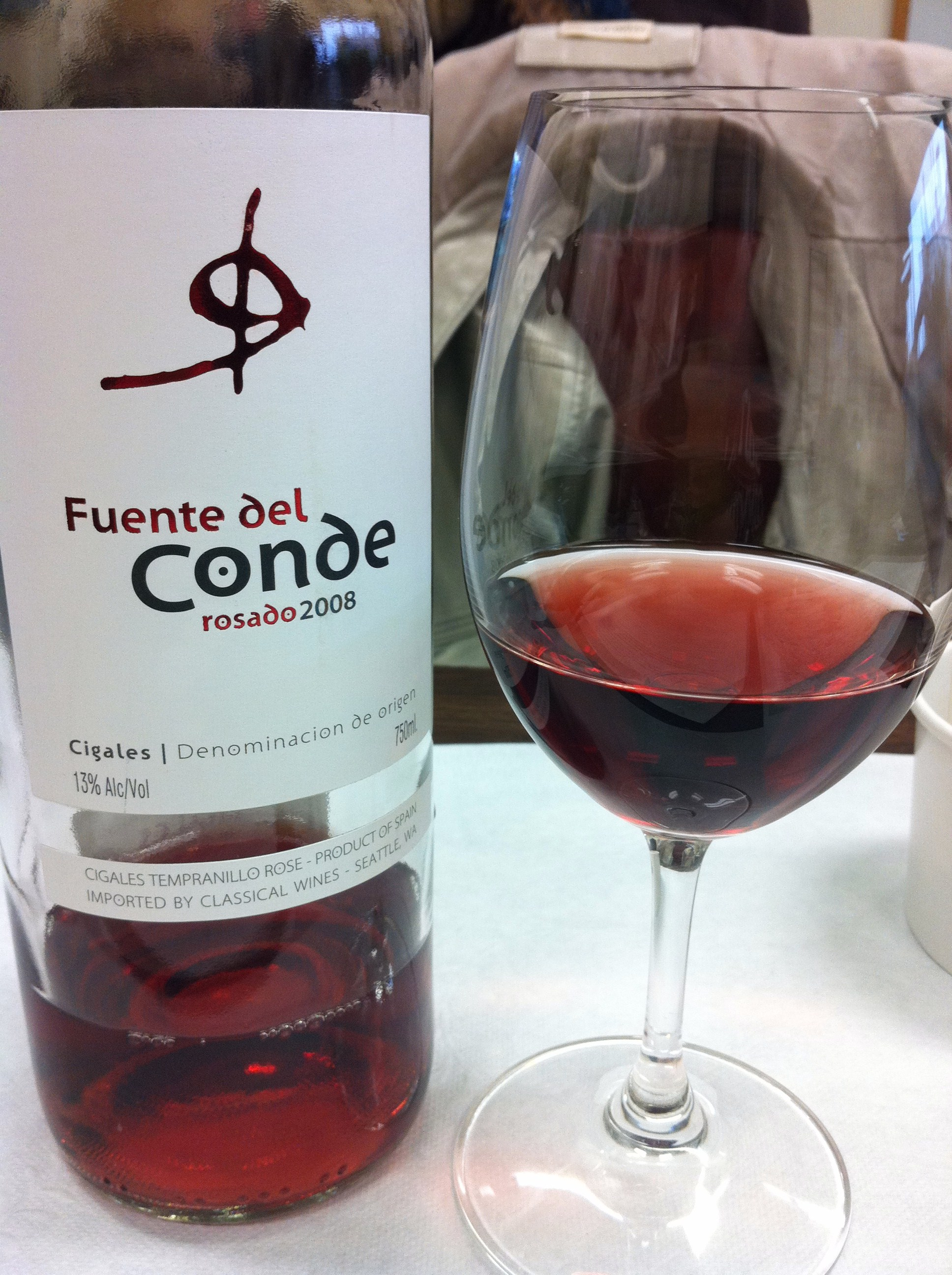
A rosado from the Cigales region.

The first known inhabitants of this area were the Vaccaei, who were subjugated by the ancient Romans in the 2nd century BC. As in the rest of the peninsula, the Romans introduced vines along with other agricultural innovations. The number of vineyards increased significantly during the Middle Ages due to the influence of the monasteries.

Mary of Austria, Queen of Hungary, died in Cigales in 1558, whereas her grandniece Anna, the future Queen of Spain was born there.

== Climate ==
The Cigales DOP has a continental climate (long hot summers, cold winters) with an Atlantic maritime influence and strong temperature variations. Temperatures often fall below 0°C during the winter and there are usually frosts in spring, which represents a significant risk for the grape harvest, and can reach 40°C in summer. Rainfall is light, about 425 mm per annum, falling mostly in spring and autumn.

== Soil ==
The soil is light brown in color and is formed by lime-bearing sand and gypsum-bearing clays, lying on a subsoil of clays and marls. Its structure is granular, weak, not very rocky and lacking in organic material.

== Wines produced ==
Like other DOPs in the region, Cigales supplied Valladolid and other cities with wine during the Middle Ages. While Toro supplied red wine and Rueda white wine, Cigales specialised in claretes and rosés. These wines were made until recently in underground cellars, which were often shared by small wine-makers (bodegueros) and which were excavated to depths of over 10 m.

== Authorized grape varieties ==
- Red grapes: Tempranillo, Garnacha tinta, Cabernet Sauvignon, Syrah, and Merlot.
- White grapes: Verdejo, Albillo, and Sauvignon Blanc.

== See also ==
- Cuisine of the province of Valladolid
- Spanish wine
