= Juan Martín Díez =

Spanish military leader and guerrilla fighter

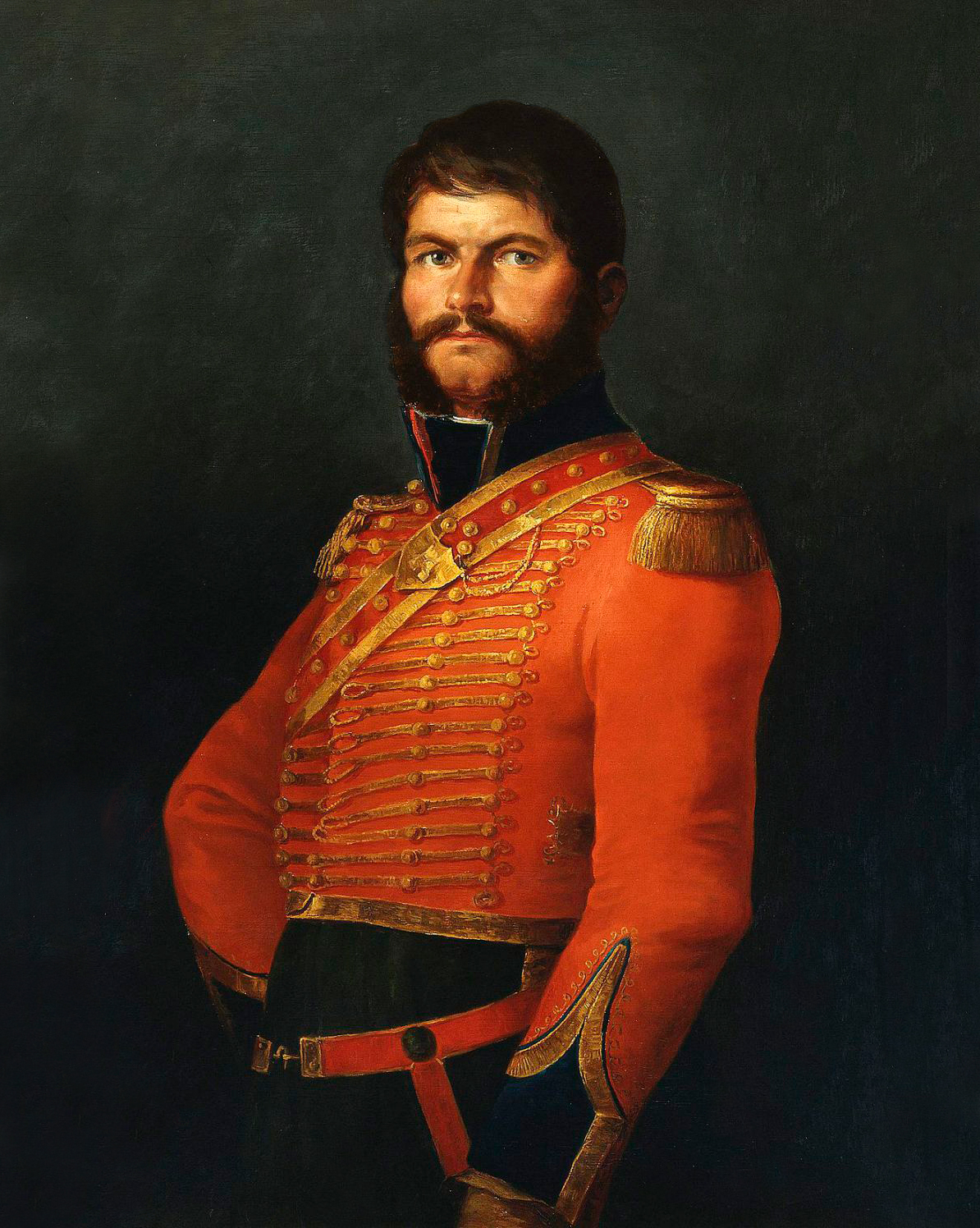
- Replica of Goya's, by Martínez Cubells
- Born: 5 September 1775; Castrillo de Duero, Spain
- Died: 20 August 1825 (aged 49); Roa de Duero, Spain
- Military career
- Allegiance: Spain
- Branch: Spanish Army
- Service years: 1793–1825
- Rank: Captain general
- Nicknames: "El empecinado" (The undaunted)
- Conflicts: War of the Pyrenees; Peninsular War
- Awards: Laureate Cross of Saint Ferdinand

Juan Martín Díez, nicknamed El Empecinado (Spanish: the Undaunted), (5 September 1775 – 20 August 1825) was a Spanish military leader and guerrilla fighter, who fought in the Peninsular War.

On October 8, 1808, the privilege of using the name Empecinado was granted to Juan Martín Díez, not only for himself, but also all his descendants. His nickname has given the Spanish language the verb empecinar, meaning to persist or insist on achieving one's goals.

== Early life ==
Díez was born in Castrillo de Duero (Valladolid, Spain) on September 5, 1775. He was a farmer and his house still exists in its original location. Those from Castrillo are often termed "empecinados", a term which arises from several nearby streams filled with black mud (pecina) from stagnant, decomposing waters. It is believed that the local appellation was then applied to Díez, just like other guerrilleros were nicknamed after their trade.

Díez had military ambitions throughout his childhood. At 18, he participated in the Rosellón campaign of the War of the Pyrenees (1793–1795). The following two years were pivotal in his training in the art of war and began his hostile attitude towards the French.

In 1796, Díez married in Fuentecén, Burgos, and Díez settled in that town with his new bride. He farmed there until the occupation of Spain by Napoleon's army in 1808, whereupon he pledged to fight against the invaders. It is said that his decision to fight was spurred on when a woman in his town was raped by a French soldier; Díez afterwards killed the offender.

After the invasion, Díez organized a party of warriors composed of his friends and even members of his own family. At first, the conflict centered around the route between Madrid and Burgos. Later, he fought alongside the Spanish Army at the Cabezón de Pisuerga bridge in Valladolid and in Medina de Rioseco, Valladolid. The Spanish Army was routed in both of these battles.

== Military successes ==
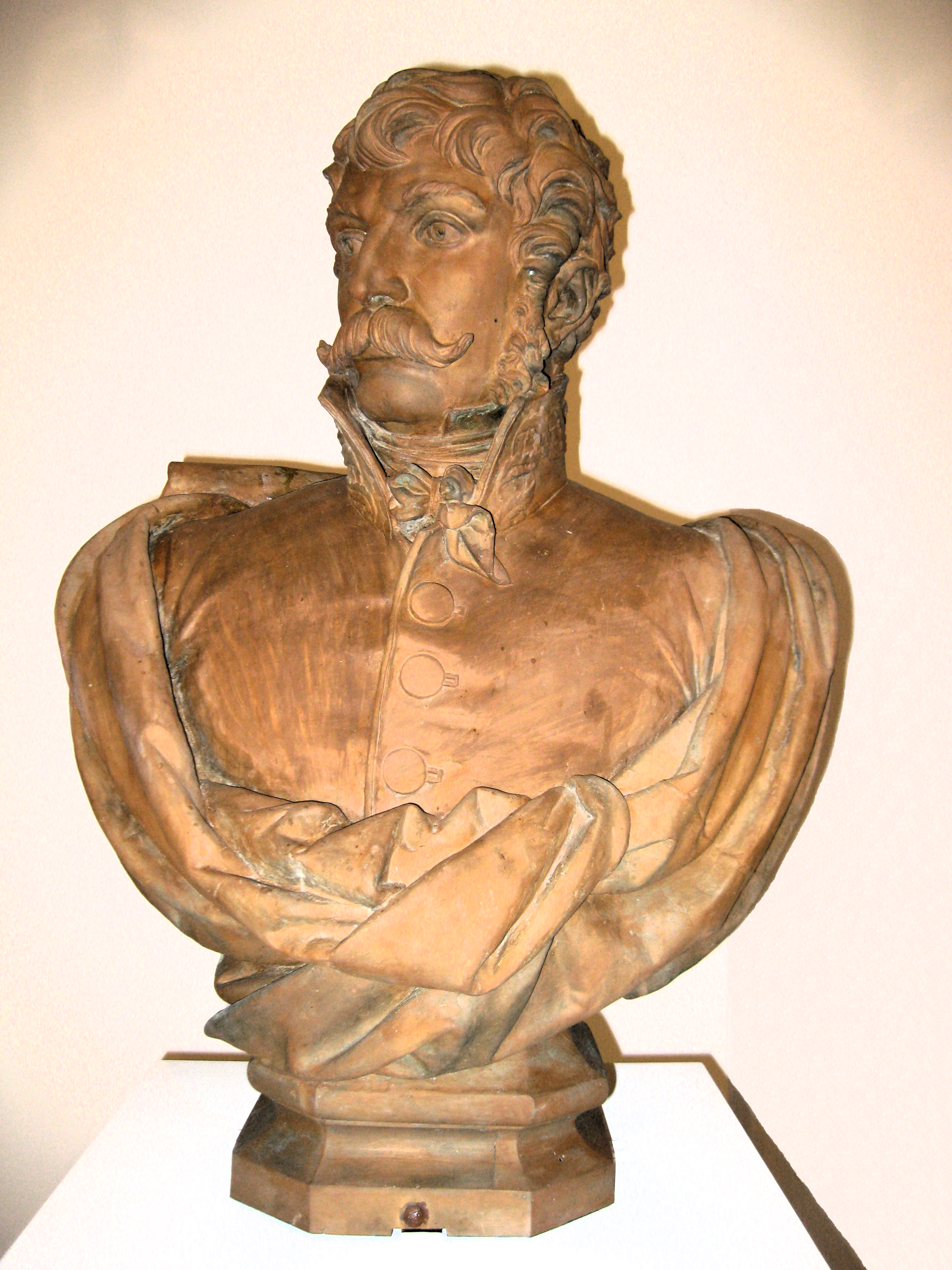
Bronze bust of Juan Martín Díez in Alcalá de Henares.

The Army's failures caused Díez to believe that he would have better results with a system of guerrilla warfare. Thus started his wartime success, in such places as Aranda de Duero, Sepúlveda, Pedraza, and throughout the Duero river basin.

In 1809 Díez was promoted to the rank of cavalry captain. During the spring of the same year, his field of action extended along the mountains in Gredos, Ávila, and Salamanca, and also in the provinces of Cuenca and Guadalajara.

The principal function of the guerrilla bands was to disrupt the supply and communication lines of the French army by intercepting the enemy's messages and by seizing convoys of supplies, money, and armaments. The damage to Napoleon's army was considerable, to such an extent that Joseph Léopold Sigisbert Hugo, a French general, was given the duty to "pursue exclusively" Díez and his guerrillas. Hugo, after trying unsuccessfully to capture Díez, opted instead to arrest Díez's mother and other members of his family. Díez, not to be cowed, had 100 French prisoners of war executed as retribution. His mother and family thereupon were released.

In 1810, Díez was forced to take refuge in the castle of the Salamancan city of Ciudad Rodrigo, which the French army besieged. In 1811, he was placed in command of a hussar regiment from Guadalajara, bringing his total force to some 6000 men.

On May 22, 1813, Díez assisted in the defense of Alcalá de Henares (Madrid), and on the Zulema bridge over the Henares river he and his army defeated a French force twice their size. Later, Fernando VII would approve the construction of a commemorative pyramid in Alcalá in honor of the victory, only to order its destruction in 1823, deriding it as a symbol of a "liberal". The people of Alcalá, however, raised another monument to the Empecinado in 1879; this monument survives to this day.

== Liberal revolution and decline ==
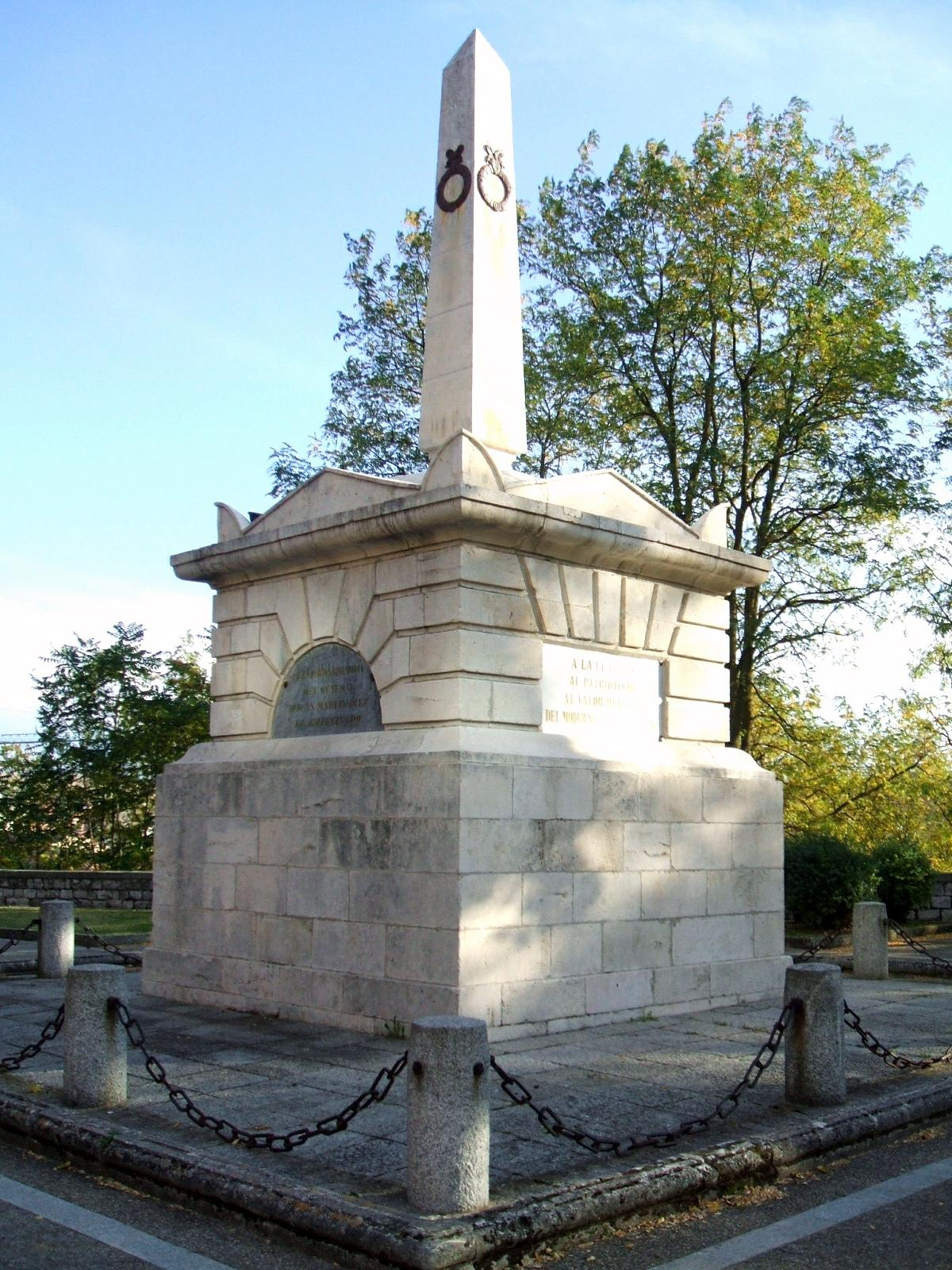
Memorial to Juan Martín Díez in Burgos.

When King Fernando VII returned to Spain and restored absolutism, he took measures against those he considered "liberal enemies", among them Díez, who was exiled to Valladolid. In 1820, the revolution of Rafael de Riego commenced, and Díez took up arms - but this time against Fernando VII's royal troops. During the following years, in the trienio liberal (Spanish: three-year period of liberal rule), he was named military governor of Zamora and occasionally Capitán General (General Captain).

In 1823, during the Absolutist Reaction, a French Army (the so-called Hundred Thousand Sons of St. Louis) invaded Spain to restore absolutism, the liberal regime fell, and Díez fled to Portugal. From there, he asked permission to return without danger of detainment, a request which was granted. But upon his return, he was arrested near Olmillos de Peñafiel and moved to Roa de Duero (Burgos) where he was turned over to the mayor, Gregorio González. He was there imprisoned and displayed in an iron-bar cage. Leopoldo O'Donnell, a liberal military leader, learned of Díez's situation and attempted to have Díez's case heard in a tribunal. The magistrate in Roa de Duero, however, had already ordered Díez's execution, which was carried out on August 20, 1825, in the central plaza of the village. Díez died, hanged in lieu of being shot. It is said that in an outburst of desperation and strength, Díez managed to take the sword from the official that accompanied him to the gallows.

== See also ==
- Guerrilla warfare in the Peninsular War
- Tío Camuñas
