= Camuñas =

- Municipality
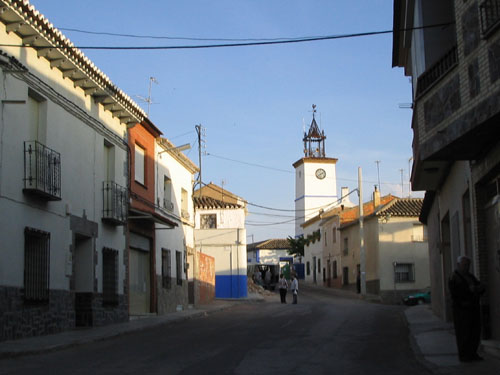
- Calle Imperial and the Clock Tower

- Coat of arms

- Location of Toledo within the Castile-La Mancha Camuñas (Castilla-La Mancha)
- Coordinates: 39°51′24″N 4°1′28″W
- Country: Spain
- Autonomous Community: Castile–La Mancha
- Province: Toledo

Government
  - Mayor: María Carmen Cano López (PSOE)

Area
  - Land: 102.03 km^{2} (39.39 sq mi)
- Elevation: 674 m (2,211 ft)

Population (2025-01-01)
  - Total: 1,742
- Postcodes: 45720
- Website: camunas.es

Camuñas is a municipality located in the province of Toledo, Castile-La Mancha, Spain. According to the 2018 census (INE), the municipality had a population of 1,740 inhabitants.

== Name ==
The noun "Camuñas" is said to come from the Arabic word kammuniya which has two meanings: one is "similar to cumin" and the other "all species of seed which is neither cereal nor legume". The name is probably taken as an anthropological nickname from the repopulator of the area during the Reconquista.

== Coat of arms ==
Mantle shield: 1st, gules, the eight-pointed cross of Saint John, silver 2nd, gold, the mask or gules mask with obits and sable lips; on the tablecloth, of azure, a cumin, of gold. At the buzzer, royal crown closed.

Entrusting its historical justification to Fernando Jiménez de Gregorio, the heraldist José Luis Ruz Márquez made the coat of arms described, representing with the cross the belonging of Camuñas to the order of Saint John, with the mask of the Corpus Christi of the town, and the cumin in allusion to their crops. Endorsed by the Royal Academy of History on June 22, 1983, it was approved by the Castilla-La Mancha Community Board in Decree No. 11, of March 18, 1986.

== Geography ==
The village is located in the hillside of the mountain Cabeza-gorda (literally fat head), in the left bank of Amarguillo river in La Mancha region. It borders with the villages of Puerto Lápice and Herencia, in the province of Ciudad Real, and Madridejos and Villafranca de los Caballeros, in the Toledo one.

The municipality consists on a wide meseta. The southern part is less plain, with precipices, gorges and mountains that reach 1,000 meters high. In the west can be found a meadow that reaches Amarguillo river, and the hill called Cañada de las Vacas, extended in both sides of the expressway autovía del Sur. In the right side of the road there is a hill in whose top there are three entrances to old mines, one of them of huge depth.

== History ==
There are signs of a Roman and later Arab settlement; among the archaeological remains have been found lamps, ceramics and some epigraphic tombstone. Hispano-Roman settlements have also been documented in the areas of Las Varas, Palio and Lerma, as well as in the place called Los Villares de Almaén with both Hispano-Roman and Arab presence.

After the Reconquista, its repopulation was carried out around 1276 by the Order of San Juan. Camuñas was just a small village that depended on Consuegra until the middle of the 16th century. On April 5, 1557, the privilege of villazgo was granted to it by Princess Joanna of Austria (governor of the kingdoms in the absence of her brother Philip II of Spain), with the municipality having to deliver to the public treasury 1having to deliver the municipality to the public treasury the amount of 1,059,500 maravedís. At that time Camuñas had 160 neighbors with about 800 inhabitants. Since the 18th century it has had San Nicasio as its patron saint.

At the beginning of the 19th century the French invasion of Spain took place, from which a movement against the invader arose in the form of guerrillas. The village has one of the main guerrilla leaders in La Mancha and all the center of Spain during the Peninsular War, Tío Camuñas.

Years later, Luis Villaseñor y López de la Oliva, a nobleman with liberal ideas became mayor of the town and had clashes with the church (even expelled the priest). During the First Spanish Republic, the Cantonal rebellion begins and cantons are formed in various parts of Spain, independent states voluntarily federated in the Spanish Federation. The most famous was the Canton of Cartagena, but this town also formed its own canton, the Canton of Camuñas, which fell apart a few days later, being an anecdotal event. The main reason of the creation of this canton is very linked to the conversion of most of the village to Protestantism by the Galician evangelical missionary Félix Moreno Astray, unique case within the archdiocese of Toledo. According to Menéndez Pelayo, their aim was "a kind of Geneva from La Mancha and smuggler".

== Economy ==
Its production is fundamentally agricultural, highlighting those of wine, oil and saffron with denominación de origen (DO) "La Mancha", "Montes de Toledo" and "Saffron of La Mancha", respectively.

== Culture ==
Camuñas has no different cultural features compared to other villages in the province of Toledo or La Mancha.

=== Holidays ===
- Pecados y Danzantes de Camuñas: its name is Corpus Christi and takes places that same day, but it has nothing to do with the festivity of the same name in Toledo. It is an old tradition of the village, whose origin is unknown although probably dating back to the 16th and 17th centuries (over the centuries the ritual has been endowed with different interpretations). He currently performs through mimicry and dance, representing a fight between the bad (pecados) and the good (danzantes). Currently, this tradition has is declared of Regional Tourist Interest.
- San Nicasio: this is the patron of Camuñas and the village took it as patron in the 17th century after a serious epidemic that occurred at that time, from which they sought help. A hermitage was built in his honor, which was destroyed by the French.
- Francisquete (Tío Camuñas) Festival : it is reconstructed how Francisquete fought against the French, first weekend of August.

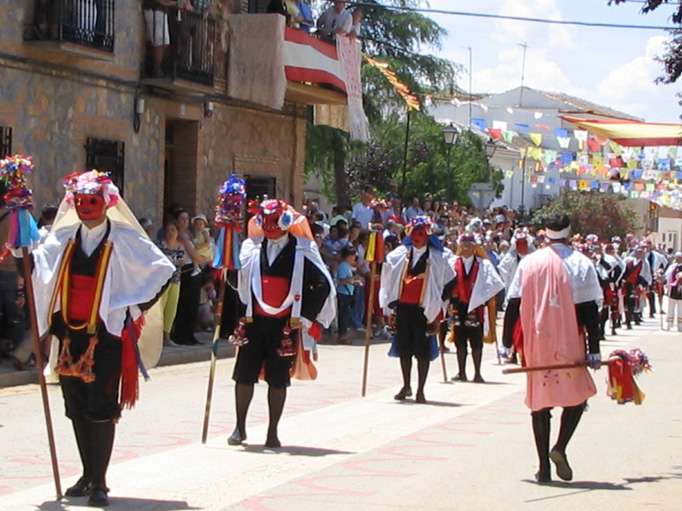
Pecados y Danzantes de Camuñas

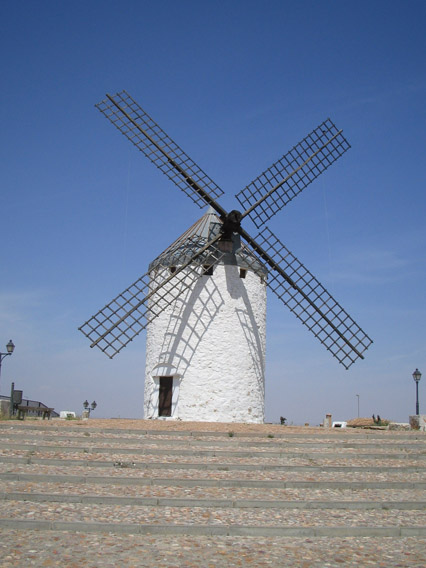
Molino de la Unión

== Main sights ==
- Iglesia parroquial de Nuestra Señora de la Asunción: church in the historic center of the town on the ruins of a previous building in Renaissance style, although with a Mudejar tower. It was restored in the 18th century with the contribution of the infante don Gabriel Antonio de Borbón (1752–88). Its roof was recently under restoration.
- Clock Tower: tower with a clock bought in 1910 at the Canseco central watchmaker, supplier to the royal house. It is located in the Plaza de Ramón y Cajal, next to the parish church.
- Molino de la Unión: windmill located almost in the top of tallest hill of Camuñas. Its name is because it suffered a great fire and was rebuilt by the union of the entire town. It has been declared Bien de Interés Cultural (BIC).
- Camuñas Ethnological Museum: museum focused on the main festival in town, Pecados y Danzantes de Camuñas. It is located to the west of the municipality, near the Amarguillo river.
- Ermita de la Veracruz.

== See also ==
- Madridejos
- Herencia
- Villafranca de los Caballeros
