= Tío Camuñas =

Spanish guerrilla (1762–1811)

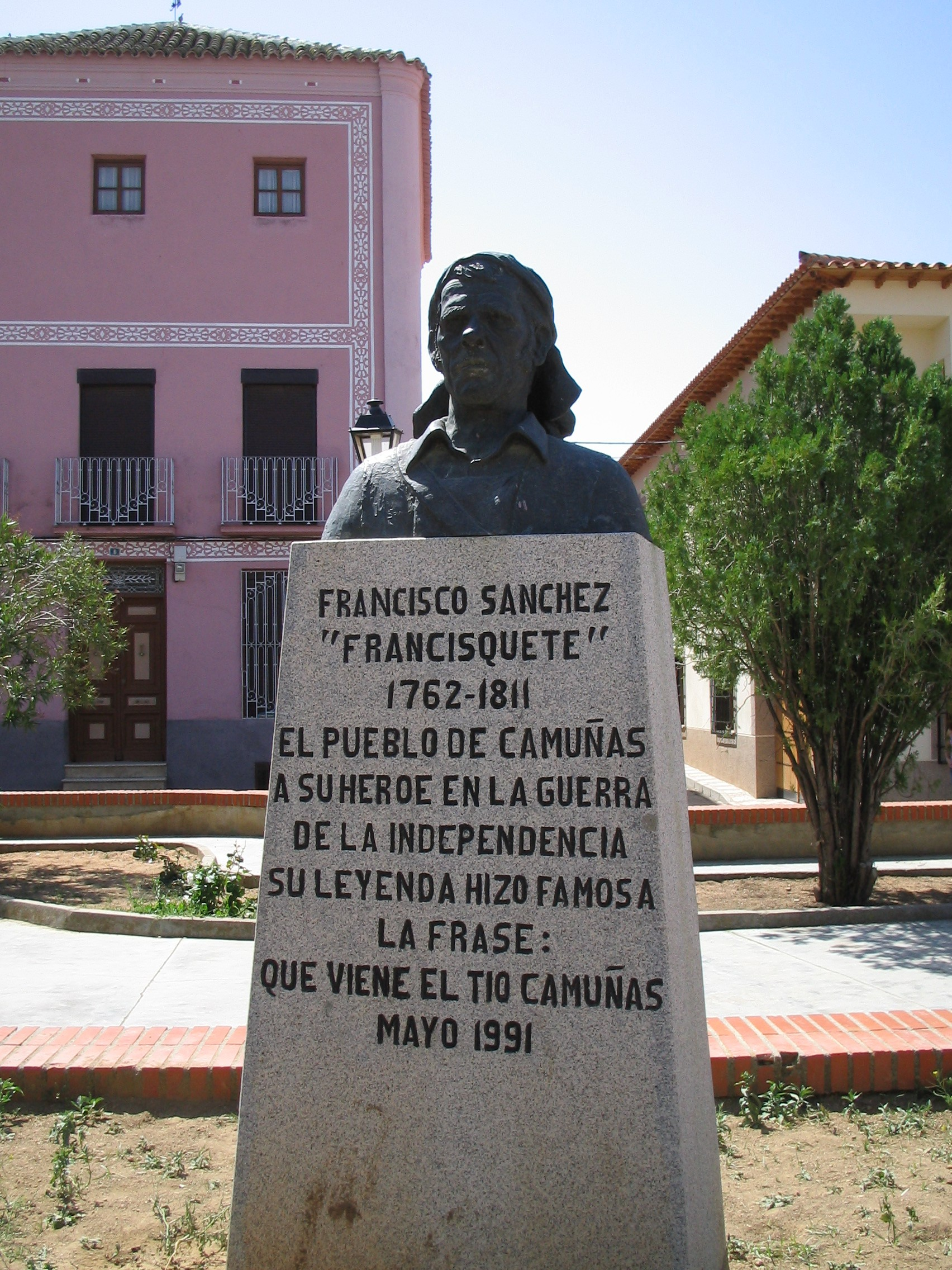
- Bust of El Tío Camuñas in his hometown
- Born: Francisco Sánchez Fernández; 11 September 1762; Camuñas, Castilla-La Mancha, Spain
- Died: 13 November 1811 (aged 49); Belmonte, Castilla-La Mancha, Spain
- Known for: Guerrilla fighter

Francisco Sánchez Fernández (11 September 1762 – 13 November 1811), commonly known as Tío Camuñas (Spanish: Uncle Camuñas) or Francisquete, was one of the most famous guerrilla fighters of La Mancha during the Peninsula War.

== Early life ==
Francisco Sánchez Fernández was born on 11 September 1762 in Camuñas (Toledo), son of Pedro Sánchez Sierra and María Fernández Cano, both natives and residents of the same town, although she is thought to come from Navalpino. His godparents were Francisco Redondo and his wife María Sánchez, the newborn's aunt, who is named after his godfather. His birth certificate was issued on 16 September by Don Miguel Bermúdez.

His life passed peacefully in Camuñas where he married on 30 May 1785, at the age of 23, with Águeda María Martín de Consuegra, a native of Madridejos, with whom he had six children: Hilario (born 1788), Mauricia (born 1793), Antonio Eustaquio (born 1796), Antonio Pantaleón (born 1798), Francisco (died 1809), and Ramona de la Cruz (born 1800). It is believed that he was a deliverer of mail, which would serve him later during his time as a guerrilla, due to his agility on horseback and his knowledge of the area.

His brother, Juan Pedro Sánchez, must have been a notorious character in Camuñas. In 1804 there was a lawsuit between the mayor and diocesan finance officer (oeconomus) to determine who was in control of the Corpus Christi festival and the appointment of piostres (major member of a confraternity), being Juan Pedro from the confraternity Cofradía del Santísimo Sacramento, appointed by the priest. On April 23, 1809 (already in the time of Napoleonic Spain), one of the members of the village council, the Frenchified Vicente Hidalgo Saavedra (with whom he maintained the previously mentioned lawsuit) killed Juan Pedro together with some French soldiers.

A new French assault on the brothers' house took place a month after this incident. Fernández managed to escape by jumping over the walls and fleeing to the field, but his brother was hit by several shots and held in the town hall until May 28, when he was executed by the French and hung on one of the blades of the Old Windmill.

The death of his brother, the abuses of the French domination over Camuñas and the death of his son Francisco (aged 10) leads Fernández to visiting the neighboring towns and calling some friends to help him, gathering thirty men on horseback, skilled marksmen and horsemen. This way began Fernández's fight against the French, who will popularize the phrase "¡Que viene el tío Camuñas!" ("Uncle Camuñas is coming!") due to his fame as a ruthless fighter.

== Military successes ==
Tío Camuñas became one of the most important guerrillas in La Mancha, with his attacks often taking place on the royal road from Madridejos to Despeñaperros.

On 5 October 1809, he attacked 80 soldiers who were in La Guardia with his 40 guerrillas (killing eleven, wounding seven and making the rest flee). Tío Camuñas guerrilla attacked a French detachment in Puerto Lápice on 24 October, stabbing several soldiers and taking the rest prisoner. In December 1809, with his guerrillas, he escorted Juan Antonio Miranda from Madridejos to Valdepeñas, who traveled with his family from Madrid to Seville as an envoy of the Junta General. Juan Antonio was traveling with his family from Madrid to Seville to warn of the invasion of Andalusia that Napoleon and Marshal Soult were preparing.

In April 1810 he surprised a detachment of 120 Frenchmen in Lillo who tried to take refuge in the houses. Facing the threat of setting them on fire if they did not surrender, the entire detachment finally surrendered and were made prisoners.

Later, on May 10 he seized a large convoy made up of sixty cars loaded with tobacco, gunpowder, and other effects. On May 17, two soldiers from his party seized the mailbags that were carrying a French and a Spanish courier in the mountains around Consuegra and Mora. The 50-soldiers escort that guarded them ran to their aid but fled when Francisco and his companions arrived. The afternoon of 24 May Tío Camuñas encountered and caused some casualties on a detachment of 400 infantry and 90 horses that were heading from Alcázar de San Juan to Mota del Cuervo; the following days other French detachments near Pedernoso were also forced to retreat to San Clemente.

Tío Camuñas and his group were summoned then to go to Cuenca and oppose the French army (that was advancing to the city from Cañete). His lieutenant Martín Almarza attacked the French in Santa Cruz de la Zarza (seizing a shipment with three cartloads of salt, killing 13 soldiers and taking four prisoners). His group was commanded to feint and then attack the enemy rearguard through Saelices and Uclés.

On July 20, he attacked a detachment of 80 dragoons who were guarding thirty bulls in the vicinity of Toledo, that were intended for bullfighting in St. James Day. Tío Camuñas and his squad captured the bulls and took the escort and the cowboys as prisoners. Days after this last intervention, he appears in Tomelloso defying the French garrison (made up of 200 infantrymen and 40 horses) and causing them 50 casualties. Later, knowing that an important convoy of 70 cars with cartridges, lead and other effects was going to pass through Consuegra, he suddenly attacked it during a turning point on the road, engaging in a hard-fought battle that resulted in seizing the convoy and causing the French 60 casualties.

Guerrilla Commander El Empecinado brought Tío Camuñas and his son Hilario on 2 November (along with three others from the party) to brigadier Osorio's presence for having mistreated a guerrilla fighter from El Empecinado's group, and disobeying orders from General Joaquín Blake (head of the Center Army).

During this period, his wife Águeda dies and he remarries Josefa Romero, who appears as his wife both on Tío Camuñas' death certificate and on his own.

== Death and popular repercussion ==
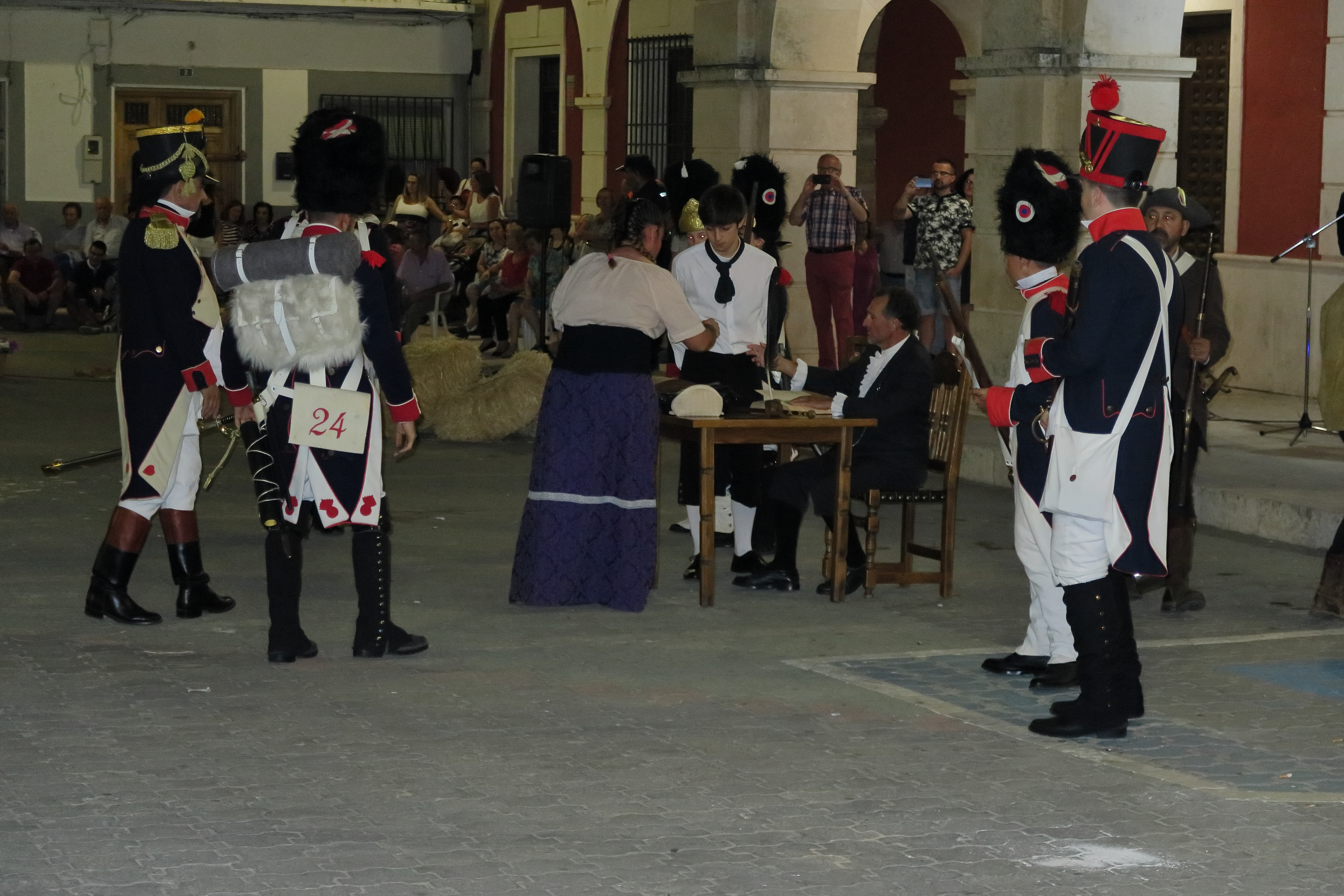
Theatrical representation of the confrontation between Tío Camuñas guerrillas and Napoleonic soldiers

On November 12, 1811, while Tío Camuñas was in the town of Belmonte together with his party, he was surprised and surrounded by some French detachments under the command of General d'Armagnac (head of the column that arrived from Tarancón). Although they faced the French troops, Tío Camuñas is finally wounded and taken prisoner along with the few men he had left. Tío Camuñas was shot on November 13, 1811, dying at the age of 49 and after three years of fighting, being buried in the collegiate church of Belmonte by order of the French general with all solemnity.

Tío Camuñas is an idol widely remembered generation after generation in his hometown Camuñas. He is commemorated on the first weekend of August since 2008 in the celebration called Fiestas de Francisquete, gives name to a street ("Calle de Francisquete") and has a bronze bust in the town hall square. In the town where he was shot, Belmonte, he also has a street since 2011 ("Calle Tío Camuñas") and a plaque with some of his most iconic quotes: "Yo no he estudiado nada, pero sé por la luz natural, que un pueblo oprimido es un pueblo que sufre violencia" ("I haven't studied anything, but I know from natural light that an oppressed people is a people that suffers violence").

=== Urban legend ===
Tío Camuñas has been reflected in the popular culture of some parts of Spain as a way to scare children. In Asturias it is said that he lives on the roofs or attics, from which he comes down to take the children. In some places in León, the expression "pareces el tío Camuñas" ("you look like Tío Camuñas") is used to describe someone as unkempt and shabby, but mainly as stealthy (another version of it is "entró como las camuñas"); meanwhile, in other parts of Castilla y León, it is said that Tío Camuñas lives in the wells and if children play very close to them or try to lean out of one, he will pick them up and take them away. In Extremadura it is also used to scare the children with the phrase "que te lleva Camuñas" ("that Camuñas takes you"), and in the area of the Pyrenees of Huesca it is a family name of the devil with which children are frightened.

== See also ==
- Guerrilla warfare in the Peninsular War
- Agustina de Aragón
- Francisco Abad Moreno, "Chaleco"
- Francisco de Longa
- Francisco Espoz y Mina
- Jerónimo Merino, "el Cura Merino"
- Juan Martin Díez "el Empecinado"
- Martin Xavier Mina
