= Castrillo de Duero =

Spanish village

Coordinates: 41°35′N 4°01′W

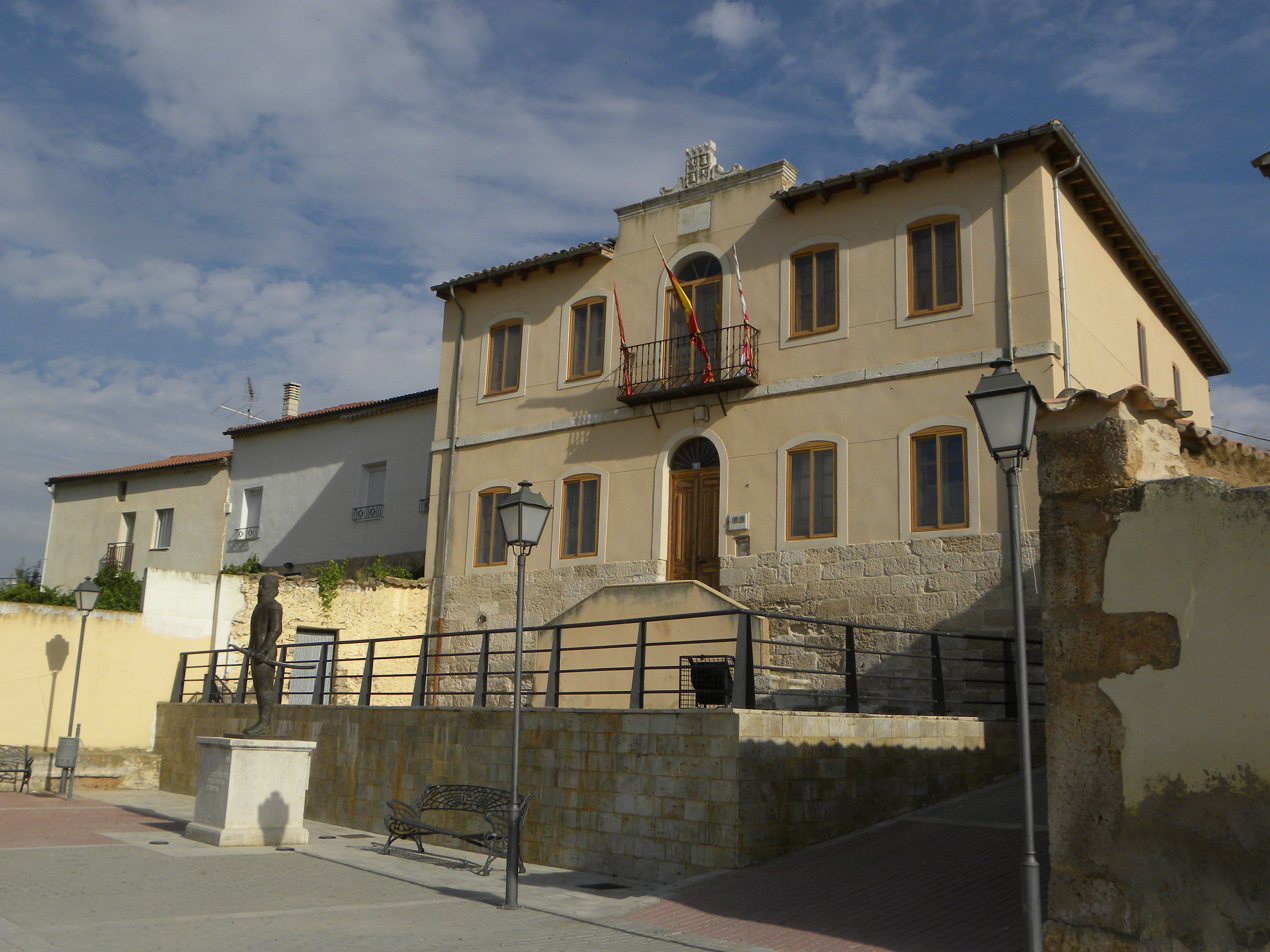

Castrillo de Duero is a village in Valladolid, Castile-Leon, Spain. The municipality covers an area of 25.77 square kilometres (9.95 sq mi) and as of 2011 had a population of 155 people.
