= Valoria la Buena =

Coordinates: 41°48′N 4°32′W

Valoria la Buena, Spain
- Coat of arms
- Interactive map of Valoria la Buena, Spain
- Country: Spain
- Autonomous community: Castile and León
- Province: Valladolid
- Municipality: Valoria la Buena

Area
  - Total: 43 km^{2} (17 sq mi)
- Elevation: 726 m (2,382 ft)

Population (2025-01-01)
  - Total: 740
  - Density: 17/km^{2} (45/sq mi)
- Time zone: UTC+1 (CET)
  - Summer (DST): UTC+2 (CEST)

Valoria la Buena is a municipality located in the province of Valladolid, Castile and León, Spain. According to the 2018 census (INE), the municipality has a population of 647 inhabitants.

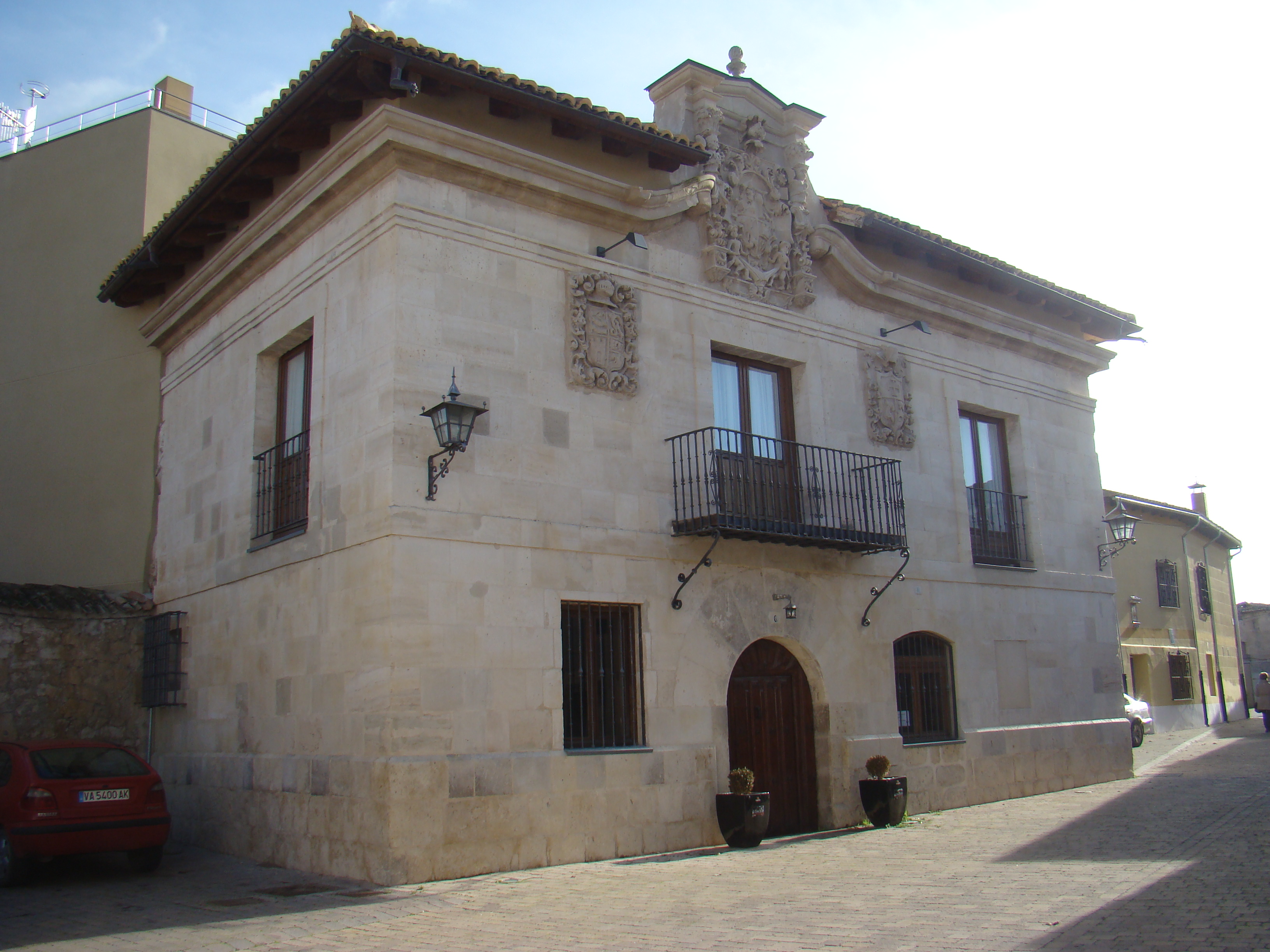
Palace of the Viscounts of Valoria la Buena.
