= Villafranca de los Caballeros =

- Municipality
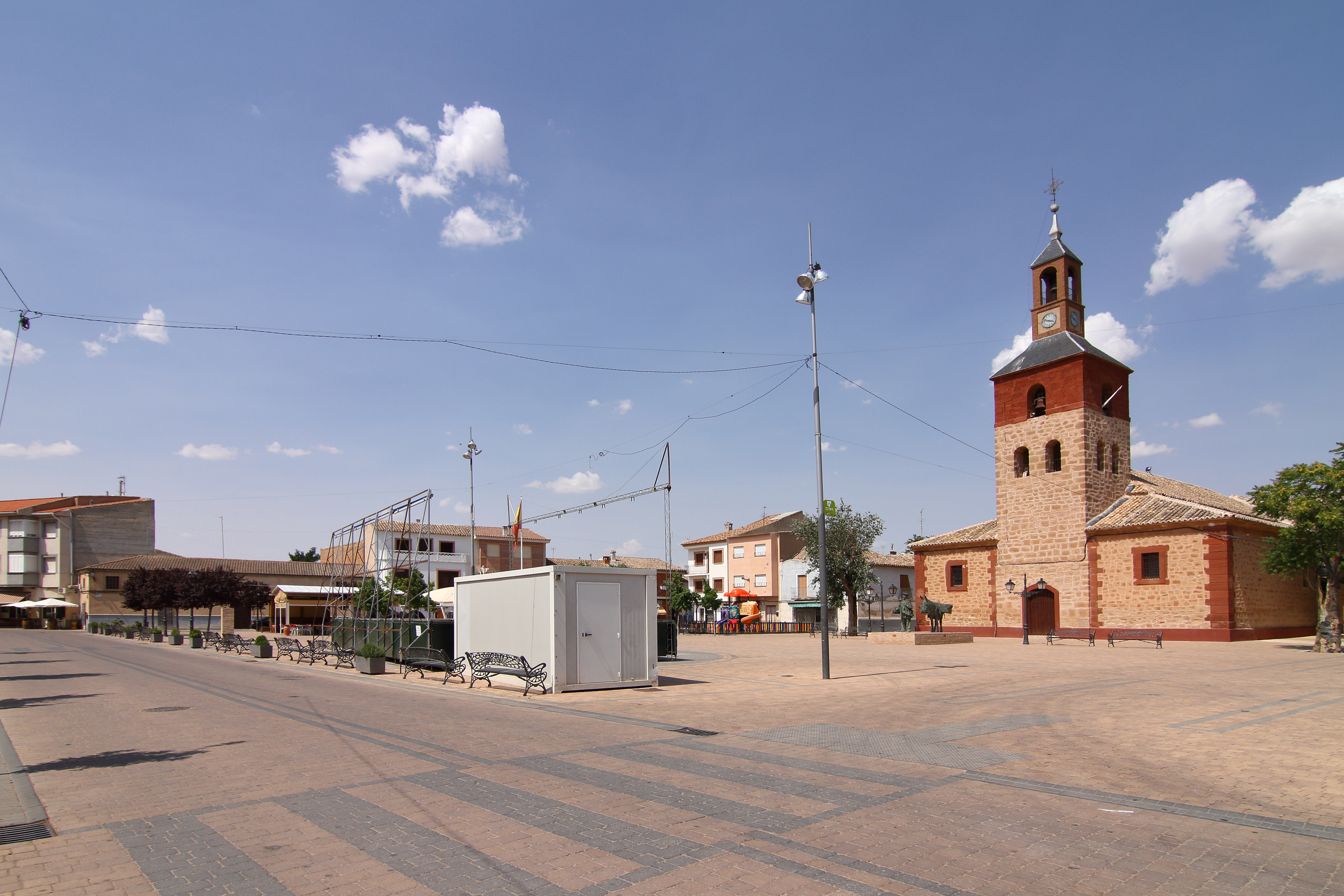
- Villafranca de los Caballeros Main Square

- Coat of arms
- Interactive map of Villafranca de los Caballeros
- Coordinates: 39°25′34″N 3°21′27″W
- Country: Spain
- Autonomous community: Castile-La Mancha
- Province: Toledo
- Municipality: Villafranca de los Caballeros

Area
  - Total: 107 km^{2} (41 sq mi)
- Elevation: 643 m (2,110 ft)

Population (2025-01-01)
  - Total: 4,884
  - Density: 45.6/km^{2} (118/sq mi)
- Time zone: UTC+1 (CET)
  - Summer (DST): UTC+2 (CEST)
- Website: eltiocazuela

Villafranca de los Caballeros is a municipality located in the province of Toledo, Castile-La Mancha, Spain. According to the 2006 census (INE), the municipality had a population of 5327 inhabitants.

== Toponymy ==
In 1557 king Philip II granted it the charter of town (in Spanish villa). At the beginning of being populated, it was allowed to be free of taxes (frank) for six years. The wording "de los Caballeros" would be added to the name of "Villafranca" because of some customary events from the time of Middle Ages. "It happened every year, the day of St. Martin, that the representatives of all villages and towns belonging to the Order of the Knights of St. John gathered at the place, to deal with the use of community pastures. In the gathering, representatives would answer when asked: ... may speak now the gentleman from <given town>...". And for holding, even if it was only for a day, attending people who was considered to be gentlemen (caballeros in Spanish), the town received that surname. So the place became known as "Villafranca de los Caballeros". There is a handful of other towns that are also called Villafranca (frank town), but hey, there's only one Villafranca de los Caballeros in all Spain.

This information has been extracted from the old file Descriptions of Cardinal Lorenzana, 1784. I'm not sure of how to write the reference.

== History ==
According to the few excavations carried out, the first settlers in Villafranca were the Iberians. If you can read Spanish, that's what most of people say about the town. Actually the studies carried out have been very limited and there are certain traces of settlers from Stone Age. So, that the only studied archaeological sites may have been so far of Iberians from the 7th and 6th centuries B.C. doesn't mean they were the very first to settle in the area. Also, the sites are much far from the current town's historical center. Speaking about this zone, the first mention of this place dates back to Muslim invasion, where Muslims and Christians did coexist in the area called today Cruz de Lozano. Then, by 1085, Toledo was conquered by the Christian king Alfonso VI. At the same time, Consuegra was also recovered by the Christians, and Villafranca gets to depend of it. Consuegra is handed over to the Order of the Knights of St. John. Villafranca as well as other towns becomes a property of the order. Since then, the town would depend in one way or another from the Order until the ecclesiastical confiscations of the 19th century in Spain, when the Order properties in Spain were seized and the Grand Priory was ended.

== Heritage ==
=== Parish Church of Our Lady of the Assumption ===
This is the most important monument in the town. Its construction began back in the 13th century as a Romanesque church, but was later modified and enlarged in the 16th and 18th centuries with the addition of some gothic elements, like a central rib vault.

=== Chapel of the Saint Christ of St. Anna ===
Current building is the result of the enlargement, at the beginning of the 18th century (or perhaps at the end of the 17th), of an old chapel, which was devoted to St. Anna, the mother of the Virgin Mary. The original carving of the Christ was found in the basement of that primitive chapel (perhaps buried there during the Muslim invasions to protect it). By then it was known as St. Christ of the True Cross. But because it was found in the chapel of St. Anna, people started to call it by that name as well. Today, the ancient name can only be found in old writings, and everybody in the town call it St. Christ of St. Anna. Little is known exactly about the date the original chapel was built. We have some references it already existed in 1691. Studies are being made by historians in old archives to find out the truth, but so far all we know is from its legend more than history. Today's building was designed like a salon in the baroque style. The interior was covered with paintings, but in 1993 the paintings from the walls were removed because a severe problem of humidity. Paintings still can be seen in the vaults of the ceilings.

== Demographics ==
Historical population
Year	Pop.	±%
1900	3,730	—
1910	4,157	+11.4%
1920	4,560	+9.7%
1930	5,046	+10.7%
1940	4,932	−2.3%
1950	5,467	+10.8%
1960	5,765	+5.5%
1970	5,340	−7.4%
1981	5,363	+0.4%
1991	5,247	−2.2%
2001	5,305	+1.1%
2011	5,404	+1.9%
2021	4,866	−10.0%
2023	4,846	−0.4%
Source: INE
