= Cabezón de Cameros =

- Municipality
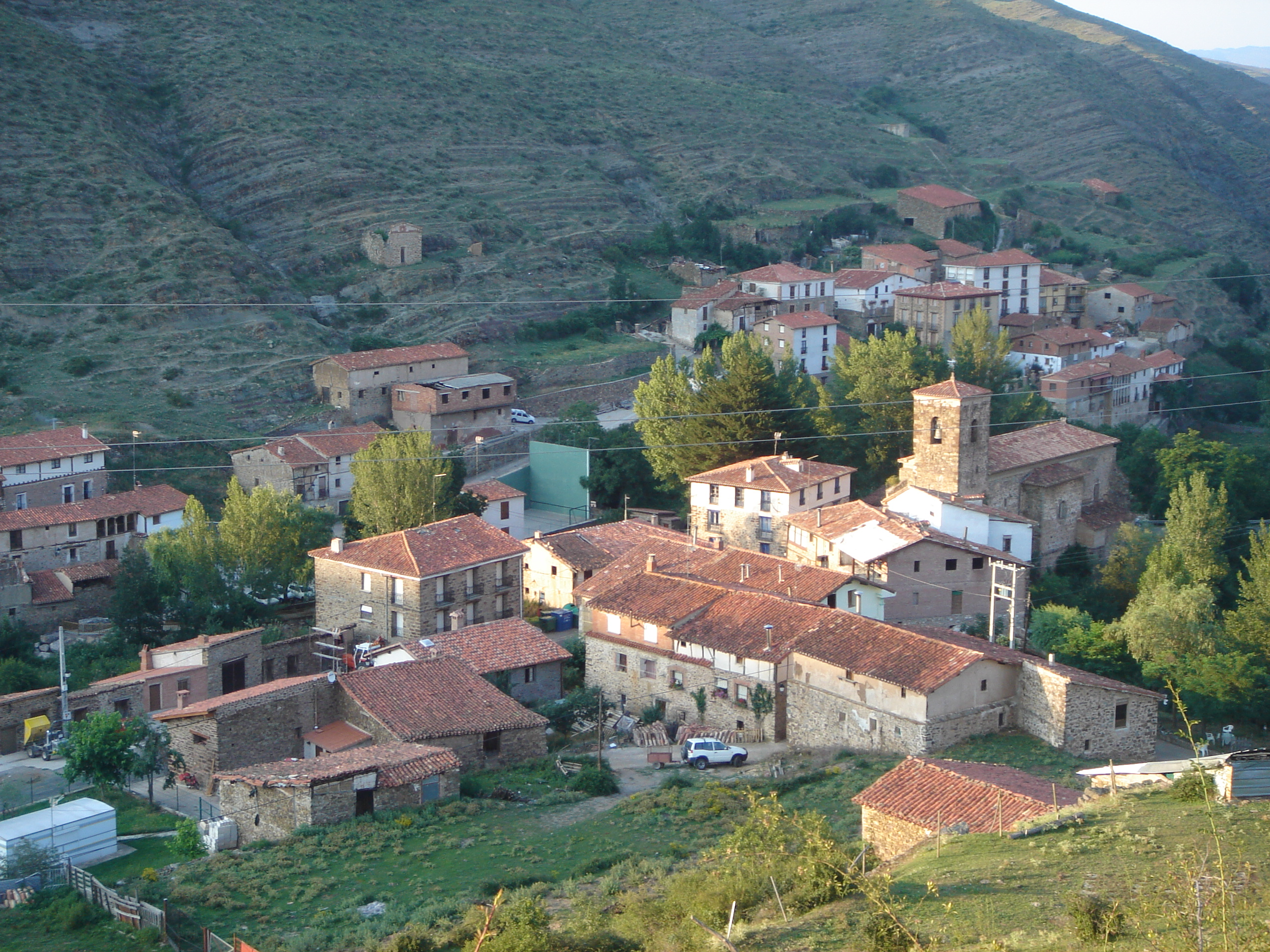
- Aerial view of Cabezón de Cameros

- Location within La Rioja, Spain Location within Spain
- Coordinates: 42°11′48″N 2°31′8″W
- Country: Spain
- Autonomous community: La Rioja
- Comarca: Camero Viejo

Government
  - Alcalde: Rodrigo Alba Martínez (People's Party)

Area
  - Total: 12.01 km^{2} (4.64 sq mi)
- Elevation: 920 m (3,020 ft)

Population (2023)
  - Total: 23
  - Density: 1.9/km^{2} (5.0/sq mi)
- Postal code: 26135

Cabezón de Cameros, a municipality in La Rioja, Spain. The municipality has a population of only 23 (2023), and is one of the 10 least populated municipalities in this region, and one of the 100 least populated of Spain as a whole. In 2018, the population was 20, and in 2013 it was 18. Cabezón de Cameros ranks fourth in Spain with respect to the male to female population ratio (15:8). Its surface is 12 km² and its population density is 1.9 p/km². Its geographic coordinates are: latitude, 42° 11' N, longitude: 2° 31' W and it has an altitude of 923 meters. The distance from Logroño, the regional capital, is 43 kilometers.

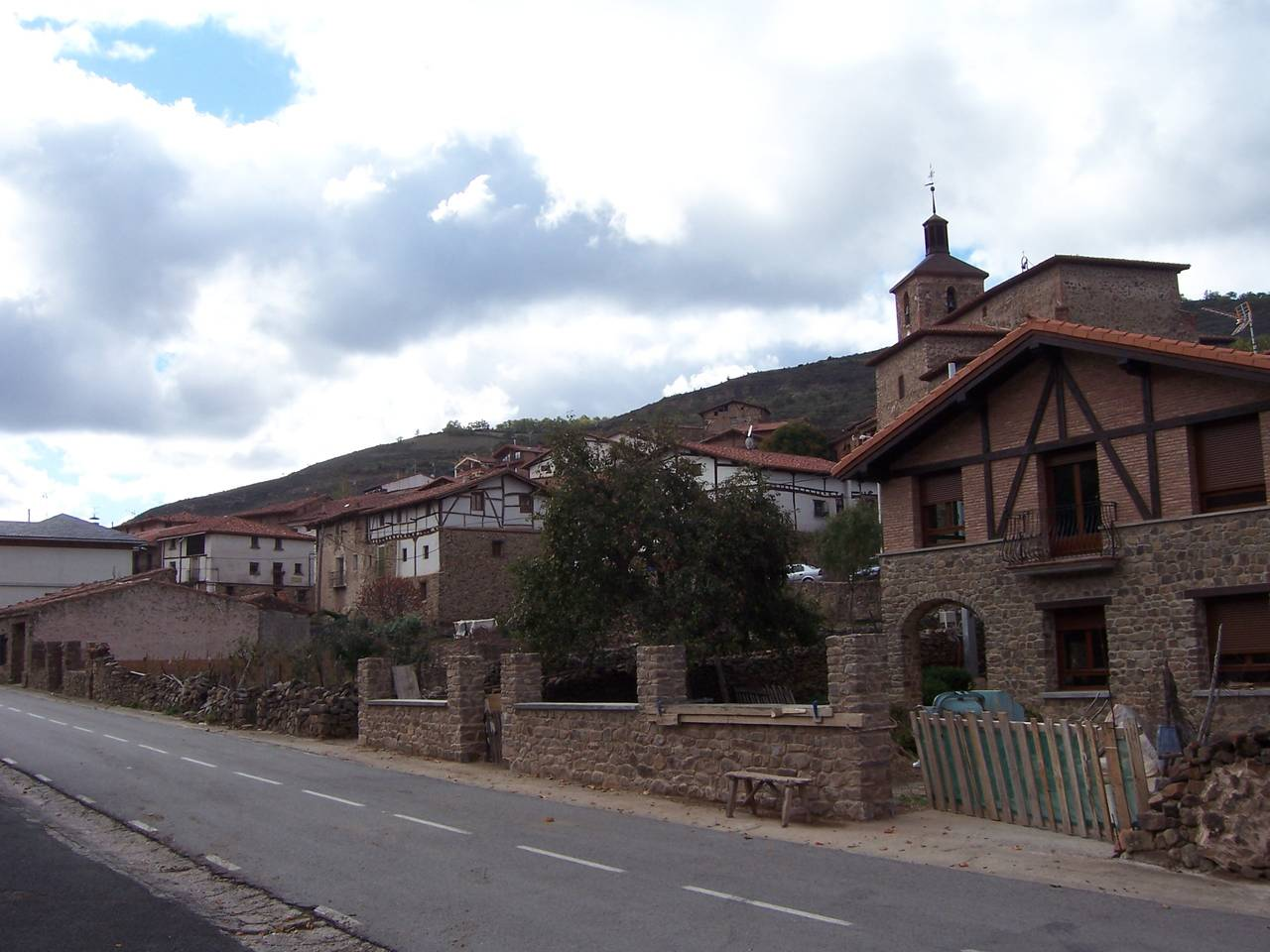
Railway passing for Cabezón de Cameros.

The mayor of Cabezón de Cameros is Rodrigo Alba Martínez, of the Partido Popular. In the 2023 Spanish general election the People's Party got 76% of the votes (16 votes), and the PSOE got 24% of the votes (5 votes).
