= Quintanilla de Trigueros =

Coordinates: 41°51′N 4°39′W

Quintanilla de Trigueros, Spain
- Flag Coat of arms

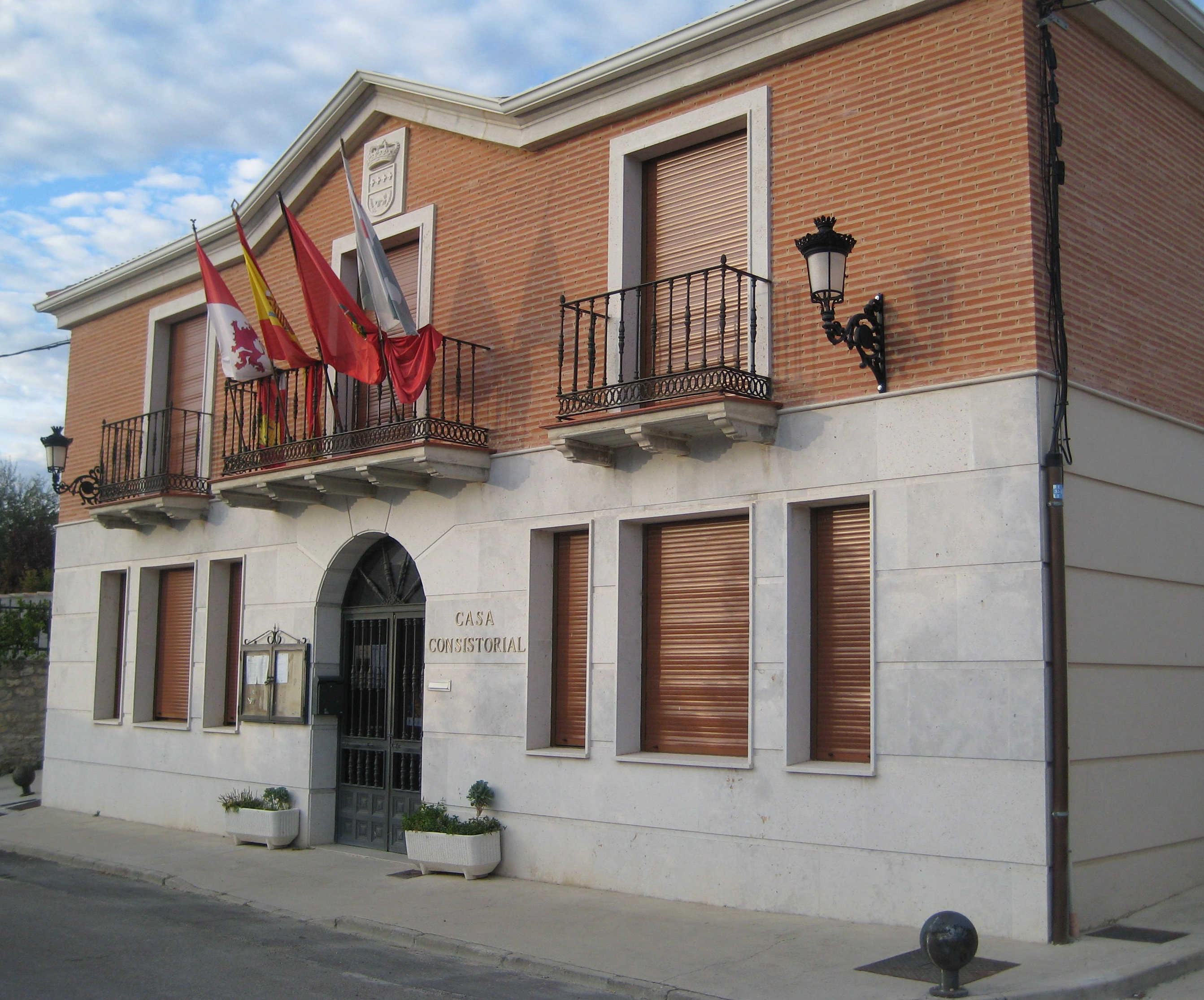
- Town hall
- Country: Spain
- Autonomous community: Castile and León
- Province: Valladolid
- Municipality: Quintanilla de Trigueros

Area
  - Total: 32 km^{2} (12 sq mi)

Population (2025-01-01)
  - Total: 100
  - Density: 3.1/km^{2} (8.1/sq mi)
- Time zone: UTC+1 (CET)
  - Summer (DST): UTC+2 (CEST)

Quintanilla de Trigueros is a municipality located in the province of Valladolid, Castile and León, Spain. According to the 2004 census (INE), the municipality has a population of 118 inhabitants.
