= San Martín de Valvení =

Coordinates: 41°45′N 4°34′W

San Martín de Valvení, Spain
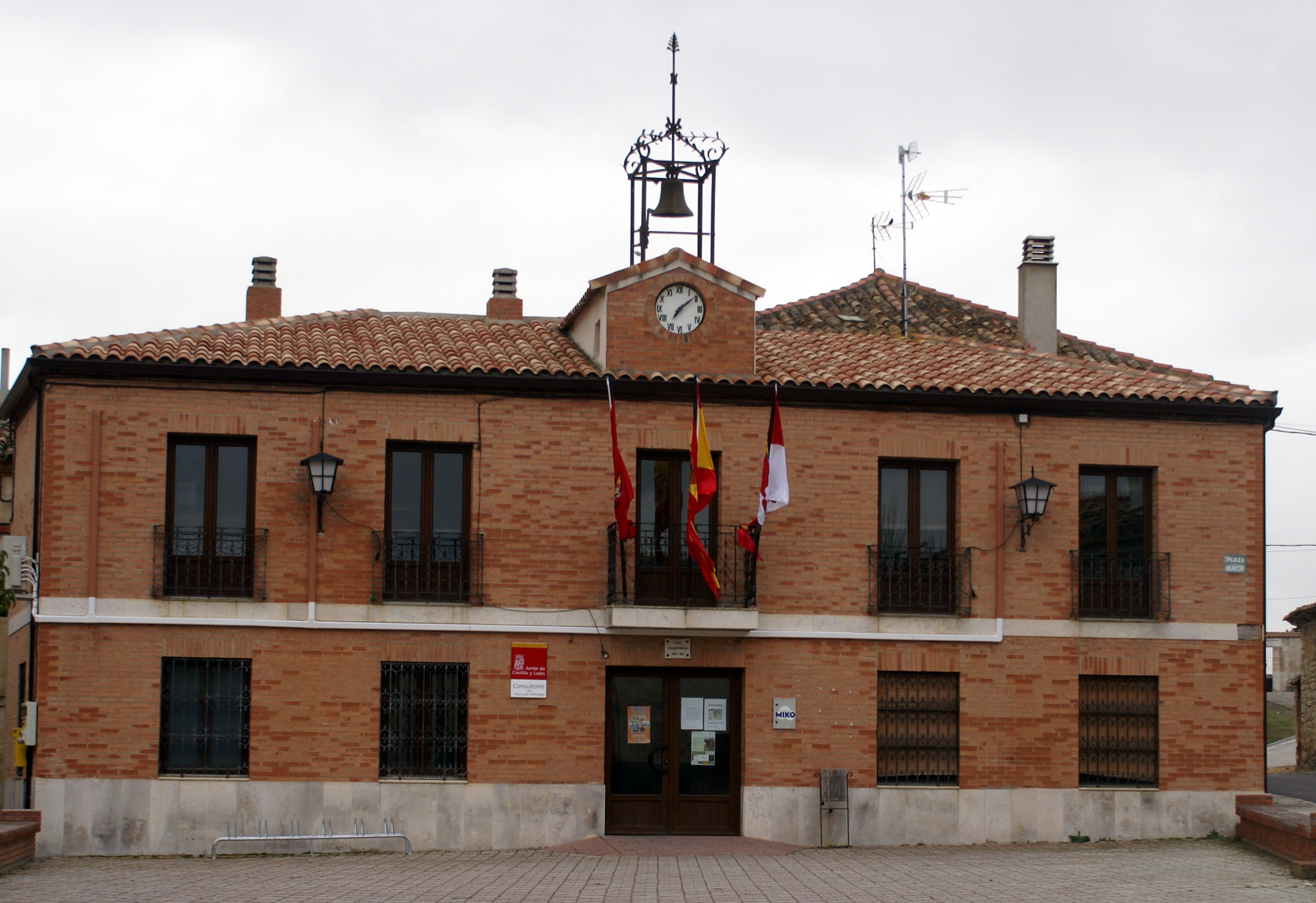
- Town hall of San Martín de Valvení, Valladolid, Spain

- Flag
- Interactive map of San Martín de Valvení, Spain
- Country: Spain
- Autonomous community: Castile and León
- Province: Valladolid
- Municipality: San Martín de Valvení

Area
  - Total: 58 km^{2} (22 sq mi)

Population (2025-01-01)
  - Total: 78
  - Density: 1.3/km^{2} (3.5/sq mi)
- Time zone: UTC+1 (CET)
  - Summer (DST): UTC+2 (CEST)

San Martín de Valvení is a municipality located in the province of Valladolid, Castile and León, Spain. According to the 2004 census (INE), the municipality has a population of 105 inhabitants.
