= Cabezón de Valderaduey =

Coordinates: 42°10′N 5°09′W

Cabezón de Valderaduey, Spain
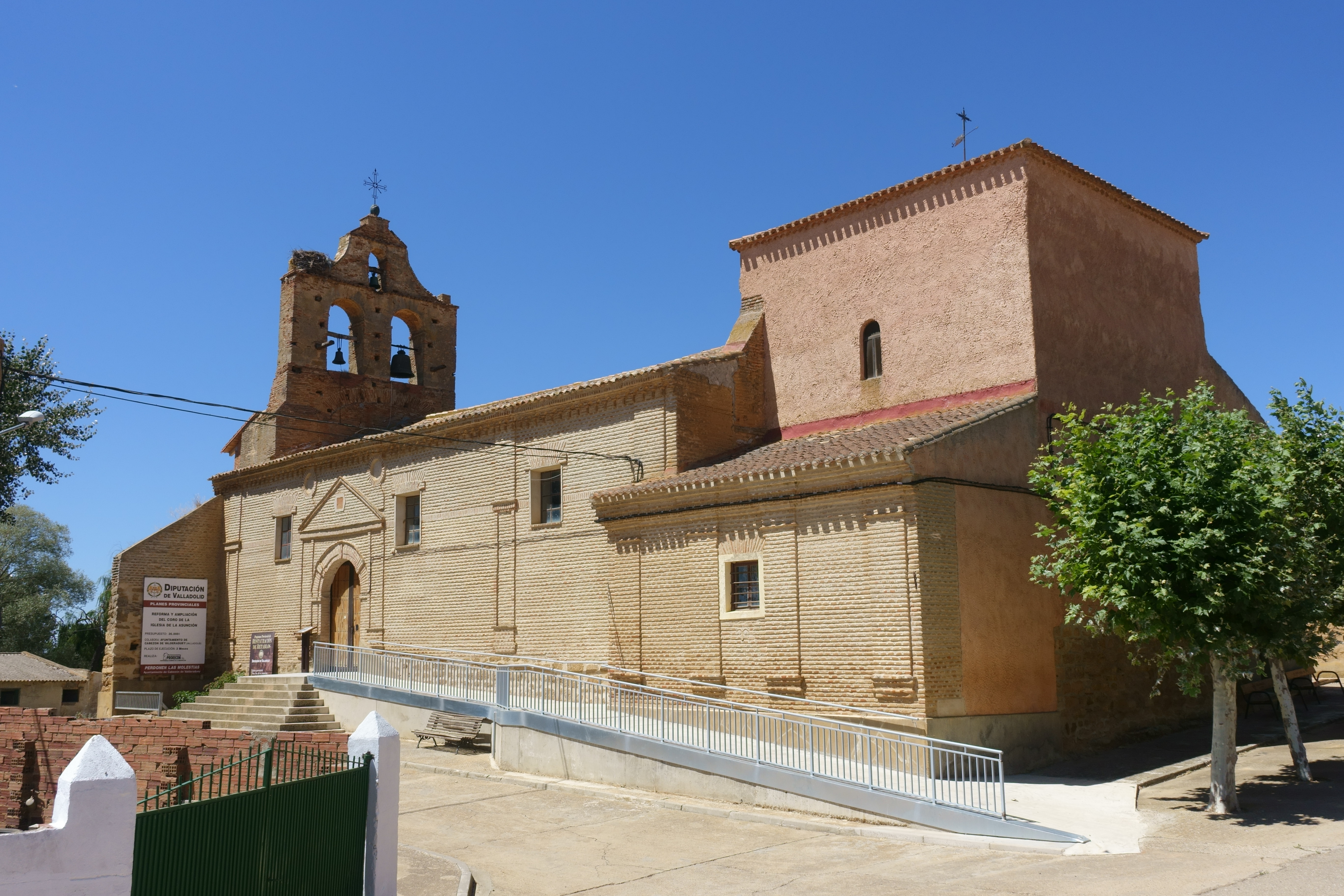
- Church of the Assumption of Our Lady, Cabezón de Valderaduey (Valladolid, Spain).

- Coat of arms
- Interactive map of Cabezón de Valderaduey, Spain
- Country: Spain
- Autonomous community: Castile and León
- Province: Valladolid
- Municipality: Cabezón de Valderaduey

Area
  - Total: 10 km^{2} (3.9 sq mi)

Population (2025-01-01)
  - Total: 24
  - Density: 2.4/km^{2} (6.2/sq mi)
- Time zone: UTC+1 (CET)
  - Summer (DST): UTC+2 (CEST)

Cabezón de Valderaduey is a municipality located in the province of Valladolid, Castile and León, Spain. According to the 2004 census (INE), the municipality has a population of 53 inhabitants.
