= Cabezón de Pisuerga =

Cabezón de Pisuerga, Spain
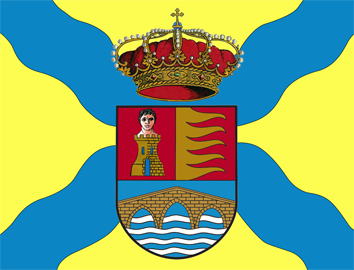
- Flag Coat of arms

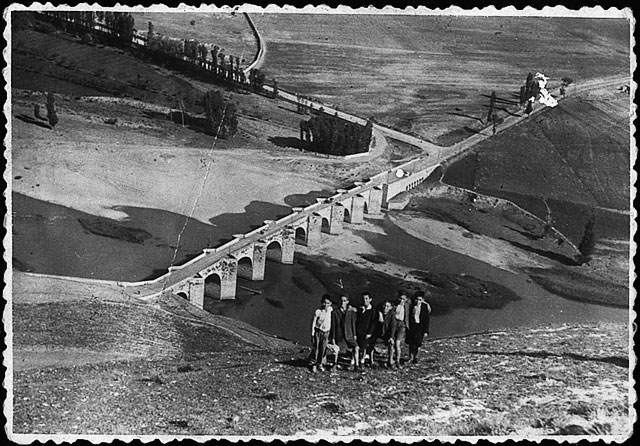
- Bridge across the River Pisuerga
- Coordinates: 41.7333°N 4.6464°W
- Country: Spain
- Autonomous community: Castile and León
- Province: Valladolid
- Municipality: Cabezón de Pisuerga

Area
  - Total: 45.28 km^{2} (17.48 sq mi)

Population (2025-01-01)
  - Total: 3,910
  - Density: 86.4/km^{2} (224/sq mi)
- Time zone: UTC+1 (CET)
  - Summer (DST): UTC+2 (CEST)

Cabezón de Pisuerga is a municipality located in the province of Valladolid, Castile and León, Spain. According to the 2025 census (INE), the municipality had a population of 3,910 inhabitants.

== History ==
The village was the site of the Battle of Cabezón, a Spanish defeat in the Peninsular War.

== Gallery ==
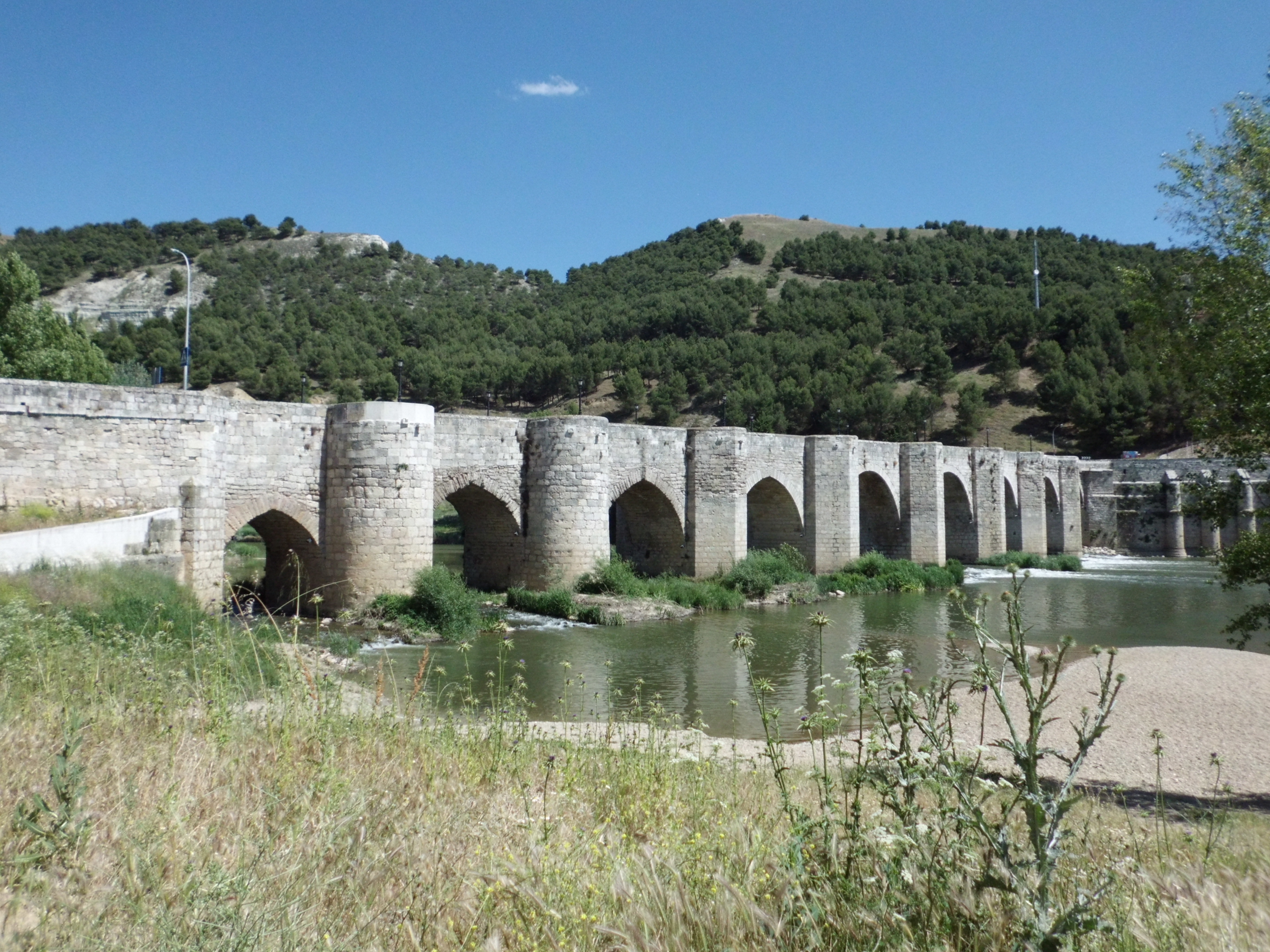
Cabezón de Pisuerga Bridge; in the background of the image is the mountain, frequented by hikers

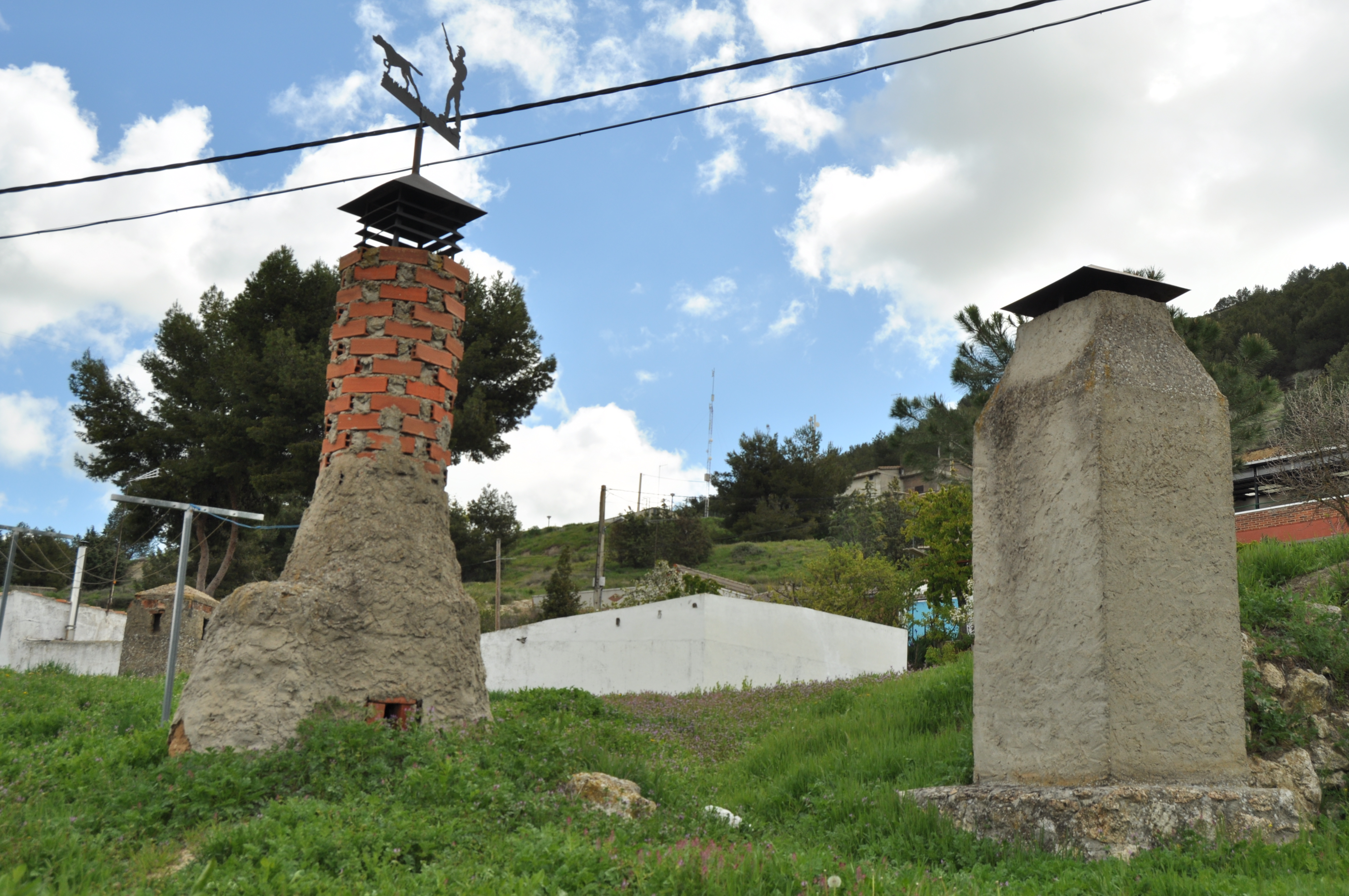
Winery area, near the mountain

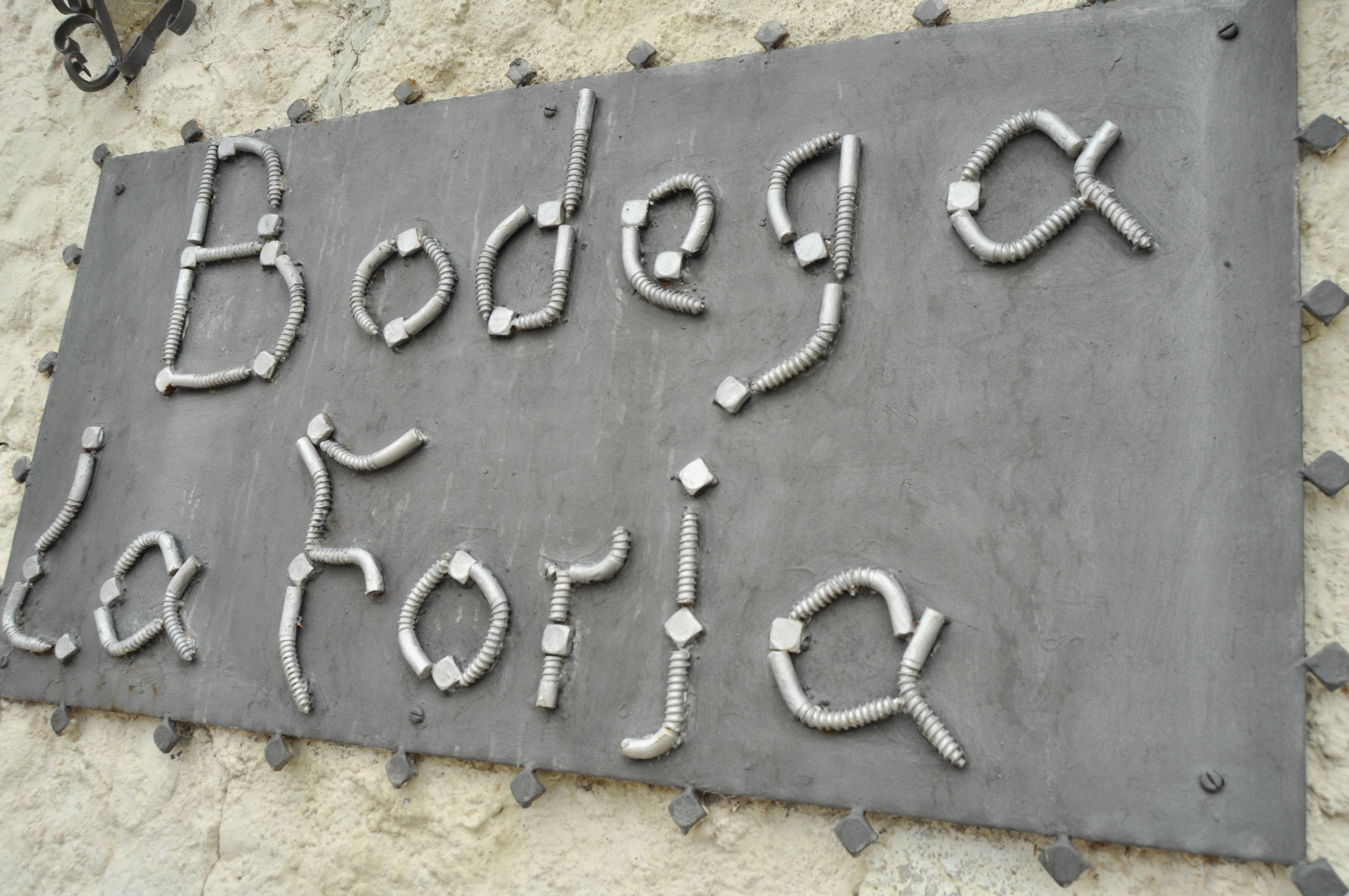
Bodega la Forja, currently closed

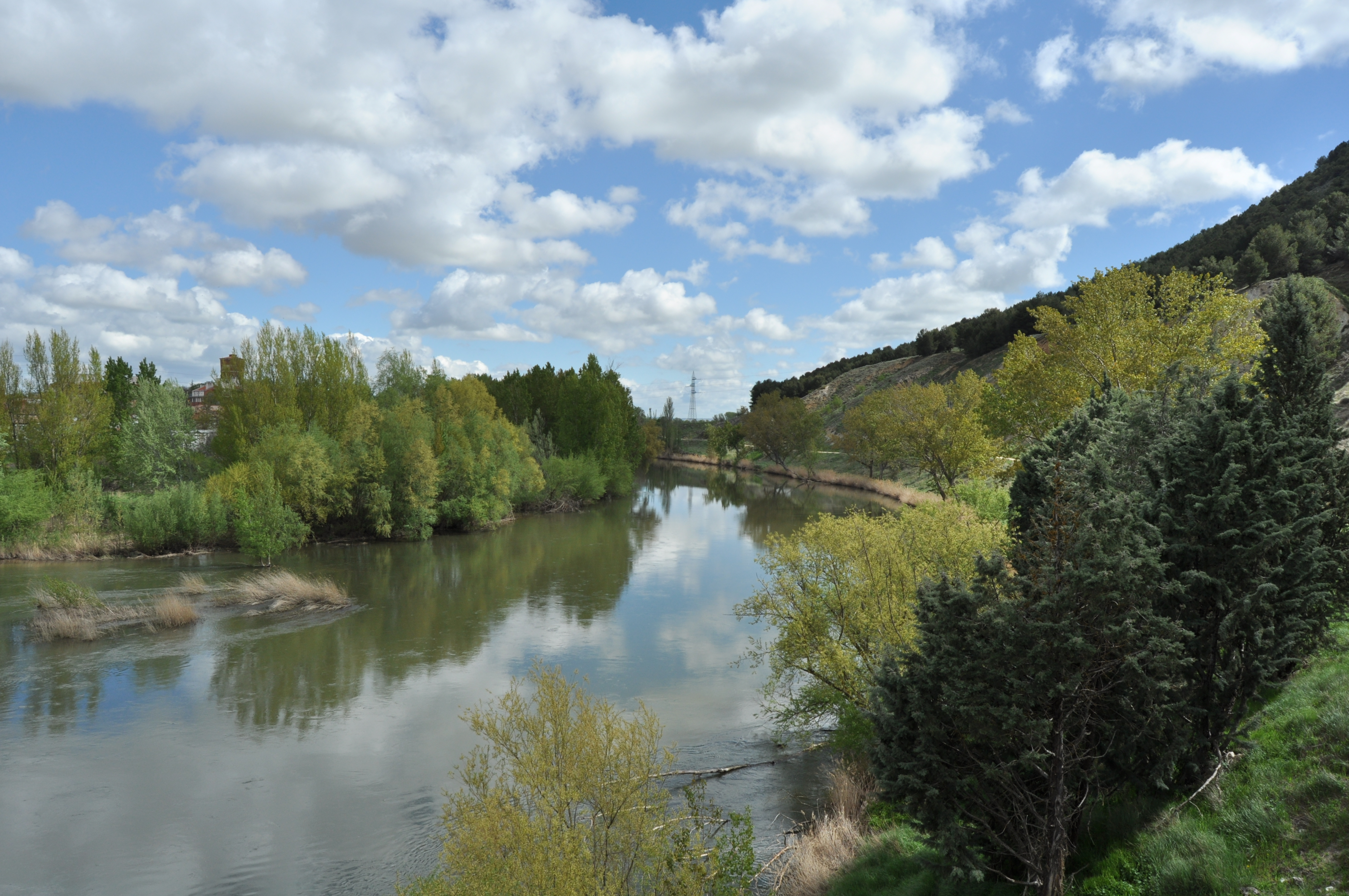
Pisuerga River near the Cabezón bridge

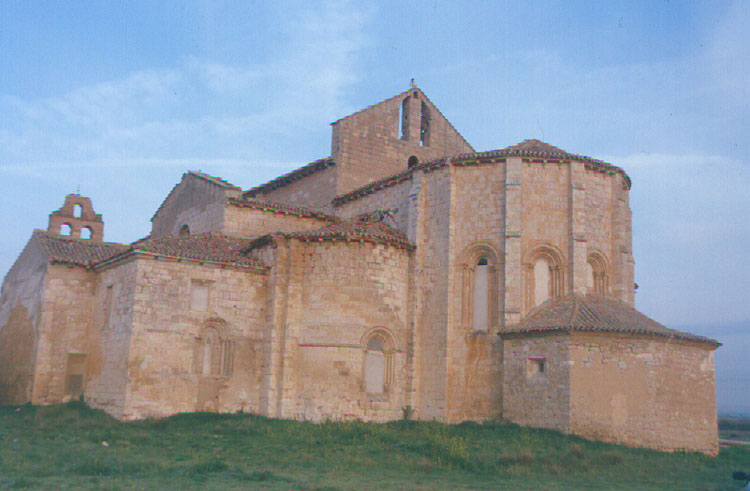
Monastery of Santa María de Palazuelos

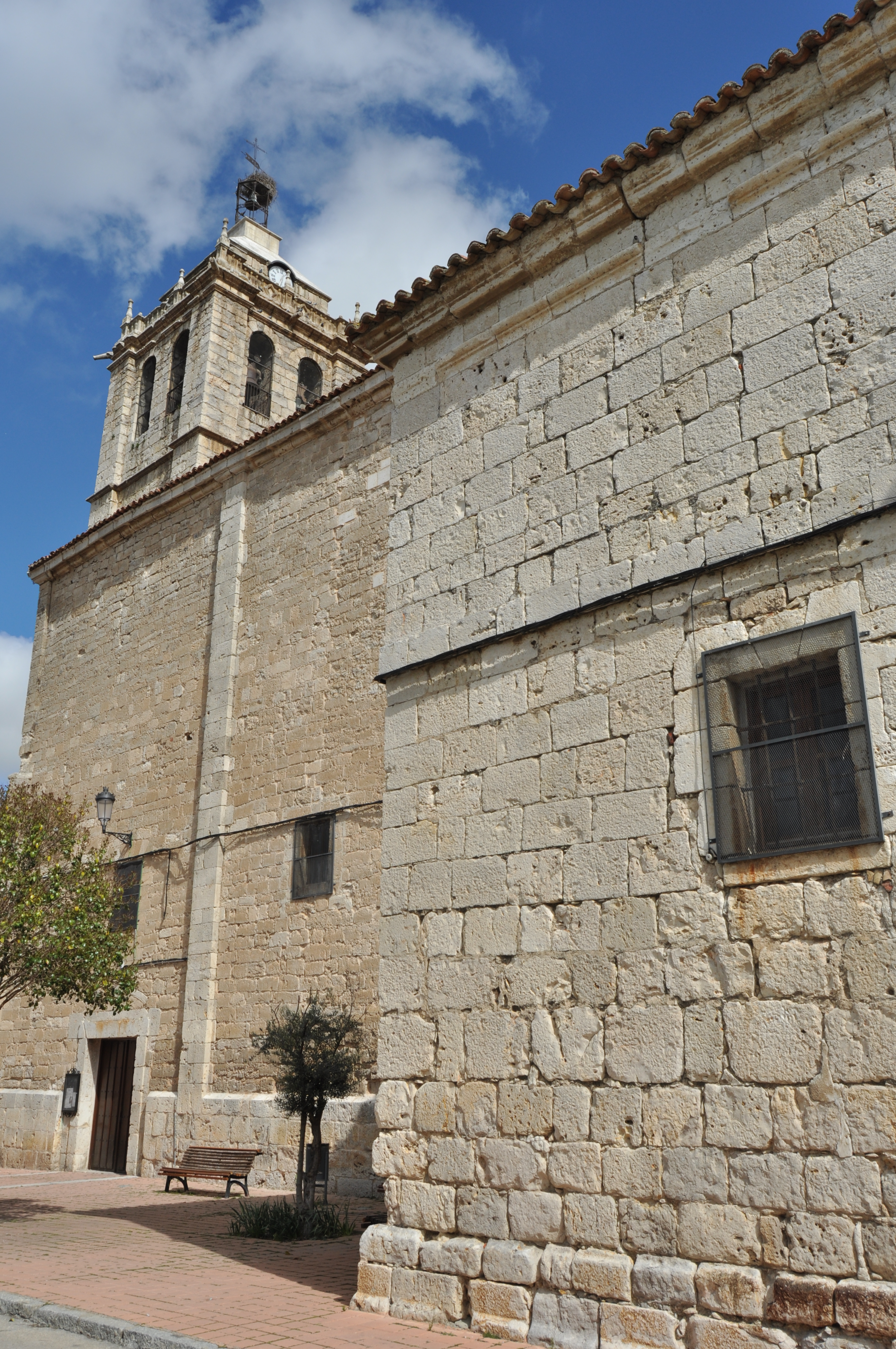
Church of Nuestra Señora de la Asunción

== See also ==
- Cigales (DO)
- Cuisine of the province of Valladolid
