= Puerto Lápice =

- Municipality
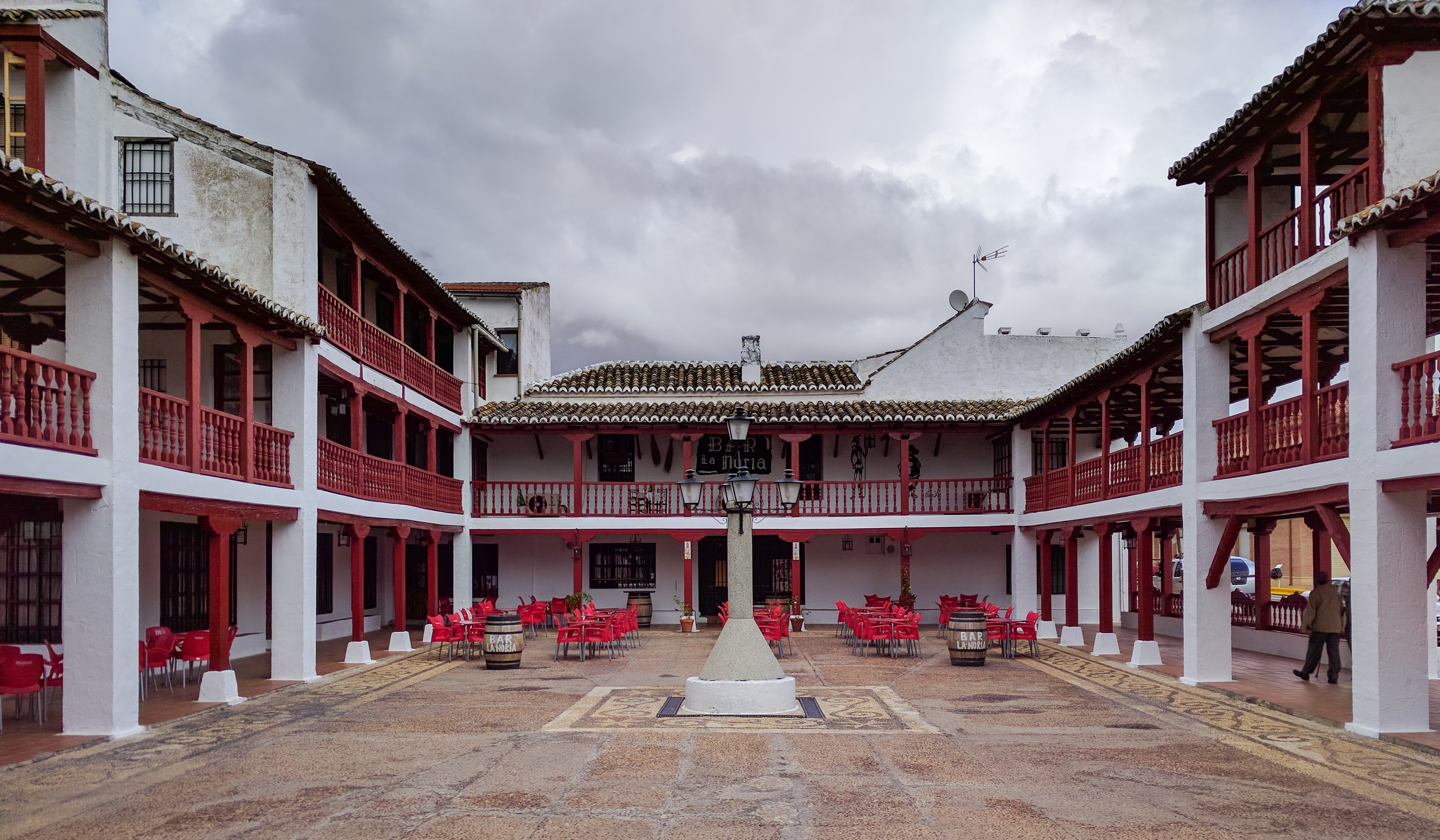

- Coat of arms

- Location within Castilla-La Mancha Location within Spain
- Coordinates: 39°19′28″N 3°28′52″W
- Country: Spain
- Autonomous community: Castilla–La Mancha
- Province: Ciudad Real

Government
  - Mayor: Ana Maria Contreras Pavón

Area
  - Total: 54.84 km^{2} (21.17 sq mi)
- Elevation: 680 m (2,230 ft)

Population (2025-01-01)
  - Total: 824
  - Density: 15.0/km^{2} (38.9/sq mi)
- Demonym: Porteños
- Time zone: UTC+1 (CET)
  - Summer (DST): UTC+2 (CEST)
- Postal code: 13650
- Website: Official website

Puerto Lápice is a municipality of Spain located in the province of Ciudad Real, Castilla–La Mancha. The municipality spans across a total area of 54.84 km^{2} and, as of 1 January 2020, it has a registered population of 891.

Already since the 13th century, the territory of Puerto Lápice was part of the Campo de San Juan, the extensive territory under the seigneurial jurisdiction of the Knights Hospitaller in the lands of La Mancha. In Miguel de Cervantes’ novel Don Quixote, it is the second town to which Quixote and Sancho Panza travel together.

On 2007, there was a meteorite fall near this town.
