= List of Spanish generals of the Peninsular War =

The following list of Spanish general officers (Peninsular War) lists the generals and other general officers who served in the Army of Spain during the Peninsular War (1808–1814). The rank given refers to the ones held until the end of the war in 1814. The list includes foreign nationals who fought in Spanish military units.

== Overview ==
Napoleon had intended the campaign on the Peninsula to be a walkover, but what he would come to call the Spanish Ulcer, ended up with him having to send in thirteen of his maréchals, and enter Madrid himself. Apart from the original 28,000 troops that had entered Spain under Junot, heading for Portugal, he would have to send in a further two hundred and seventy thousand men — more than half of the empire’s total military strength.

== List ==
Name	Command	Action seen	Notes
Abadía (1770–1836) (lieutenant general)		Bailén (Battle of); Uclés (Battle of)	
Acevedo (1726–1808) (general)		Battle of Valmaseda; Battle of Espinosa– WiA/KiA	Badly wounded at Espinosa, he was killed shortly afterwards when he and his second-in-command, then-Captain Riego, were captured. Riego was taken prisoner and sent to France.
Alava (1770–1843) (general)		Salamanca (Battle of); Vitoria (Battle of); Bussaco (Battle of); Ciudad Rodrigo (Siege of); Badajoz (Siege of);	Alava was the liaison with the British headquarters, and became one of Wellington's aides-de-camp, spending the Peninsular War attached to Wellington's staff.
Alburquerque (1775–1811) (general)		Talavera (Battle of); Arzobispo (Battle of);	
Alcedo (1735–1812)	Governor of La Coruña	Battle of La Coruña	Alcedo's garrison was able to hold back Marshall Soult's forces while Sir John Moore's troops embarked for Britain, following the Battle of Corunna. He finally surrendered on 18 January 1809.
Álvarez de Castro (1749–1810) (general)	Army of Catalonia and Governor of Girona	Gerona (Third siege of) – PoW (died in captivity)	As commander of Montjuïc Castle in Barcelona, Álvarez had been prepared to resist the French occupation of the city. When his superiors ordered him to hand it over to French troops without resistance, Álvarez fled to Girona where, with only 5,600 men under arms, the city resisted over the next seven months against 18,000 French troops.
Anglona (1786–1851)		Tamames (Battle of); Alba de Tormes (Battle of); Barrosa (Battle of);	On 30 October 1812, he was sent by the Cortes of Cádiz to arrest General Francisco Ballesteros, commander of the 4th Army who, earlier that month, had called for a military uprising in protest against Wellington's appointment as generalissimo of the Spanish Army.
Aréizaga (before 1775–1816) (general)		Alcañiz (Battle of); Ocana (Battle of);	
Ballesteros (1770–1832) (general)	4th Army	Albuera (Battle of);	Ballesteros was arrested and relieved of his command in October 1812, and exiled for protesting against Wellington having been named generalissimo (supreme commander) of the Spanish armies on 22 September 1812 and for trying to instigate an uprising.
Bárcena (1768–1836) (field marshal)		Valmaseda (Battle of); Astorga (Siege of); Burgos (Siege of); Bidassoa (Battle of); Nivelle (Battle of)	
Belestá (1741–1819) (general)		Portugal (Invasion of)	
Blake (1759–1827) (general)	Army of Galicia	Medina del Rio Seco (Battle of); Zornoza (Battle of); Valmaseda (Battle of); Espinosa (Battle of); Albuera (Battle of); Valencia (Siege of) – PoW	
Caldagues (1752–c.1824) (major general)		Girona (Second siege of); Cardedeu (Battle of); Molins de Rei (Battle of)	
Carrafa (1755–1825?) (general)		Portugal (Invasion of)	
Carlos de España (1775–1839) (general)		Battle of the Gebora; Albuera (Battle of) WiA; Badajoz (Siege of) WiA; Salamanca (Battle of); Pamplona (Siege of) WiA; Bayonne (Battle of); Vitoria (Battle of)	Also known as Charles d'Espagne, but Wellington refers to him as Carlos de España.
Cartaojal (1761–1833) (general)	Army of the Centre	Yébenes (Battle of); Ciudad Real (Battle of)	Replaced after his defeat at Ciudad Real.
Castaños (1758–1852) (general)	Army of Andalusia	Bailén (Battle of); Tudela (Battle of); Somosierra (Battle of);	
Coupigny) (1761–1825) (lieutenant general)		Bailén (Battle of); Tudela (Battle of); Albuera (Battle of);	
Cuesta (1741–1811) (general)	Commander-in-Chief of the Army of Spain; Army of Extremadura	Cabezón (Battle of); Medina de Rioseco (Battle of); Medellín (Battle of) – WiA; Talavera (Battle of);	
Eroles (1784–1825)		Molins de Rey (Battle of); Gerona (Siege of) – PoW; Raid of La Junquera; Montserrat (Battle of); Col de Balaguer (Battle of); Altafulla (Battle of); Roda de Isábena (Battle of)	
Freire (1765 or 1767–1834 or 1835) (general)	Commander-in-Chief of the IV Army; Army of Galicia	Talavera (Battle of); San Marcial (Battle of); Bidassoa (Battle of the); Nivelle (Battle of the); Toulouse (Battle of);	
Girón (1778–1842) (general)		Bailén (Battle of); Tudela (Battle of); Uclés (Battle of); Albuera (Battle of); Bidassoa (Battle of the); Nivelle (Battle of the);	
García Conde (1767–1820) (major general)		(Battle of) (1809); Gerona (Siege of) (1809); Lérida (Siege of)	
González Lubie (c. 1748–1833) (general)		Lérida (Siege of)	
Imaz (1761–1828) (general)		Badajoz (First siege of)	
Infantado (1768–1841) (general)		Uclés (Battle of);	Replaced after his defeat at Ucles.
Jáuregui (1791–1844) (lieutenant colonel)		San Marcial (Battle of);	
Lacy (1772–1817) (general)		Ocana (Battle of)	
Llamas (general)			Llamas' divisions from Valencia and Murcia were incorporated into the Army of the Centre
Longa (1783–1831) (general)		Vitoria (Battle of); Bidassoa (Battle of the); Pyrenees (Battle of the); San Marcial (Battle of)	
Losada (1777–1847) (field marshal)		Zornoza; Balmaseda; Espinosa de los Monteros; Villafranca; Tamames; Alba de Tormes; Medina del Campo; San Marcial; Tordesillas	
Menacho (died 3 March 1811) (general)		Badajoz (First siege of) – KiA	Menacho was the commander of the garrison at Badajoz.
Mendizábal (1765–1838) (general)		Gebora (Battle of the); Albuera (Battle of); San Marcial (Battle of);	
Mendoza (1733–1809) (major general)			
Morillo (1775–1837) (general)		Puente Sanpayo (Battle of); Vitoria (Battle of)	
O'Donnell (1769–1834) (general)			
O'Donojú (1762–1821) (general)		Zaragoza (First Siege of) – PoW	O'Donojú was appointed minister of war by the Cortes of Cádiz.
O'Neill (1736–1814)			
O'Neylle (1765–1809) (general)		Tudela (Battle of)	
Palacio (1744–1816)			
Parque (1755–1824)		Tamames (Battle of); El Carpio (Battle of); Alba de Tormes (Battle of);	
Peña (1808–1811) (general)		Cádiz (Siege of); Barrosa (Battle of);	
Perena (1764–1834) (lieutenant general)		Zaragoza (Second siege of); Leciñena (Battle of); Lérida (Siege of)	
Reding (1755–1809) (general)	3rd Swiss Regiment Reding	Bailén (Battle of); Valls (Battle of) – DoW	
Riego (1784–1823) (general)		Battle of Espinosa – PoW	He took command of the Spanish forces at Espinosa when his commanding officer, General Acevedo, was badly wounded. Both were later captured shortly afterwards, and Acevedo was killed. Riego was taken prisoner and sent to France.
Romana (1761–1811) (general)	Army of Galicia (from Blake)	Evacuation of the La Romana Division; Villafranca (Battle of);	Also referred to as Marquis of Romana.
Saint-Marcq (1762–1831)		Valencia (Battle of); Zaragoza (Siege of) – PoW	
San Juan (before 1790–1809) (general)		Somosierra (Battle of) – WiA	Routed at Somosierra (allowing Napoleon to enter Madrid on 4 November 1808), San Juan withdrew to Talavera, where he was killed by a mob of his own troops, mainly untrained men conscripted specifically for the battle at Somosierra.
Santocildes (1771–1847) (general)		Tordesillas (Battle of)	
Solano (1768–1808) (general)	Captain-General of Andalusia and Governor of Cádiz	Portugal (Invasion of)	The once-popular Solano was lynched by a mob, accused of being an afrancesado and after having tried to dissuade the population from attacking the Rosily Squadron.
Taboada (general)		Cogorderos (Battle of)	
Taranco (died 1809) (general)		Portugal (Invasion of)	
Torrijos (1791–1831) (general)		Vitoria (Battle of);	
Veguer (fl. 18th century–19th century) (colonel)		(Battle of); Zaragoza (Second siege of); Lérida (Siege of)	
Venegas (1754–1838) (general)		Bailén (Battle of); Uclés (Battle of); Almonacid (Battle of);	Replaced after his defeat at Almonacid.
Vigodet (1747–1834) (general)		Almonacid (Battle of); Ocana (Battle of);	Also referred to as Gaspar de Bigodé.
Vives (1764–1809) (general)		Cardadeu (Battle of); Molins de Rey (Battle of);	
Vivot (general)			
Whittingham (1772–1841) (general)		Bailén (Battle of); Medellin (Battle of); Barrosa (Battle of); Xegona (Battle of); Concentayña (Battle of)– WiA; Castalla (Battle of)	
Worster (1765–1819) (lieutenant general)			
Zayas (1772–1827)		Ocaña (Battle of); Albuera (Battle of);	

== See also ==
- Chronology of events of the Peninsular War
- List of French general officers (Peninsular War)
- List of Portuguese general officers (Peninsular War)
