= List of French generals of the Peninsular War =

The following list of French general officers (Peninsular War) lists the générals (général de brigade and général de division) and maréchals d'Empire, that is, the French general officers who served in the First French Empire's Grande Armée in Spain and Portugal during the Peninsular War (1808–1814). The rank given refers to that held until 1814. The list includes foreign nationals who fought in French military units.

== Overview ==
Napoleon had intended the campaign on the Peninsula to be a walkover, but what he would come to call the Spanish Ulcer, ended up with him having had to send in thirteen of his maréchals (ten of whom were of the first promotion – of fourteen – and included Soult, one of only six men to have been appointed Marshal General of France in the history of France), as well as two "honorary" marshals, Kellermann and Lefebvre, and enter Madrid himself. Apart from the original 28,000 troops that had entered Spain under Junot, heading for Portugal, Napoleon would have to send in a further two hundred and seventy thousand men — more than half of the empire's total military strength.

== List ==
Name	Command	Action seen	Notes
Abbé (1764–1834) (general of brigade)	3rd Division / IX Corps	La Bisbal (Battle of); Tortosa (Siege of); Tarragona (Siege of); Montserrat (Battle of); Pyrenees (Battle of the); San Marcial (Battle of); Bidassoa (Battle of the); Nivelle (Battle of); Nive (Battle of the); Bayonne (Battle of);	
Alorna (Marquis of) (1754–1813) (lieutenant general / general of division)	Portuguese Legion		
Arenberg (1785–1861) (colonel)	Chevau-Légers d'Arenberg	Arroyo dos Molinos (Battle of) – WiA/PoW;	Technically, a field officer, not a general officer, but as he led his own troops, the Chevau-Légers d'Arenberg, into battle, he is included in this list.
d'Aboville (1773–1820)		Corunna (Battle of); Talavera (Battle of); Vitoria (Battle of)	
d'Aigremont (1770–1827)		Maria (Battle of); Belchite (Battle of)	
Augereau (1764–1813) (general)	VII Corps	Gerona (Third Siege of)	
Baraguey d'Hilliers (1764–1813) (general of division)		Figueras (Siege of), 1811	Father of Achille Baraguey d'Hilliers (1795–1878), Marshal of France
Berthier (1753–1815) (marshal – first promotion)	Napoleon's Chief of staff		
Bessières, Bertrand (1773–1855) (general)	7th Division / Army of Spain	Molins de Rey (Battle of);	Younger brother of Marshal Jean-Baptiste Bessières.
Bessières, Jean-Baptiste (1768–1813) (marshal – first promotion)	Army of the North	Cabezón (Battle of);	Elder brother of General Bertrand Bessières.
Bonet (1768–1857) (general of division)	8th Division / Army of Portugal	Salamanca (Battle of) – WiA;	Took over command at Salamanca when his superior, Marmont, was wounded.
Boussart (1758–1813) (general of division)	Cavalry Division / Army of Aragon	Bailén (Battle of) – PoW; Valencia (Siege of) – WiA; Castalla (Battle of) – DoW;	
Bouvier des Éclaz (1757–1830) (general of brigade)	3rd Dragoon Brigade / Cavalry Division / Army of the Midi	Usagre (Battle of);	
Boyer (general of brigade)	Dragoon Division / Army of Portugal	Venta del Pozo (Battle of);	
Brenier (1767–1832) (general of division)	6th Division / Army of Portugal	Portugal (Invasion of); Vimeiro (Battle of) – WiA/PoW; Almeida (First siege of); Almeida (Second siege of); Battle of Salamanca;	
Briche (1772–1825) (general of brigade)	1st Dragoon Brigade / Cavalry Division / Army of the Midi	Gebora (Battle of the); Albuera (Battle of);	
Bron (1757–1847) (general of brigade)	2nd Dragoon Brigade / Cavalry Division / Army of the Midi	Usagre (Battle of); Arroyo dos Molinos (Battle of) – PoW;	
Carrié (general of brigade)	Auxiliary Brigade / Kellermann's Command (1810)	Astorga (Combat of); Alba de Tormes (Battle of) – PoW	Carrié served under General Kellerman
Cassagne (1774–1841) (general of brigade)	1st Brigade / 2nd Division / Army of Andalusia		
Cavrois (1774–1820) (general of brigade)	2nd Brigade / Cavalry / Army of Portugal		
Chabran (1763–1843) (general of division)	Division / VII Corps	Bruch (First battle of); Molins de Rey (Battle of);	
Chassé (1765–1849) (general)	Dutch Brigade	Zornoza (Battle of); Talavera (Battle of); Ocana (Battle of); Vitoria (Battle of); Maya (Battle of);	
Clausel (1772–1842) (general of division)	Army of the North	Salamanca (Battle of);	Clausel took over the command at Salamanca when his two superiors, Marshal Marmont and General Bonet, were both wounded by shrapnel.
Compère (1774–1812) (general of brigade)	Neapolitan Division	Valencia (Siege of);	
Conroux (1770–1813) (general of division)	2nd Division / IX Corps	Fuentes de Onoro (Battle of); Bornos (Second battle of); Vitoria (Battle of); Pyrenees (Battle of the); San Marcial (Battle of); Bidassoa (Battle of the); Nivelle (Battle of) – DoW;	
Curto (general of brigade)	Light Cavalry Division / Army of Portugal	Venta del Pozo (Battle of); Salamanca (Battle of); Vitoria (Battle of);	
Debelle (1770–1826) (general)		Sahagún (Battle of);	
Decaen (1769–1832) (general)			
Delaborde (1764–1833) (general)		Roliça (Battle of); Vimeiro (Battle of) – WiA; Corunna (Battle of); Porto (First battle of); Porto (Second battle of);	Delaborde led divisions during the Invasion of Portugal under Junot and later under Soult.
Dessolles (1767–1828) (general)		Almonacid (Battle of); Ocaña (Battle of)	
Drouet (1765–1844) (general)	IX Corps; V Corps (Army of the South); Army of Portugal; Army of the centre (at Vitoria)	Fuentes de Oñoro (Battle of); Vitoria (Battle of); Maya (Battle of);	
Dubreton (1773–1855) (General)		Burgos (Siege of);	
Duhesme (1766–1815) (general)		Gerona (Battle of); Gerona (Second siege of);	
Dulauloy (1761–1832) (general)			
Dupont (1765–1840) (general)		Alcolea Bridge (Battle of); Córdoba (Capture of); Bailén (Battle of);	
Duprès (1755–1808) (general)		Alcolea Bridge (Battle of); Córdoba (Capture of); Bailén (Battle of) – KiA;	Duprès is also referred to as Dupré.
Ferey (1771–1812) (general)		Bussaco (Battle of); Casal Novo (Battle of); Fuentes de Onoro (Battle of); Salamanca (Battle of) – KiA;	
Filangieri (1784–1867) (general)			He was sent back to Italy after having killed General François Franceschi-Losio in a duel in 1810.
Foy (1775–1825) (general)		Vimeiro (Battle of)– WiA; Corunna (Battle of); Porto (First battle of); Porto (Second battle of) – WiA; Buçaco (Battle of) – WiA; Salamanca (Battle of); Garcia Hernandez (Battle of); Pyrenees (Battle of the);	
Franceschi, Jean Baptiste (1766–1813) (general)		Mansilla (Battle of);	Served in the Peninsular War from 1807 to 1809
Franceschi-Delonne, Jean Baptiste Marie (1767–1810) (general)	Second French invasion of Portugal		Served on the staff of King Joseph Bonaparte. Served under Soult during the invasion of Portugal. Captured by the Spaniards, he died in prison at Cartagena
Franceschi-Losio, François (1770–1810) (general)			Served on the staff of King Joseph Bonaparte. He was killed by Carlo Filangieri in a duel at Vitoria in 1810.
Gazan (1765–1845) (general)	Army of the South (at Vitoria); Army of Spain	Albuera (Battle of); Vitoria (Battle of);	
Girard (1775–1815) (general)		Albuera (Battle of); Arroyo dos Molinos (Battle of);	
Gobert (1760–1808) (general)		Bailén (Battle of) – DoW	
Godinot (1765–1811) (general)		Albuera (Battle of); Zujar (Battle of); Bornos (Battle of);	
Gouvion-Saint-Cyr (1764–1830) (general)		Cardadeu (Battle of); Molins de Rey (Battle of);	
Grouchy (1766–1847) (general)			Following the Dos de Mayo Uprising in Madrid in 1808, Grouchy, acting on orders of Joachim Murat, presided over the court-martial that ordered the execution of all Spaniards captured bearing arms, as depicted by Goya in The Third of May 1808.
Habert (1773–1825) (general)		Lerida (Siege of); Tortosa (Siege of); Tarragona (Siege of); Saguntum (Battle of); Valencia (Siege of); Castalla (Battle of); Ordal (Battle of);	
Harispe (1768–1855) (general)		Margalef (Battle of);	
Jourdan (1762–1833) (marshal – first promotion)		Talavera (Battle of); Vitoria (Battle of);	
Julienne (1775–1838) (general)		Talavera (Battle of); Almonacid (Battle of);	
Junot (1771–1813) (general)		Vimeiro (Battle of); Astorga (Siege of); Sobral (Battle of);	
Kellermann (1770–1835) (general)		Alba de Tormes (Battle of)	
Lagrange (1763–1836) (general)			
La Houssaye (1768–1848) (general)		Corunna (Battle of); Braga (Battle of); Porto (First Battle of); Second Porto (Second Battle of); Arzobispo (Battle of);	
Lallemand (1774–1839) (general)		Maguilla (Battle of);	
Lannes (1769–1809) (marshal – first promotion)		Tudela (Battle of); Zaragoza (Second siege of);	
Lapisse (1762–1809) (general)		Espinosa (Battle of); Talavera (Battle of) – DoW;	
Lasalle (1775–1809) (general)		Cabezón (Battle of);	
Latour-Maubourg (1768–1834) (general)		Uclés (Battle of); Villafranca (Battle of); Medellín (Battle of); Talavera (Battle of); Ocana (Battle of); Gebora (Battle of); Albuera (Battle of); Usagre (Battle of); Villafranca (Battle of) – WiA;	
Lebrun (1768–1848) (general)		Corunna (Battle of); Braga (Battle of); Porto (First battle of); Porto (Second battle of); Arzobispo (Battle of);	
Lechi (or Lecchi) (1766–1836) (general)	2nd Division (Duhesme's Corps of Observation of the Eastern Pyrenees); 6th Division (Gouvion St. Cyr's 7th Corps		Lechi commanded the 3,500 Swiss and Italian troops garrisoned at the Citadel of Bercelona.
Lefebvre-Desnouettes (1773–1822) (general)		Tudela (Battle of); Zornoza (Battle of); Zaragoza (First siege of); Benavente (Battle of) – PoW;	
Leval (1762–1834) (general)		Zornoza (Battle of); Medellín (Battle of); Talavera (Battle of); Almonacid (Battle of); Ocaña (Battle of); Barrosa (Battle of); Tarifa (Siege of); Vitoria (Battle of);	
Liger-Belair (1772–1835) (general of division)		Valdepeñas (Uprising of); Bailén (Battle of);	
Loison (1771–1816) (general)		Évora (Battle of);	
Lorge (1767–1826) (general)		Corunna (Battle of);	
MacDonald (1765–1840) (general)		La Bisbal (Battle of);	
Maransin (1770–1828) (general)		Albuera (Battle of)	
Marescot (1758–1832) (general)		Bailén (Battle of);	
Marmont (1774–1852) (marshal – third promotion)		Ciudad Rodrigo (Siege of); Salamanca (Battle of) – WiA	
Masséna (1758–1817) (marshal – first promotion)		Ciudad Rodrigo (Siege of); Almeida (Siege of); Buçaco (Battle of); Sabugal (Battle of); Fuentes de Oñoro (Battle of);	Following his victory at Buçaco, he forced the allies to retreat into the Lines of Torres Vedras.
Mathieu (1768–1833) (general of division)	1st Division of the III Corps (1808); VI Corps (1809); Army of Catalonia (1811–1813)	Tudela (Battle of); Alba de Tormes (Battle of); Fort Monjuich (Battle of); Montserrat (Battle of); Altafulla (Battle of); Tarragona (Siege of)	
Merle (1766–1830) (general)		Medina de Rioseco (Battle of); Corunna (Battle of); Porto (First battle of); Porto (Second battle of); Buçaco (Battle of); Sabugal (Battle of); Fuentes de Oñoro (Battle of);	
Merlin (Antoine François) (1778–1854) (general)		Salamanca (Battle of);	
Merlin (Christophe-Antoine) (1771–1839) (general)		Talavera (Battle of); Almonacid (Battle of); Ocana (Battle of);	
Mermet; 1772–1837) (general)		Porto (First battle of); Grijó (Battle of); Porto (Second battle of); Ciudad Rodrigo (Siege of ); Almeida (Siege of ), the Côa (Battle of the); Buçaco (Battle of); Redinha (Battle of); Fuentes de Oñoro (Battle of); Vitoria (Battle of);	
Milhaud (1766–1833) (general)		Almonacid (Battle of);	
Moncey (marshal – first promotion)		Zaragoza (Second siege of);	
Montbrun (1770–1812) (general)		Somosierra (Battle of); Bussaco (Battle of); Fuentes de Onoro (Battle of);	
Mortier (marshal – first promotion)	V Corps	Zaragoza (Second siege of); Campo Maior Castle (Siege of);	
Murat (marshal – first promotion)		Dos de Mayo Uprising;	
Musnier (1766–1837) (general)	1st Division, Moncey's Corps of Observation of the Ocean Coast; 2nd Division, III Corps (Grande Armée)	Margalef (Battle of); Valencia (Battle of); Zaragoza (First siege of); Zaragoza (Second siege of); Alcañiz (Battle of); María (Battle of); Belchite (Battle of); Lérida (Siege of); Tortosa (Siege of); Saguntum (Battle of); Valencia (Siege of)	
Napoleon I (1769–1821)			
Ney (marshal – first promotion)		Tudela (Battle of); River Côa (Battle of the); Almeida (First siege of);	
Ormancey (1754–1824) (general)		Talavera (Battle of);	
Pannetier (1769–1843) (general)		Alcolea Bridge (Battle of); Córdoba (Capture of); Bailén (Battle of);	
Philippon (1761–1836) (general)		Talavera (Battle of); Cádiz (Siege of); Gebora (Battle of the); Badajoz (First siege of); Badajoz (Second siege of); Albuera (Battle of);	
Popon (1772–1824) (general)		Tamames (Battle of); Alba de Tormes (Battle of); Ciudad Rodrigo (Siege of); Almeida (Siege of); Buçaco (Battle of); Casal Novo (Battle of); Fuentes de Onoro (Battle of); Salamanca (Battle of); San Millan-Osma (Battle of); Tolosa (Battle of); Sorauren (Battle of); Bidassoa (Battle of the);	
Pryvé (1762–1831) (general)		Alcolea Bridge (Battle of); Córdoba (Capture of); Bailén (Battle of);	
Quesnel (1765–1819) (general)		Portugal (1807 Invasion of) – PoW; Portugal (1809 Invasion of); Figueras (Siege of)	Following the Invasion of Portugal, he was appointed Governor of Porto. Quesnel and his 30-man dragoon escort were captured on 6 June 1808 when news of the uprising in Spain reached the Spanish General Belestá, whose 6,000 troops were garrisoned in the city. After being handed over to the British at Corunna, he was freed by French soldiers on 16 January 1809.
Reille (general)		Gerona (Second siege of); Vitoria (Battle of);	
Rey (1768–1846) (general)		Ocaña Battle of; Baza (Battle of); Tarragona (Siege of); San Sebastián (Siege of) – PoW; Orthez (Battle of); Toulouse (Battle of)	
Roize (1778–1847) (general)		Valdepeñas (Uprising of);	
Rosily (1748–1832) (vice admiral)		Capture of Rosily Squadron – PoW;	
Rouyer (1765–1824) (general)			
Ruffin (1771–1811) (general)	I Corps	Somosierra (Battle of); Uclés (Battle of); Medellin (Battle of); Talavera (Battle of); Barrosa (Battle of) – WiA/PoW/DoW	
Ruty (1774–1828) (general)		Ciudad Rodrigo (Siege of); Almeida (Siege of); Albuera (Battle of);	
Sarrut (1765–1813) (general)		Buçaco (Battle of); Fuentes de Onoro (Battle of); Salamanca (Battle of); San Millan-Osma (Battle of); Vitoria (Battle of) – DoW	
Schwarz (1762–1826) (general)		Bruch (First battle of); Manresa (Battle of); La Bisbal (Battle of)– PoW	
Sébastiani (1771–1851) (general)	IV Corps	Zornoza (Battle of); Ciudad Real (Battle of); Talavera (Battle of); Almonacid (Battle of);	
Solignac (1773–1850) (general)		Vimeiro (Battle of);	
Souham (1760–1837) (general)		Venta del Pozo (Battle of); Vich (Battle of) – WiA;	
Soult (marshal – first promotion)		Badajoz (Siege of); Corunna (Battle of); Albuera (Battle of); Pyrenees (Battle of the);	
Strolz (1771–1841) (general)		Talavera (Battle of); Almonacid (Battle of);	
Suchet (1770–1826) (marshal – fourth promotion)	III Corps	Lérida (Siege of); Tarragona (Siege of)	
Taupin (1767–1814) (general)		Bussaco (Battle of); Salamanca (Battle of); Vitoria (Battle of); Pyrenees (Battle of the); San Marcial (Battle of); Bidassoa (Battle of the); Nivelle (Battle of); Nive (Battle of the); Orthez (Battle of); Toulouse (Battle of) – KiA;	
Thomières (1771–1812) (general)		Invasion of Portugal (1807); Roliça (Battle of); Vimeiro (Battle of) – WiA; Corunna (Battle of); Bussaco (Battle of); Fuentes de Onoro (Battle of); Salamanca (Battle of) – KiA;	
Trelliard (1764–1832) (general)		Majadahonda (Battle of); Vitoria (Battle of); the Pyrenees (Battle of);	
Valletaux (1773–1811)		Cogorderos (Battle of) – KiA;	
Vandermaesen (–1767–1813) (general)		San Marcial (Battle of) – KiA;	
Vedel (general)		Puerta del Rey; Bailén (Battle of);	
Verdier (general)		Zaragoza (First siege of);	
Victor (marshal – second promotion)		Valmaseda (Battle of); Battle of Espinosa; Barrosa (Battle of);	
Villatte (1770–1834) (general)		Zornoza (Battle of); Valmaseda (Battle of); Barrosa (Battle of); Espinosa (Battle of) Uclés (Battle of); Medellin (Battle of); Talavera (Battle of); Vitoria (Battle of); Pyrenees (Battle of the); Bidassoa (Battle of the); Nivelle (Battle of the); Nive (Battle of the); Orthez (Battle of); Toulouse (Battle of);	
Wathier (1770–1846) (general)			
Werlé (1763–1811) (general)		Ocana (Battle of); Albuera (Battle of) – KiA;	

== See also ==
- Chronology of events of the Peninsular War
- List of Portuguese general officers (Peninsular War)
- List of Spanish general officers (Peninsular War)
- List of French generals of the Revolutionary and Napoleonic Wars
