= Pedro de la Bárcena =

Spanish army officer (1768–1836)

- Born: 1768; Berodia, Asturias, Spain
- Died: 19 November 1836 (aged 67–68); Oviedo, Asturias
- Military career
- Conflicts: War of the Pyrenees; Battle of the Baztan Valley; Anglo-Spanish War (1796–1808); Peninsular War; Battle of Valmaseda; Siege of Astorga (1812); Siege of Burgos; Battle of the Bidassoa; Battle of Nivelle; Hundred Days

Pedro de la Bárcena y Valdivielso (1768–1836) was a Spanish military commander active during the Peninsular War.

== Early career ==
Bárcena enlisted as a second lieutenant in the Provincial Regiment of Oviedo in 1788. In 1793 he was promoted to second lieutenant of Grenadiers.

During the War of the Pyrenees he saw action several times, including at the combat of Sara (1 May 1793) and at Baztán, where he distinguished himself. He was promoted to Fusiliers lieutenant in 1795, Grenadiers lieutenant the following year and captain at the end of the war.

In 1800 he was promoted to Fusiliers captain and from December that year to the following December, he took part in guarding the coast of Asturias, duties he again took up during the latter part of the Anglo-Spanish War (1796–1808).

== Peninsular War (1807–1814) ==
At the start of the war, the Junta de Asturias promoted him to colonel and sargento mayor of the newly established Infiesto Regiment. Shortly thereafter, he was promoted to lieutenant colonel and then colonel of the Candás and Luanco Regiment, which was subsequently incorporated into the Army of the Left. He saw action at Valmaseda (November 1808). In December he was given command of the battalion of Cazadores de Fernando VII (light infantry) and marched to defend the line of the river Eo, which forms the boundary between Galicia and Asturias, where he served under lieutenant general José Worster.

On 2 June 1809, he defeated General Barthélemy Thomières's troops at the bridge of San Martin, for which he was promoted to brigadier and given the command of the Army of Asturias.

Although he distinguished himself at Potes (23 September 1809), the following year his troops were beaten by General Bonet's troops at the bridge of Colloto, five kilometres (3.1 miles) outside Oviedo (14 February 1810). (Note: Having captured Oviedo on 31 January 1810, Bonet was forced to abandon the city when Juan Díaz Porlier captured Infiesto and Gijon, and effectively cut off the French commander's communication with Santander. When Bonet headed off to give chase to Porlier, General Bárcena was able to take the capital. Following his victory at Colloto, Bonet was able to regain the city. (Oman, 1908: p. 218.))

His troops saw action at Peñaflor (19 March), were victorious at the combat of Padrún (14 April), but were unable to hold the line at the line at Nalón (26 April), and were forced to retreat to Mieres. On reorganising his troops, Bárcena was victorious at the actions of Linares de Cornellana and Campomanes, on 15 and 24 August, respectively.

In September, Bárcena handed over his command to General Francisco Javier Losada.

At the head of the vanguard division, Bárcena fought several actions at Pola de Lena (1, 2, 6 and 15 October 1810); at Fresno (20 and 28 November); at Soto (26–28 December); at Campomanes (1 January 1811); at Salas (8 March) and at Puelo, the same day, where he was badly wounded.

While still recovering from his wound, in May 1811 he was given command of the 1st Asturias Regiment, still under the orders of Losada. The following June he was promoted to field marshal and given command of the 1st Section of the 1st Division.

On 5 and 7 November, his troops saw action at Puente de los Fierros and at Peñaflor. On 12 November he forced General Gauthier to withdraw from Tineo.

In May 1812 he was appointed commander of the 1st Division and spearheaded the campaign (May–June 1812) which led to the French being forced to withdraw from Asturias. He participated at the Siege of Astorga and then marched to Burgos to bolster General Arthur Wellesley, Marquess of Wellington's siege of Burgos, withdrawing with Wellington to Salamanca and then Ciudad Rodrigo. From there, he set up his cantonment in Bierzo, region of which he was appointed commander-in-chief.

In July 1813, he commanded the 4th Division of the 4th Army, under Girón, at the Bidassoa and later distinguished himself, together with Francisco de Longa, at the bridge of Yanci, on 1 August. The following September, he was given command of three divisions of the Army of the centre (the 3rd, under Diego del Barco; the 4th, under José María Ezpeleta and the 5th, under Juan Díaz Porlier) seeing action at the Battle of the Bidassoa (7 October) and Battle of Nivelle (10 November). At the Battle of Toulouse (1814), was second-in-command to General Freire.

== Post-war career ==
During the Hundred Days he was given command of the troops stationed in the Baztán Valley and entered into France at their head. He was then given command of the región (cantón) of Pamplona, until October, when he was given the interim command of the 2nd Division, before returning to Asturias in December.

In 1816, on the occasion of the wedding between Fernando VII and Maria Isabel of Braganza, Bárcena was promoted to lieutenant general.

In 1818, he was briefly given command of the coast of Asturias to prevent the eventual landing there of general Mariano Renovales's liberal troops sailing from England.

When the Constitution was proclaimed, under the Liberal Triennium, he was briefly appointed captain general of Galicia.
