= Lists of military commanders =

This is a list of lists of military commanders.

== Africa ==
- List of warlords in the Central African Republic
- List of Ambazonian commanders in the Anglophone Crisis

== Asia ==
- List of generals of the People's Republic of China
- List of generals of Ranjit Singh

== Europe ==
- List of French generals of the Revolutionary and Napoleonic Wars
- List of French general officers (Peninsular War)
- List of generals of the Lithuanian Army
- List of Portuguese general officers (Peninsular War)
- List of Spanish general officers (Peninsular War)

== North America ==
- List of American Civil War generals (Confederate)
- List of American Civil War generals (Acting Confederate)
- List of American Civil War generals (Union)
- List of American Civil War brevet generals (Union)
- List of female United States military generals and flag officers

== South America ==
- List of generals of the Empire of Brazil
