= Gaspar de Jáuregui =

Spanish guerrilla leader and army officer (1791–1844)

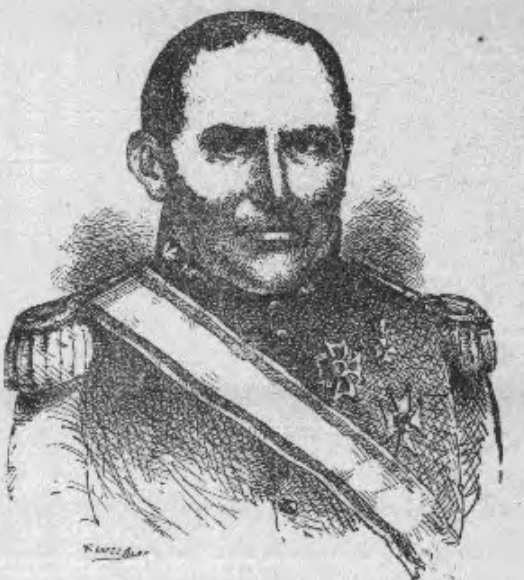
- Portrait of Gaspar de Jáuregui in Iconografía biográfica de Guipúzcoa (1898), by Francisco López Alén (1866-1910)
- Born: 19 September 1791; Villarreal de Urrechu (Guipúzcoa), Spain
- Died: 18 December 1844 (aged 53) Vitoria (Álava)
- Rank: mariscal de campo and captain-general
- Conflicts: Peninsular War; Battle of San Marcial; First Carlist War

Gaspar de Jáuregui (19 September 1791 – 19 December 1844), also known as "El Pastor" ['The Shepherd'], was one of many Spanish guerrilleros who came to prominence in the Spanish War of Independence. He was appointed Captain general of the Provincias Vascongadas in 1843.

== Early life ==
The only biographical details that are known about Jáuregi before he came to prominence as a guerrillero is that he worked as a postman. Likewise, the only documentation that refers to his nickname "El Pastor" ["The Shepherd"] as his profession, is based on the fact that cattle figure among the assets declared by his parents.

== Military career ==
=== Peninsular War ===
His service record shows that he joined a provincial volunteer unit in August 1809. That year and the next, he participated in over twenty raids and ambishes on French convoys and garrisons in Vizcaya, Guipúzcoa and Navarra. By May 1810, he had been promoted to lieutenant and at the end of that year, Francisco Espoz y Mina, commander-in-chief of the Corso Terrestre in Navarre, authorised him to set up the first Volunteer Battalion of Guipúzcoa. In January 1812, he was badly wounded by a bullet to the chest.

Under the nominal command of Mendizabal, the scattered forces around Cantabria and Biscay consisted of the brigades of Porlier in the Eastern Asturias, and Longa in Cantabria, which were both integrated into the regular army, and the guerrilleros like Jauregui, Renovales, and the Curé Merino. In June 1812, Jáuregui participated in a joint operation with Sir Home Popham, whose squadron had sailed from Coruña, with Sir Howard Douglas and General Carrol, to co-operate with the guerrillas in occupying the French forces around Biscay and which would ultimately result in the capture of Santander (August 1812), a very good harbour which gave the allies free communication with England for stores and munitions. Popham's squadron included two line of battleships, five frigates and two sloops, carrying two battalions of marines, and a large number of small arms for the insurgents.

Meeting up at Lequeitio, once a breach had been made on the fort with the 24-pounder long gun that Popham had landed, the guerrillas stormed it, following which an attack was made on the convent, where the French commandant finally surrendered with 290 men. The muskets, stores, and three small guns [cannon], were given to Jáuregui. Popham's squadron then headed for Guetaria to meet up with another group of guerrilleros, an operation that had to be aborted, and the squadron then headed for Castro Urdiales, where Sir George Collier had landed a company of marines to assist Longa in another concerted attack. From there, the squadron went back to Guetaria in July for another concerted attack with Jáuregui, together with one of Mina's battalions, which finally arrived too late. Heavily outnumbered by Aussenac's flying column of 3,000 men, Jauregui was forced to flee and the British force lost two heavy guns and 32 men who were taken prisoner.

In October 1812, he was promoted to colonel, at the head of the 1st, 2nd and 3rd Volunteer Battalions of Guipúzcoa, each with a notional number of 1,200 troops, and which formed part of Gabriel de Mendizábal's 7th Army.

By August 1813, Jáuregui's battalions had been integrated into the 1st Brigade, 2nd Division of the 4th Army, which was active in the Frendh defeat at the Battle of San Marcial (31 de agosto de 1813).

At the end of the war, Jáuregui retired from the army and in October 1814, King Ferdinand VII appointed him Mayor of Urrechu, his place of birth.

=== Riego's uprising (1820) ===
Following Rafael del Riego's January uprising, and Ferdinand's acceptance, in March, of the 1812 Constitution, thereby ushering in the so-called Liberal Triennium, Jáuregui took command of a militia unit, seeing action in several military operations.

With the restoration of Ferdinand's absolute monarchy, Jáuregui was forced to flee into exile in France, from where he participated in some liberal plots with his former chief, Espoz y Mina, now exiled in England. Following Ferdinand's death, Jáuregui returned to Spain in October 1833.

=== First Carlist War ===
At the outbreak of the war, Jáuregui was promoted to brigadier and given command of a column of volunteers. In August 1836 he was promoted to mariscal de campo and given command of the 5th Division of the Army of the North.

== See also ==
- Guerrilla warfare in the Peninsular War
