= List of Portuguese generals of the Peninsular War =

The following list of Portuguese general officers (Peninsular War) lists the generals who served in the Portuguese forces in Spain and Portugal during the Peninsular War (1808–1814). The rank given refers to the ones held until the end of the war, in 1814. The list includes foreign nationals who fought in Portuguese military units.

It includes members of the Portuguese Legion (Legião Portuguesa), created by Napoleon in November 1807 and mobilized by Junot on occupying Portugal in 1807, as well as those that would later be incorporated into the Anglo-Portuguese Army, under Wellington, created on 22 April 1809.

== Overview ==
Napoleon had intended the campaign on the Peninsula to be a walkover, but what he would come to call the Spanish Ulcer, ended up with him having had to send in thirteen of his maréchals (ten of whom were of the first promotion – of fourteen), and enter Madrid himself. Apart from the original 28,000 troops that had entered Spain under Junot, heading for Portugal, he would have to send in a further two hundred and seventy thousand men — more than half of the empire's total military strength.

== List ==
Portrait	Name	Command	Action seen	Notes
	António de Lemos Pereira de Lacerda Delgado (1761–1828) (General)			
	António Marcelino da Vitória (1750–1825) (General)		Porto (Battle of);	
	António Soares de Noronha (1738–1814) (Lieutenant General)			
	Bernardim Freire de Andrade (1759–1809) (General)			Not to be confused with the Spanish general, Manuel Freire de Andrade. Bernardim Freire de Andrade was lynched by his own troops while they gathered for the Battle of Braga (1809).
	Caetano José Vaz Parreiras (17??–1811)		Porto (Battle of);	
	Carlos Frederico Lecor (1764–1836) (General)		Bussaco (Battle of); Lines of Torres Vedras; Vitoria (Battle of); Sorauren (Battle of); Nivelle (Battle of); Nive (Battle of the);	Having fled to England, Lecor participated there in the creation of the Loyal Lusitanian Legion. Lecor was the only non-British General to have commanded one of the Anglo-Portuguese divisions of Wellington's Peninsular Army (7th Division, in late 1813).
	Christian Adolph Friedrich Eben (1773–1825) (General)		Braga (Battle of);	
	Florêncio José Correia de Melo (?) (General)			
	Francisco de Melo da Cunha de Mendonça e Meneses (1761–1821) (Monteiro Mor)			
	Francisco de Paula Leite de Sousa (1747–1833) (General)			
	Francisco da Silveira (1763–1821) (General)		Chaves (Siege of); Porto (Second battle of); Vitoria (Battle of);	
	José Joaquim Champalimaud (1771–1825) (General)		Bussaco (Battle of)	
	José Maria de Moura (1772–1836) (General)			
	Luís Inocêncio Benedito de Castro (1777–1824) (General)			
	Luís do Rego Barreto (1777–1840) (General)			
	Manuel Jorge Gomes de Sepúlveda (1735–1814) (General)			
	Manuel Pamplona Carneiro Rangel (1774–1849) (General)			
	Manuel Pinto de Morais Bacelar (1741–1816) (General)			
	Miguel Pereira Forjaz (1769–1827) (General)			
	Matias José Dias Azedo (1758–1821) (General)			

== See also ==
- Chronology of events of the Peninsular War
- List of British general officers (Peninsular War)
- List of French general officers (Peninsular War)
- List of Spanish general officers (Peninsular War)
