= Aigremont =

Aigremont may refer to:

== People ==
- Édouard Michel du Faing d'Aigremont (1855–1931), a Belgian army officer and general during World War I
- Guillaume François d'Aigremont, (1770–1827), a French general de brigade (brigadier general)

== Places ==
=== Canada ===
- Aigremont Lake, Quebec

=== France ===
- Aigremont, Gard, in the Gard department
- Aigremont, Haute-Marne, in the Haute-Marne department
- Aigremont, Yonne, in the Yonne department
- Aigremont, Yvelines, in the Yvelines department
