= Louis Jean Nicolas Abbé =

French general (1764–1834)

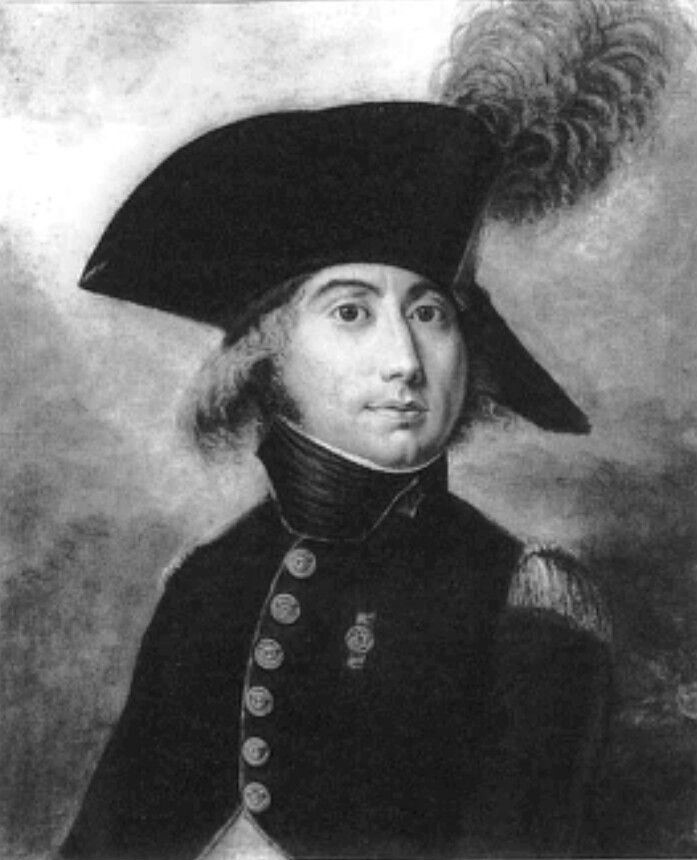
- Portrait of Louis Abbé
- Born: 28 August 1764; Trépail, France
- Died: 9 April 1834 (aged 69) Chalons-sur-Marne, France
- Allegiance: France
- Branch: Infantry
- Service years: 1784–1816, 1830–1832
- Rank: General of Division
- Conflicts: See list: French Revolutionary Wars; Italian campaigns; Saint-Domingue expedition; War of the Third Coalition; Battle of Caldiero; Battle of Campo Tenese; Battle of Maida; Siege of Amantea; War of the Fifth Coalition; Battle of Sacile; Battle of Caldiero; Battle of Piave River; Battle of Tarvis; Battle of Raab; Battle of Wagram; Peninsular War; Battle of La Bisbal; Siege of Tortosa; Siege of Tarragona; Battle of Montserrat; Battle of the Pyrenees; Battle of San Marcial; Battle of the Bidassoa; Battle of Nivelle; Battle of the Nive; Battle of Bayonne; Action of Dannemarie
- Awards: Légion d'Honneur, CC 1808; Order of Saint-Louis, 1814
- Other work: Baron of the Empire, 1810

Louis Jean Nicolas, baron Abbé (French pronunciation: [lwi ʒɑ̃ nikɔlɑ abe]; 28 August 1764 – 9 April 1834) was a French general during the Napoleonic Wars. He enlisted as a foot soldier in the royal army in 1784 and was a non-commissioned officer by 1792. He spent most of the French Revolutionary Wars fighting in Italy. In 1802 he joined the Saint-Domingue expedition. He was appointed colonel in command of the 23rd Light Infantry Regiment in 1803 and led the unit at Caldiero, Campo Tenese, Maida, and Amantea. Promoted to general of brigade in 1807, he led a brigade in 1809, fighting at Sacile, Caldiero, the Piave, Tarvis, Raab, and Wagram.

== Recognitions ==
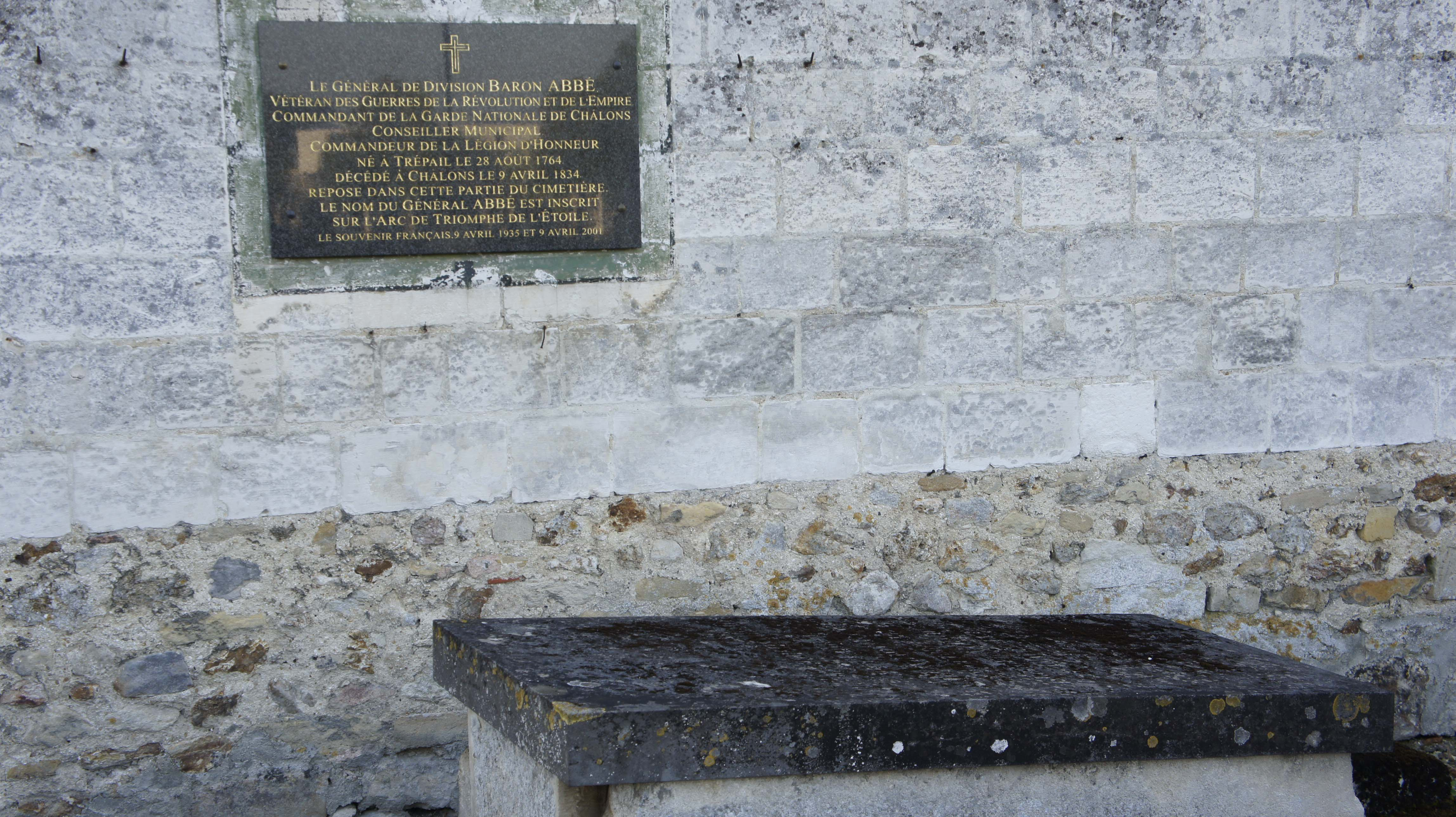
The tomb of General Abbé

Starting in 1810, Abbé served in the Peninsular War in Spain. He fought under Marshal Louis Gabriel Suchet at Falset, Tortosa, Tarragona, and Montserrat. He was promoted to general of division in 1811. He led a division under Marshal Nicolas Soult at the Pyrenees, San Marcial, the Bidassoa, Nivelle, the Nive, and Bayonne. He joined Napoleon in 1815 and fought the Austrians before being retired from the army in 1816. He was reactivated from 1830 to 1832 when he retired again. He died in 1834. ABBE is one of the names inscribed under the Arc de Triomphe, on Column 36.
