= George Allan Madden =

English major-general in the British and Portuguese services

- Born: 3 January 1771; London, England
- Died: 8 December 1828 (aged 57); Portsmouth, England
- Occupations: Army officer in the British and Portuguese services

Sir George Allan Madden CB (3 January 1771 – 8 December 1828) was an English army officer in the British and Portuguese services.

== Biography ==
Madden was the eighth son and fifteenth and youngest child of James Madden, of Cole Hill House, Fulham, Middlesex. He was born in London 3 January 1771, and was baptised at St. Martin's-in-the-Fields. After attending private schools, and accepting an engagement on trial in a merchant's office from September 1787, his father, in February 1788, obtained for him a commission in the army. He was appointed cornet in the 14th light dragoons in Ireland, 14 March 1789. On 30 June 1791 he purchased (from Arthur Wellesley, afterwards Duke of Wellington, then promoted in the 58th foot) a lieutenancy in the 12th or Prince of Wales's light dragoons, in which regiment he became captain 29 June 1793 and major 25 December 1800. After serving several years in Ireland, he embarked with his regiment at Cork in September 1793 for Ostend. Contrary winds drove them back, and the regiment was counter-ordered to Toulon, then just relieved by Admiral Hood. Adverse winds and defective supplies caused innumerable delays, and Toulon had been evacuated before the regiment arrived. Madden was with the mounted portion of the regiment, which was refused permission to land at Leghorn. At Porto Ferrajo, island of Elba, no forage could be found. At length, at the invitation of Pope Pius VI, it was put ashore at Civita Vecchia, 6 March 1794, the surviving horses, it is said (Services of Colonel G. A. Madden, p. 3), having then been nine months ashipboard. During the stay of the troops at Civita Vecchia gold medals were presented by the pope to the officers. It appears from the exergue that the medals were originally struck to commemorate the restoration of the port; but a subsequent order of the general commanding directed them to be constantly worn by the recipients, out of respect to the memory of the ill-fated pontiff. Pictures of the reception of the officers at Rome by Pius VI were placed at South Kensington, and in the officers mess 12th lancers. The regiment left Civita Vecchia in May 1794; took part in the operations in Corsica ending with the fall of Calvi in August, and was ordered home in November the same year. Madden's troop was shipwrecked on the coast of Spain. The men and horses were saved, and were assigned quarters by the Spanish government in one of the Puntales forts, near Cadiz, where they remained until a ship was sent out from England to fetch them home in August 1795 (ib. p. 4).

Madden's conduct was warmly approved by the British authorities at Gibraltar. In January 1797 he went with his regiment to Portugal, and was stationed three years at Lisbon. In 1801 the regiment accompanied Sir Ralph Abercromby to Egypt, and took part in the battle before Alexandria and the advance on Cairo. During the latter, Madden, the youngest field officer of cavalry present with the army, was sent by Lord Hutchinson with detachments of the 12th and 26th (afterwards 23rd) light dragoons, on special service towards Rosetta. Throughout the march on Cairo Madden's activity and intelligence won Hutchinson's high approbation.

There was much want of harmony between Madden and the officer in temporary command of the regiment, Colonel Browne, afterwards General Browne-Clayton, K.C. (see Gent. Mag. 1845, ii. 197). An angry altercation on duty matters had taken place between them (see Trial of G. A. Madden, London, 1803, pp. 37–8), and in August 1801 Madden charged Browne with having committed perjury in a recent court-martial on a captain of the 12th dragoons. In consequence Madden was arraigned before a general court-martial on a charge of unofficerlike conduct and disrespect to his commanding officer. The court-martial, of which Major-general (Sir) John Moore was president, and Colonels John Stuart (of Maida), Alan Cameron of Lochiel, and other famous officers were members, was held in the camp before Alexandria, 31 August 1801. Two editions of the proceedings were printed. The court found Madden guilty of the charge, and adjudged him to be dismissed the service. Lord Hutchinson refused to confirm the proceedings. Eventually, Madden, who was very popular with his brother-officers, was sent home, and permitted to retire by the sale of his commissions (Lond. Gaz. 26 May 1802), all of which he had purchased. When the 12th light dragoons arrived in England three years later, a duel took place between Madden and Blunden, a major of the regiment, who had taken a part against Madden in the quarrel. Madden, after receiving his adversary's shot, fired in the air, and the matter ended.

Madden was on terms of the closest intimacy with the margrave and margravine of Anspac, and lived with the family at Benham, Berkshire, and Brandenburgh House, Hammersmith, during the greater part of 1804–5. On 4 July 1805 he was, at the margrave's instance, appointed inspecting field-officer of yeomanry cavalry and volunteers in the midland district, with the temporary rank of lieutenant-colonel. On 17 May 1807 his appointment was renewed in the Severn district. He held the post until June 1809, when he was appointed a brigadier-general in the Portuguese army, with pay and allowances as in the British service

On 10 September 1809 Marshal Beresford gave Madden a Portuguese cavalry brigade. Five months later Lord Wellington inspected the brigade, and expressed the highest approval of its discipline and good order, to which it had been brought in the face of difficulties of every kind. In August 1810 Madden's brigade was sent into Spain, to be attached to the Spanish army of Estramadura, commanded by the Marquis de la Romana. Wellington, who thought highly of Madden, recommended him to Romana as ‘un officier Anglais de beaucoup de talent’ (Gurwood, v. 220). Madden's brigade remained with the Spaniards, under Romana and his successor, Mendizabel, throughout the French siege of Badajoz until its surrender to the French in March 1811 (see Napier, revised ed. vols. iii. iv.) At Fuente de Cantos, 15 September 1810, he saved the Spanish army—which, hard pressed by the French, was retreating in disorder, and like to disperse in flight—by most gallantly charging with his brigade a superior force of French hussars (ib. iii. 17). At Gebora, on the San Engracio heights, on 19 February 1811, when the Spanish army was routed, and Madden's Portuguese, following the dastardly example of the Spaniards, ran away (ib. iii. 97–8), he was allowed on all sides to have done all that man could do. His brigade was with Beresford's army before Badajoz, but a small portion only were engaged at Albuera, the rest being on detached duty with Madden, who was unaware of the likelihood of a battle; it was subsequently with the allied cavalry under General William Lumley, and with Wellington's army until the latter raised the second siege of Badajoz and retired behind the Caya. During the latter part of these operations Madden's command was augmented by two more regiments, raising the Portuguese cavalry under him to the strength of a division. When Wellington's army went into cantonments for the winter, the Portuguese cavalry was sent to Oporto, where it remained during the rest of the year. Early in 1812 it was ordered to Golegao, near Lisbon. The difficulty of procuring remounts decided Beresford to reduce the number of regiments, and to give up the idea of employing the Portuguese cavalry in brigades for a time. Madden thus found his occupation gone, and returned home in the early summer of 1812. In the meantime he had been reinstated in his rank in the British service, ‘at the special request of the Prince Regent and the government of Portugal, in recompense for his services in the army of that country’ (Lond. Gaz. 3 March 1812). In the ‘Annual Army List’ of 1813 his name reappears as lieutenant-colonel, late 12th dragoons, with seniority from 4 July 1805.

Madden went back to Portugal in August 1812, and was appointed to command the 7th brigade of Portuguese infantry, which passed the winter of 1812–13 in villages about the Estrella mountains, and by arduous forced marches joined Wellington at Vittoria the morning after the great victory of 21 June 1813. Madden commanded the brigade, which was attached to the sixth British division, in the operations in the Pyrenees during the blockade of Pampeluna, including the affairs at St. Estevan and Sauroren. He attained the rank of marechal de campo, or major-general, in the Portuguese service, on 4 June 1813, but to avoid difficulties as to precedence, the promotion appears not to have been announced until after the arrival from home of the 4 June birthday ‘Gazette,’ by which he was promoted colonel in the British army. Notwithstanding the high character of his services with the Portuguese army—he had been third in seniority among the English officers, and had commanded a cavalry division—the precedence given by his Portuguese rank was regarded as unfair to the English colonels of equal standing, and he was directed to resign his brigade to the next senior officer, Sir John Douglas. After witnessing the assault on San Sebastian as a spectator, he repaired to Lisbon to await orders, and remained unemployed until the peace, when he returned home. He became a major-general in the British army 12 August 1819.

Madden was made C.B. 4 June 1815, a knight commander of the Tower and Sword in Portugal 19 December 1815, and a knight bachelor 5 July 1816. He had, besides the papal medal, the Turkish order of the Crescent, the general officers' gold medal for the Pyrenees, and the Portuguese ‘Guerra Peninsular’ cross, decreed 1 July 1816, and given some years later to all officers effective in the six campaigns 1809–16 (see Naval and Mil. Gaz. 27 April 1844, p. 261). Madden died unmarried, on 8 December 1828, at the age of fifty-seven, at Portsmouth, at the house of his brother, Captain William John Madden, half-pay royal marines, who was father of Sir Frederic Madden. He was buried with military honours in Portsmouth Royal Garrison Church, where a tablet was placed in his memory.

Madden's portrait was painted in 1817 by Miss Geddes, afterwards Mrs. Margaret Sarah Carpenter, and copied in oils by Samuel Cousins, R.A.
