= Juan Díaz Porlier =

Spanish soldier

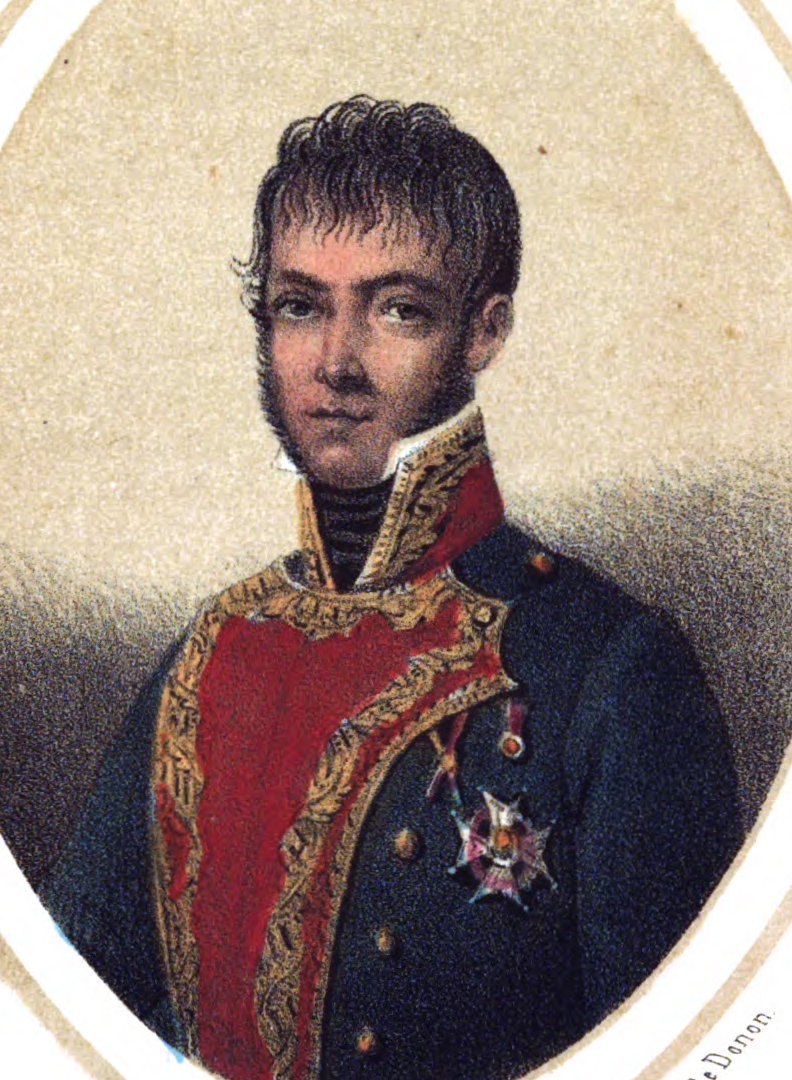
- Portrait of Juan Díaz Porlier. Lithography by J. Donón, in Los mártires de la libertad española, by V. Ameller (1853)
- Born: 1788; Cartagena de Indias, Colombia
- Died: 3 October 1815 (aged 26–27) La Coruña, Spain

Juan Díaz Porlier (1788 – 1815), also known as the "Marquesito" (Note: Although Oman (Oman, 1908: p. 485.) ascribes this to Porlier being nephew to the Marquis of La Romana, both Walton (Walton, 1837: p. 216.) and the online biography at Real Academia de la Historia point to the likelihood that his uncle was the Marquis of Bajamar.) ("the Little Marquis"), was a Spanish military commander active during the Peninsular War.

== Early career ==
In February 1802, Porlier joined the crew as a naval cadet of the 80-gun ship of the line Neptuno at La Habana. Reaching Cádiz the following May, he enrolled at the recently founded Academia de Pilotos e Intendentes de la Real Armada at San Fernando. In April 1805, as a midshipman, he sailed on the Argonauta, flagship (and sister ship of the Neptuno) of the Commander-in-Chief of the Spanish Navy, Gravina, as part of the squadron headed for Martinique.

On their return to Spanish waters, the squadron defeated Admiral Calder's squadron at Finisterre. Back at Cadiz, Porlier boarded Gravina's flagship Principe de Asturias and fought at Trafalgar. Following that battle, Porlier requested to be transferred to an army regiment and, as a navy lieutenant, he became a captain of the 2nd Company of the Infantry Regiment of Mallorca, a Marine unit.

== Peninsular War (1807–1814) ==
In October 1808, as a lieutenant colonel, Porlier commanded the 1st Regiment of Provincial Grenadiers, belonging to General Galluzo's Army of Extremadura. However, shortly thereafter, Galluzo was replaced by Conde de Belvedere.

=== Battle of Gamonal (10 November 1808) ===
At the Gamonal, Belvedere's troops suffered an overwhelming defeat by Soult's troops, the men of Porlier's regiment were the only troops that managed to withstand the onslaught and hold their line, along with those of Colonel Vicente Genaro de Quesada's 4th Battalion of the Walloon Guard, and retreat in order.

=== Guerrilla warfare ===
The defeat at Gamonal and Blake's defeat at Espinosa de los Monteros, led to the dispersion of some 20,000 regular troops throughout Cantabria, Castilla-León, Navarra, País Vasco and Rioja, many of whom would form guerrilla bands to fight against the French. (Note: This was, specifically, the case of Porlier who, with his regular troops, would be active in the north of the country and whose division of 6,450 troops, made up of five infantry regiments and one of hussars, would, by early 1811, form the vanguard of the 33,230-strong 7th Army, which brought together five divisions of guerillas (Díaz Porlier's Cantabrian Division, Longa's Iberian Division, Renovales's Basque Division, Espoz y Mina's Navarran Division and Merino's Castilian Division. (Puell.))

Following their rout at Gamonal, Porlier's regiment headed north towards Santander, hoping to join Blake's Army of Galicia. However, on learning the following day that Soult had defeated Blake at Espinosa de los Monteros they now found themselves in unknown territory and separated from other Spanish troops. They therefore decided to head for Palencia, birthplace of his sergeant, Bartolomé Amor Pisa.

At the beginning of 1809, Porlier's men were involved in several minor actions in the province of Palencia. On 10 March, they attacked the French battalion garrisoned at Aguilar de Campóo, capturing nine officers, 400 soldiers and two 4-pounder guns, which were taken to Oviedo and handed over to the Junta del Principado.

As a result of this action, Porlier was promoted to brigadier and his second-in-command, Amor, to captain.

The following May, General Mahy, interim chief of the 6th Army Corps, decided to incorporate Porlier's troops, which had now increased in number, as a division of the Army of Asturias. This army, also comprising Blake's and La Romana's divisions, was commanded by La Romana.

The new division, named División Franca o Volante de Cantabria (Free or Flying Division of Cantabria), comprised three Infantry regiments—those of Cantabria, Laredo and Castilla—, as well as the Cantabrian Battalion of Riflemen and the Hussar Regiment of Cantabria.

In February 1811, the Regency acknowledged his rank as Infantry brigadier and appointed him commander-in-chief of the Vanguard of the 7th Army, as well as officially acknowledging his division.

=== Battle of San Marcial (31 August 1813) ===
For his actions at the San Marcial, Porlier, commanding the 5th Division of the 4th Army, was promoted to field marshal. Crossing over into France, his troops saw action there until the beginning of December, when they returned to Spain and Porlier's division was garrisoned at Bilbao for the rest of the war.

== See also ==
- Guerrilla warfare in the Peninsular War
