= Manuel Pinto de Morais Bacelar, 1st Viscount of Monte Alegre =

Manuel Pinto de Morais Bacelar
- Born: 4 September 1741; Kingdom of Portugal
- Died: 1 May 1816 (aged 74); Viseu, Kingdom of Portugal
- Military career
- Allegiance: Portugal
- Service years: 1756–1816
- Rank: Lieutenant-General
- Conflicts: Spanish invasion of Portugal (1762); War of the Oranges; Peninsular War

Dom Manuel Pinto de Morais Bacelar 1st Count of Monte Alegre, was a Portuguese general.

== Early career ==
He was the son of the auxiliary infantry field master of the Bragança garrison, Lazarus Pinto de Morais Bacelar, and a descendant of the former masters of the Bacelar Tower. In 1756 he enlisted in the Cavalry Regiment of Chaves, and at the time of the War of 1762 raised at his expense a cavalry company, for which he obtained by decree of 19 June the rank of captain. With the regiment took he part in the military operations marching to the province of Minho, which was then threatened by the sides of Valencia, and later, at the proposal of Brigadier Smith. who commanded the corps, proceeded to act interimly as major. Promoted to the effectiveness of this post in July 1782, he rose to lieutenant-colonel in March 1789, and finally to colonel in November 1796 with the command of the regiment in which he had always served. In the failed enterprise that during the war of 1801 Field Marshal Gomes Freire de Andrade undertook with the troops of the command of Lieutenant-General D. Manuel José Lobo against Monte Rei he covered Manuel Pinto Bacelar with great bravery and arranged the withdrawal of our troops contributing powerfully to save the forces engaged in that commission, and to maintain the credit and honor of our weapons. When the war was over, he was promoted to brigadier, always at the head of the regiment, until it was re-melted with the denomination of 6th Cavalry Regiment.

== Peninsular War ==
Although removed from active service, when in 1807 he planned to resist the French invasion, Brigadier Bacelar offered to obey the orders of Lieutenant General Sepúlveda, accepting the command of a planned line of defense of the northern provinces that the government had ordered. However, all these preparations for the fight were ordered to be suspended, and Napoleon's troops were able to enter Portugal without finding anyone to take their step. Returning to the house of Vilar de Ossos there, he was retired until, summoned by the patriotic voice of Sepulveda in June 1808, he was appointed acting interim commander of the Douro district troops, an appointment confirmed by the government board established in Porto. In the performance of these duties he patented all the skill and energy he was endowed with, actively taking care of reorganizing the provincial troops, especially the cavalry, until, when the revolution against the French was broken in Viseu, he was the Brigadier in charge of the interim government. Beira province's weapons for the need to put in this post, according to the ordinance that appointed him, a trusted general officer. Having determined the total reorganization of the army on 22 July, and were then ordered to constitute an operations corps in Extremadura, another of observations in Beira and Trás-os-Montes, and also a reserve in Coimbra, Bacelar was given the command of the second with which he marched from the vicinity of the Guard towards Castelo Branco regulating its movements by those of the operations army (that obeyed Bernardim Freire de Andrade) in combination with those of the English army of Wellesley. Continuing the march, he made important raids on the enemy at Constância and Santarém, and then went to Santo António do Tojal to join the army of operations stationed at Mafra. After being summoned to Lisbon with the other generals to report to the government, he was promoted to field marshal, and shortly thereafter sent to Porto to assist General Bernardim Freire in the important commissions he was assigned. At the end of 1808 he was mandated to take command of the observation body for the provinces of Beira and Trás-os-Montes, with which he marched to the city of Guarda and went to occupy the positions between that city and that of Castelo Branco, from where he succeeded. to circumvent the attempts of French general Lapisse, who sought to enter Beira Baixa, while Soult invaded Portugal from the north. In the operations of Wellington to recover the city of Porto, Bacelar was in charge of several movements in the right of the Anglo-Portuguese army, and having, according to the instructions he had received, passed the Douro in Régua, directed himself over Mesão Frio, and was sent from there. march to Chaves, through the Serra do Marão by Mondim de Basto and Pernalves.

After the French were expelled, General Bacelar returned to his command of Beira, and having been promoted to lieutenant general, in Viseu he remained until, in June 1810, being given the superior command of the corps of the Militias of the three northern provinces and Porto party, went to establish their headquarters in Lamego. In this situation he carefully took care of organizing the auxiliary troops of the provincial army, and when Massena invaded the Portuguese territory, Bacelar long kept the northern provinces of the kingdom free from enemies, and then operating against Drouet over the Alva and Claperéde, which had occupied Lamego, finally succeeded, when the imperial troops withdrew, to limit their left flank to Mondego and to preserve the peoples on the right bank of that river from the horrors and catastrophes that accompanied the passing of the French soldiers. The services he then performed and our general received a letter of praise from Marshal Wellington, which was published in the Order of the Day, and later the title of Viscount Monte Alegre, which the sovereign gave him on 17 December. In the following year, he took part in military operations, when Marmont and Brenier devastated some of our lands near the border, and thereafter continued quietly in charge of him until he died in Viseu.

== Personal life ==
On 16 July 1776 Bacelar married D. Joana Delfina Vanzeler Teixeira de Andrade Pinto, daughter of Pedro Francisco Vanzeler, colonel of dragons and governor of S. Noutel Fort in Chaves, and his wife, D. Maria Josefa Barbosa Silva Silva Teixeira Andrade Pinto.

== Promotions and Units ==
Rank	Unit	Date
Commander	Militias of Beira, Trás-os-Montes and Douro	June 1810
Lieutenant General		15 September 1809
Governor of Arms	Beira	2 January 1809
Field Marshal		20 September 1808
Commander	Army of Operations of Beira and Trás-os-Montes	22 July 1808
Commander	Corps of Operations of Beira and Trás-os-Montes	November 1807
Discharged from Service		4 November 1803
Brigadier	Cavalry Regiment of Bragança	14 November 1802
Colonel	Cavalry Regiment of Bragança	26 November 1796
Lieutenant Colonel	Cavalry Regiment of Bragança	23 March 1789
Major	Cavalry Regiment of Bragança	23 July 1782
Captain	Cavalry Regiment of Bragança	
Captain	Cavalry Regiment of Chaves	19 June 1762
Volunteer	Cavalry Regiment of Chaves	1756

== Sources ==
- (in Portuguese) http://www.arqnet.pt/exercito/bacelar.html
- (in Portuguese) http://www.arqnet.pt/dicionario/montealegre1v.html
