= François Franceschi-Losio =

Italo-French general

François Franceschi-Losio (French pronunciation: [fʁɑ̃swa fʁɑ̃tʃɛski lozjo]; 3 July 1770 – 1810) was an Italo-French general, who entered the French Revolutionary army in 1795.

Born in Milan, he served through the Italian campaign of 1796–97, and subsequently, like Franceschi-Delonne, with Masséna at Zurich and at Genoa, and at the headquarters of King Joseph Bonaparte in Italy and Spain. He was killed in a duel by Carlo Filangieri in 1810.
