= Edmé-Martin Vandermaesen =

French Army officer

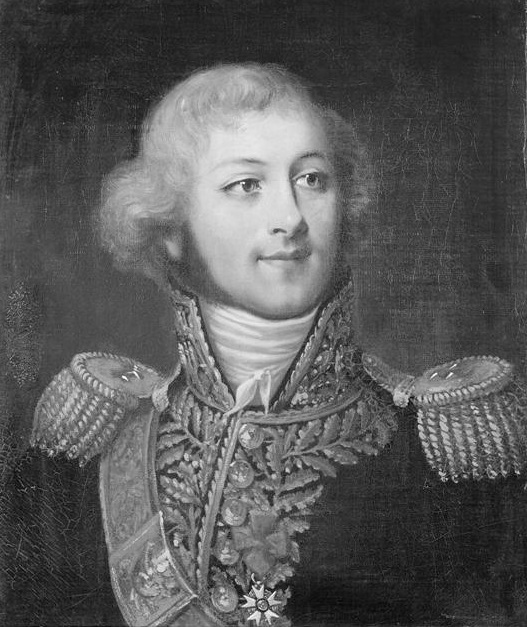
Portrait of Vandermaesen

Edmé-Martin, comte Vandermaesen (11 November 1767 – 1 September 1813) was a French Army officer who served in the French Revolutionary Wars and the Napoleonic Wars. He was killed in action while leading his troops to safety after the Battle of San Marcial in the Peninsular War.

== French Revolution ==
Vandermaesen joined the French Royal Army's Touraine Regiment as an enlisted man in 1782, rising to lieutenant in 1792. He was employed as an instructor for the Jura battalion, then put in charge of the logistics, and eventually took command of the Jura battalion after a promotion to adjudant-major. He took part in the Second Battle of Wissembourg and in engagements in Haguenau, Vandenheim and Landau. General Claude Ignace François Michaud gave him command of the grenadiers of the division and sent him to capture the town of Brumpt, where a violent engagement occurred; Vandermaesen was wounded by a gunshot in the leg.

In early 1794, he was promoted to chef de brigade, taking command of the 14th demi-brigade. He took part in fights at Mannheim, and led the crossing of the Rhine at Spire. Vandermaesen's and Decaen's units captured Frankenthal. The 14th demi-brigade was renamed 62nd demi-brigade, and took part in the battles of Offenburg, Rincken, Rastadt, Masch, Nerescheim, Geisenfeld, Neuboarg, Lesenfeld, and Biberach. Besieged in Kehl with the French Army, Vandermaesen conducted a number of sorties; under orders from Decaen, he retook advanced positions captured by the Austrians.

The French Army crossed the Rhine again but was soon recalled after peace talks occurred in Leoben. At this time, Vandermaesen relinquished the command of the 62nd demi-brigade and took that of the 53rd, in the vanguard of the Army of Danube. At Ostrach, he was sent on a reconnaissance, taking a hundred prisoners; the next day, superior forces threatening to cut him from the French main corps, he was forced to retreat. Vandermaesen forced his way back to the main body of the French troops, and was again shot in the leg. He was mentioned in the report of Jean-Baptiste Jourdan about the affair, earning the rank of general of brigade.

After another crossing the Rhine under fire, Vandermaesen captured Brisach, and made a junction with the Army of Switzerland. He took part in engagements against Swiss insurgents before being sent back to the Rhine Army, under general Laroche. He among the last French units on the right bank of the Rhine, while defending Mannheim and Neckarau. Vandermaesen was put in charge of the defence of Neckarau, with 6,000 men. On the 2nd complementary day of An VII (18 September 1799), Prince Charles' 30,000 men stormed the town. In a 6-hour fight, Vandermaesen retreated in good order towards Mannheim. The city itself fell soon afterwards, however. Vandermaesen's retreat was cut off and he was taken prisoner. Vandermaesen was exchanged on 5 January 1801 for General-Major Meczery, and returned to the Army in Salzburg.

== Napoleonic Empire ==
After the Treaty of Amiens, Decaen was made captain general of Eastern colonies, and Vandermaesen was chosen to second him. He embarked at Brest on 15 ventôse an XI (6 March 1803), bound for Pondicherry, but with another war with Britain breaking out, the French division diverted to Isle de France. Vandermaesen was put in charge of the division, and was promoted in the Legion of Honour on 5 germinal an XII (26 March 1804); as second to the governor of Mauritius, he commanded the troops garrisoned there and in Isle Bourbon. After the French surrender following the British invasion of Isle de France, Vandermaesen returned to France, where he was received by Napoleon, and given command of a division under General of Division Caffarelli.

Vandermaesen served in Spain from March 1812, along with Bertrand Clausel, in charge of the Army of Northern Spain. With 4,000 men and 500 horses, Vandermaesen battled Mina's guerillas, capturing his two artillery pieces.

== Death ==
Shortly after being made a count of Empire, Vandermaesen's 5th Division fought in the Battle of San Marcial. In command of 10,000 men of the rearguard, he found that the Bidassoa River had risen too high for his soldiers to cross at the fords. The only bridge in the area was guarded by a company of British riflemen defending loopholed buildings while the gunpowder of the French was soaked by a heavy rain. While supervising the storming of the bridge at Vera in the early hours of September 1, 1813, Vandermaesen was killed by a gunshot in the side. Though the French suffered heavy casualties, the rest of the column escaped the trap due largely to a British error. His son was granted the title of baron in 1814.

== Sources ==
- Glover, Michael. The Peninsular War 1807–1814. London: Penguin, 2001. ISBN 0-14-139041-7
- Biographie des hommes remarquables du département de Seine-et-Oise, depuis le commencement de la Monarchie jusqu'à ce jour, M & H Daniel, 1832
