= Guillaume François d'Aigremont =

Guillaume François, baron d'Aigremont (1 April 1770 – 7 January 1827) was a French general de brigade (brigadier general).

He born in Paris. He fought at the Battle of Marengo in 1800 and the Battle of Maria in Spain during the Peninsular War. He was made a baron during the First French Empire by Napoleon Bonaparte. He was an officer of the Legion of Honour and a knight of the Order of Saint Louis.

== Bibliography ==
- Mullié, Charles (1852), "Daigremont, ou plutôt d'Aigremont (Guillaume-François)" , Biographie des célébrités militaires des armées de terre et de mer de 1789 à 1850 (in French), Paris: Poignavant et Compagnie, pp. 339–340
