= Manuel Freire de Andrade =

Spanish cavalry officer and general officer

- Born: November 4, 1767; Carmona, Spain
- Died: March 7, 1835 (aged 67)
- Spouse: Beatriz Abbad y Alfaro
- Children: 2
- Relatives: Francisco Freire de Andrade and Josefa Armijo y Bravo
- Military career
- Allegiance: Spanish
- Branch: Cavalry
- Rank: General
- Commands: Cavalry
- Conflicts: Peninsular War; • Battle of Talavera; • Battle of Ocaña; • Battle of San Marcial; • Battle of the Bidassoa; • Battle of Nivelle; • Battle of Toulouse
- Awards: San Fernando Cross

Manuel Alberto Freire de Andrade y Armijo (4 November 1767 – 7 March 1835) was a Spanish cavalry officer and general officer during the Peninsular War, and later Defense Minister.

== Early biography ==
Freire (also known as Freyre) was born in Carmona, Spain near Seville, to a Spanish cavalry officer from Galicia, Francisco Freire de Andrade, and his wife Josefa Armijo y Bravo, also from Carmona. He joined his father's Alcántara cavalry regiment as a minor cadet when just seven years old, and on 1 January 1780 became an ordinary cadet. He participated in his first battle on 15 May 1793, against revolutionary French forces during the opening of the Battle of Mas Deu, part of the War of the Pyrenees. Freire spent the next two years in Rousillon and Catalonia, including that war's last actions during which Spanish forces recaptured Puigcerda and Bellver (after the peace treaty had been signed). Freire received several promotions during that war, having been named a junior lieutenant on 10 October 1793, full lieutenant on 20 November, ayundante on 13 December 1793, captain on 18 February 1794, and cavalry captain on 28 July 1795. During the following peace, Freire was promoted to sergeant major, then command of a squadron on 4 April 1801. He later participated in a campaign against Portugal in Arronches, before being assigned to training in Mallorca.

== Peninsular War ==
Freire joined fellow Spaniards in fighting against invading Napoleonic forces, and on 15 September 1807, took command (as colonel) of a volunteer cavalry regiment in Madrid. The following year he saw action in Extremadura and other locations. He was promoted to brigadier on 2 March 1809 after a campaign in La Mancha, and to field marshal after the Battle of Talavera. On 10 January 1810, he was appointed commander of cavalry under Juan Carlos de Aréizaga and led them at Ocaña on 19 November, a devastating defeat that cost the Spanish control of Andalusia. He wrote a manual revising Spanish cavalry tactics, published in Murcia in 1813.

After fighting the French in Murcia, Granada, and Valencia (1810–1812), Freire became a general and succeeded Francisco Javier Castaños in command of the Fourth Army, or Army of Galicia on August 12, 1813. His corps defeated Soult at the Battle of San Marcial on 31 August 1813, earning him the San Fernando Cross. At the Battle of the Bidassoa on 7 October, Freire led the divisions of Generals Del Barco and Barcena across the river to capture French positions on Mont Calvaire. Freire also participated in the Battle of Nivelle on 10 November. He fought with "conspicuous gallantry" at the Battle of Toulouse in 1814, where his two divisions were desperately mauled in the fighting for the French redoubts on Mont Rave; the situation was finally resolved when the power of the British Congreve rockets, reinforced by a French tactical blunder and by British infantry support, intervened.

On 7 October 1814, Freire married Beatriz Abbad y Alfaro, the 33-year-old widow of a fellow officer. They had two sons, Manuel (who died shortly after his father) and Jose (who succeeded to the title of Marquis de San Marcial awarded his father shortly before his death).

Freire's military career continued, and he also became active in politics during the turbulent post-war era. In 1818, Freire and three other officers published "Informe sobre la mejora y aumento de la cría de caballos, dado al Supremo Consejo de Guerra". Two years later, he published two additional books concerning his postwar conduct in Andalucia and Cadiz.
