= Francisco de Longa =

Spanish military commander (1783–1831)

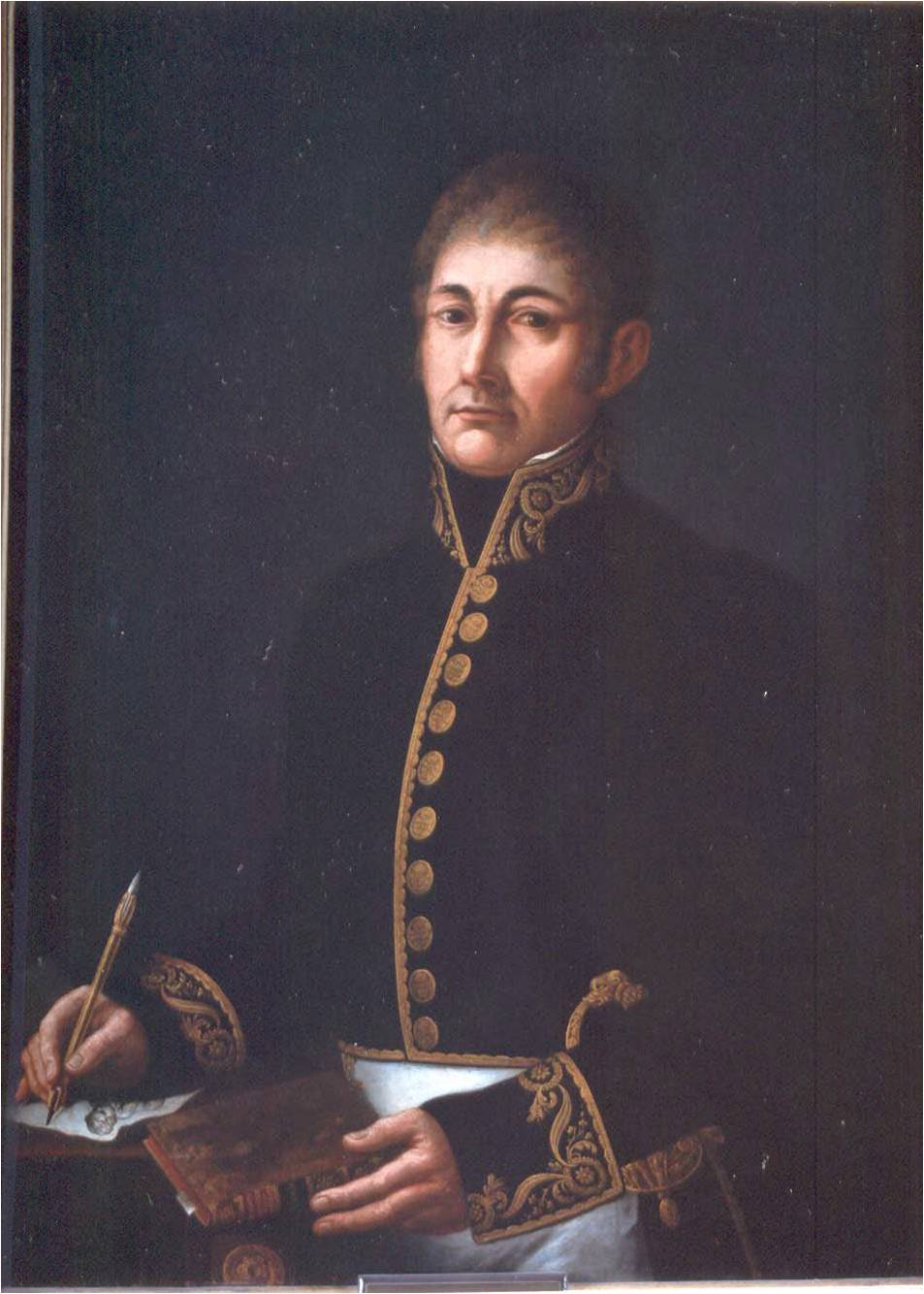
- Portrait of Francisco de Longa by Miguel Parra Abril, c. 1827–1828 (Museum of Fine Arts of Valencia)
- Born: 10 April 1783; Bolívar, Vizcaya, Spain
- Died: 21 December 1831 (aged 48) Valencia
- Rank: Lieutenant general
- Conflicts: Peninsular War; Battle of Vitoria; Battle of the Bidassoa; Battle of the Pyrenees; Battle of San Marcial

Francisco Tomás de Anchia y Urquiza (1783–1831) was a Spanish military commander. Better known as Francisco de Longa, (Note: The confusion regarding the name Longa, which he himself used, is due to the fact that Longa was the name of the caserio (farmhouse) at which he was born. As for the discrepancies regarding his place of birth, Longa is in the municipality of Bolívar and, although he was baptised at the parish church of Bolívar, Mallavia appears on his birth certificate as the place of residence of his parents, as well as his place of birth on his marriage certificate. (Cassinello Pérez.)) he first saw action during the Peninsular War as a guerrilla leader, eventually becoming incorporated into the regular army, promoted to lieutenant general and being appointed captain general of Old Castile (1825) and captain general of Valencia and Murcia (1827).

== Peninsular War ==
Although nothing is known of his early life, at the outbreak of the war, he had recently married and was running a prosperous business in La Puebla de Arganzón (Burgos), employing 26 "servants" to whom, in August 1809, he offered 100 billon reales for each Frenchman they killed and for each firearm they captured. Shortly thereafter he was able to arm twelve of his men, and now offering 4,000 reales for each mail captured, they started intercepting the French Army's lines of communications.

With the French authorities looking for him, he was forced to flee to La Rioja, where he joined, briefly, the guerrilla bands of Friar Constantino and Francisco Fernández de Castro, Marquis of Barrio Lucio. Returning to his region, on 25 December 1809 he attacked a detachment of forty French troops at Nanclares.

In January 1811, in reward for his services, General Mahy, commander-in-chief of the Army of Galicia, incorporated Longa into the regular army by appointing him lieutenant colonel and giving him the command of a squadron. The following October he was promoted to commanding officer of the Iberia Division of Mendizábal's 7th Army, and in April 1812 he was promoted to colonel.

He saw action at Sangüesa (8 January 1813) and distinguished himself at Vitoria, being awarded an honorary sabre by the Allied commander-in-chief, Arthur Wellesley, 1st Marquess of Wellington, himself. He was also promoted to brigadier.

Serving under General Bárcena, Longa moved forward with the Allied forces towards the border with France, seeing action at the bridge of Yanci (29 July or 1 August) and at San Marcial (31 August). The following October, his division together with Charles, Count Alten's Light Division saw action at the pass of Vera de Bidasoa and, crossing into France, at Ascaín.

Longa was promoted to field marshal in 1814. Pedro Agustín Girón, who disliked Longa, claimed that the promotion had been purchased for 120,000 reales.

Longa's guerilla forces aided in depriving the French forces of intelligence and provided intelligence of French locations to Wellington. Longa also achieved disruption: French internal coordination and logistics were hampered, negatively affecting French discipline and morale. The major achievements of the Battle of Vitoria were a greater French casualty rate vs allied forces (approximately 8,000 to 5,000 respectively) and capture of 151 of 153 French cannons and 415 French caissons (ammunition chests). Some argue that without forces like Longa's guerillas, French forces would not have been defeated. Within the following month, most French forces left Spain and French rule was practically ended.

His detailed service records show three actions in 1809; twenty-three in 1810; nineteen in 1811; fourteen in 1812 and seventeen in 1813, with 2,195 French troops killed and 4,024 taken prisoner.

== Post-war career ==
In 1825 he was promoted to lieutenant general and appointed captain general of Old Castile. In 1827 he was appointed captain general of Valencia and Murcia.
