= José Worster =

Spanish army officer (1765–1819)

- Born: 25 November 1765; Barcelona, Catalonia, Spain
- Died: 26 April 1819 (aged 53) Toro, Zamora
- Conflicts: War of the Pyrenees; War of the Oranges; Peninsular War

José Worster Servent (1765–1819) was a Spanish lieutenant general and commander (colonel) of Artillery.

== Early career ==
Worster enlisted as a cadet at the Royal College of Artillery at Segovia in 1780. By the end of 1789, he had been promoted to lieutenant.

During the War of the Pyrenees, under the orders of Ventura Caro, he saw action at Irún and was promoted to captain in 1795.

During the War of the Oranges, he served in Galicia under the orders of the French general, Marquis de Saint-Simón.

In 1806 he was promoted to lieutenant coronel and appointed commander of artillery at Gijón.

== Peninsular War (1807–1814) ==
Shortly after the outbreak of the war, the Junta de Asturias promoted Worster to lieutenant general and at the beginning of 1809 he was given command of the 5th Division, responsible for defending the line of the river Eo, which forms the boundary between Galicia and Asturias, and liaising with the Army of Galicia. On 11 March he captured Mondoñedo, but was forced to retreat shortly afterwards by the French forces under General Maurice Mathieu.

In April 1809, Worster was stationed at Oviedo, where he commanded the regiments of Gijón and Infiesto, numbering some 2,000 troops. (Note: It was precisely that month that the Marquis de La Romana staged his mini-coup against the Junta of Asturias. Having successfully cut off the French in Galicia by taking Villafranca, and capturing captured the whole 600-strong battalion of the 6th Léger, La Romana had left General Mahy in command and swept down into Oviedo with his Princesa regiment, one of his old corps from the Division of the North. Accompanied by Colonel Joseph O'Donnell and fifty grenadiers of the Princesa regiment, he accused the Junta of "maladministration and provincial selfishness". He then nominated a new Junta. Although many of its members refused to cooperate, the Asturian authorities began to send stores, medicines, munitions, and clothing to La Romana's troops. As Oman put it: "La Romana might well be indignant that the Asturians had done practically nothing for the cause of Spain from December to March, especially since they had obtained more than their share of the British arms and money which had been distributed in the autumn of 1808." (Oman 1908: pp. 373-376.))

Marshal Ney captured Oviedo on 19 May, by which time Worster had withdrawn to Castropol. Marquis de La Romana, commander-in-chief of the Army of the Left, ordered him to march towards Oviedo, but when Worster heard that Marshal Ney was approaching Castropol, with vastly superior forces, the Spanish troops were able to escape up into the mountains.

When La Romana dismissed Worster from his command on 12 July, Worster went to Seville to appeal to the Junta Central. The Junta ordered him to return to Asturias, where he then joined the War Council of the Junta del Principado.

In July 1810, he was appointed commander of Artillery at Ferrol, where he remained until August 1811, when he was attached to the 5th Army.

In November 1811 he was promoted to Artillery colonel, and when Ciudad Rodrigo was recovered, in January 1812, Worster was appointed commander of Artillery there.

After Worster had complained directly to Wellington (4 September 1812), the governor, Francisco Dionisio Vives, and the second-in-command of Old Castille, Carlos de España, both accused him of insubordination, for which he was arrested and relieved of his command. On 1 October 1814, the secretary for War published the decree in which Ferdinand VII fully absolved him and he was reinstated in his post at Ciudad Rodrigo.

== Post-war career ==
In December 1815, Worster was appointed commander of Artillery at Vigo, post he held until October the following year, when he was transferred to the barracks at Toro.

In 1818, he was awarded the Grand Cross of the Royal and Military Order of Saint Hermenegild.
