= Battle of the Bidassoa =

1813 battle of the campaign in south-west France

- Part of the campaign in south-west France
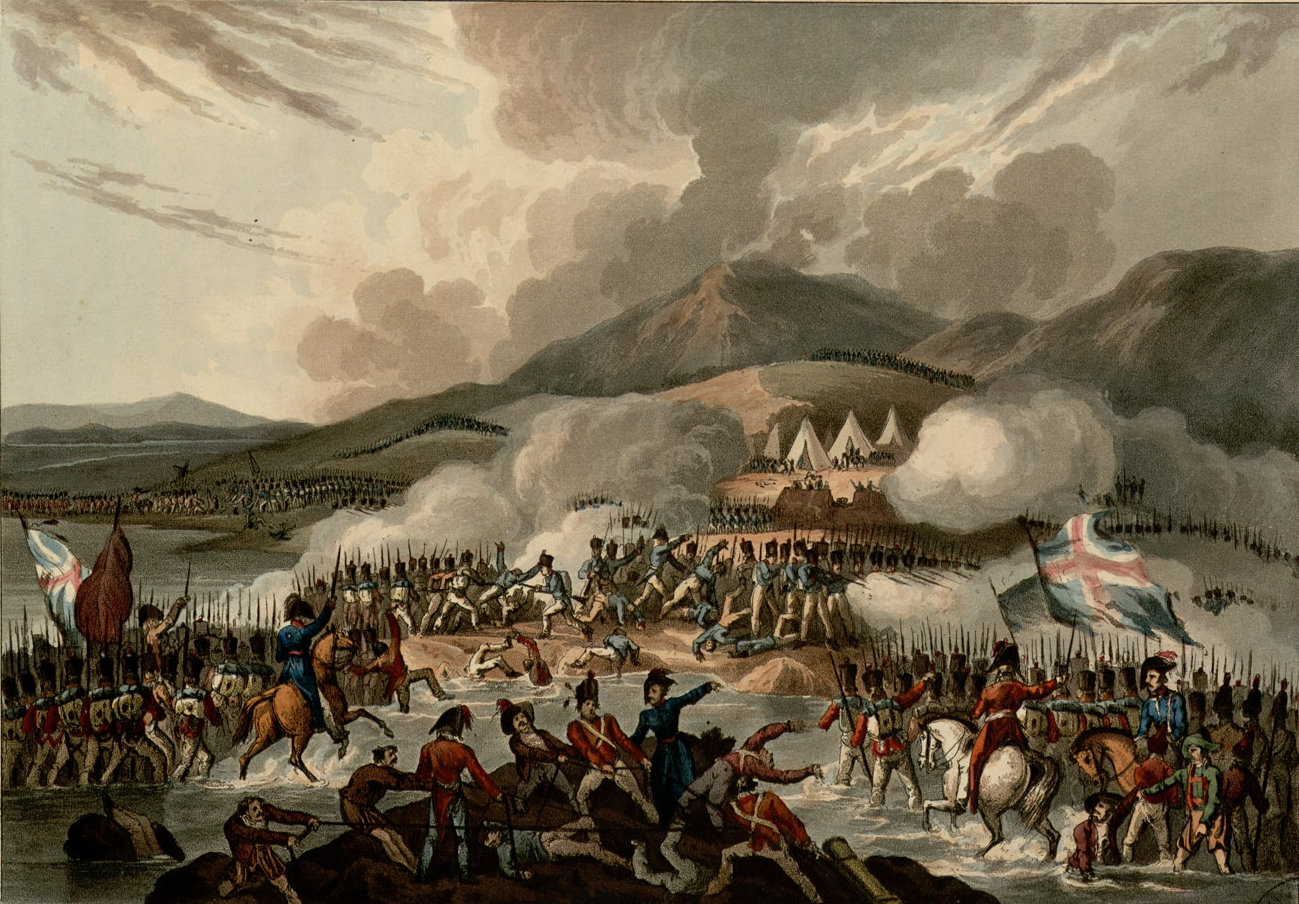
- 1814–1815 engraving of the battle
Date	7 October 1813
Location	Near Hendaye, Basses-Pyrénées 43°20′16″N 1°43′7″W
Result	Coalition victory

Belligerents
United Kingdom; Portugal; Spain	France

Commanders and leaders
(United Kingdom of Great Britain and Ireland) Marquess of Wellington	(First French Empire) Jean-de-Dieu Soult

Strength
89,000	62,000

Casualties and losses
825–1,600 killed, wounded or missing	990 killed or wounded 658 captured 17 cannons
- Location within Europe

Peninsular War:
Campaign in south-west France
current battle

The Battle of the Bidasoa (also known the Battle of Larrun) was fought on 7 October 1813. The Allied army of Arthur Wellesley, Marquess of Wellington wrested a foothold on French soil from General Jean-de-Dieu Soult's army. The Allied troops overran the French lines behind the Bidassoa River on the coast and along the Pyrenees crest between the Bidasoa and La Rhune (Larrun). The nearest towns to the fighting are Irun on the lower Bidassoa and Bera on the middle Bidasoa. The battle occurred during the Peninsular War, part of the wider Napoleonic Wars.

Wellington aimed his main assault at the lower Bidasoa, while sending additional troops to attack Soult's centre. Believing his coastal sector secure, Soult held the right flank with a relatively weak force while concentrating most of his strength on his left flank in the mountains. However, the British general obtained local intelligence that indicated that water levels on the lower river were much lower than the French suspected. After careful planning, Wellington launched a surprise assault which easily overran the French left flank defences. In the centre, his army also won through the French defenses, though his Spanish allies were repulsed in one attack. At the beginning of the fighting, Soult realised that his left flank was in no danger, but it was too late to reinforce his positions on the right. Some French generals were shocked at how poorly their soldiers fought.

== Background ==
=== Operations ===
In the Battle of San Marcial on 31 August and 1 September 1813, Jean-de-Dieu Soult's army was repelled in its final bid to advance into Spain. After a costly assault followed by a brutal sack of the city, the Allies also brought the siege of San Sebastián to a successful conclusion in early September. A French garrison held out in the Siege of Pamplona which would end in a surrender on October 31. Wellington determined to create a bridgehead across the Bidassoa River. If successful, his army would be the first Allied army to establish itself on French soil. The British commander also wanted to capture French positions that overlooked the Allied lines on the west side of the Bidassoa.

=== Preparations ===
Because the French troops had begun to plunder their fellow citizens, Emperor Napoleon's Minister of War, Henri Jacques Guillaume Clarke ordered Marshal Soult to defend a position as close to the frontier as possible. He had to hold a 48 km (30 mi) front in the Pyrenees mountains. The area was highly defensible, but lateral communications were poor.

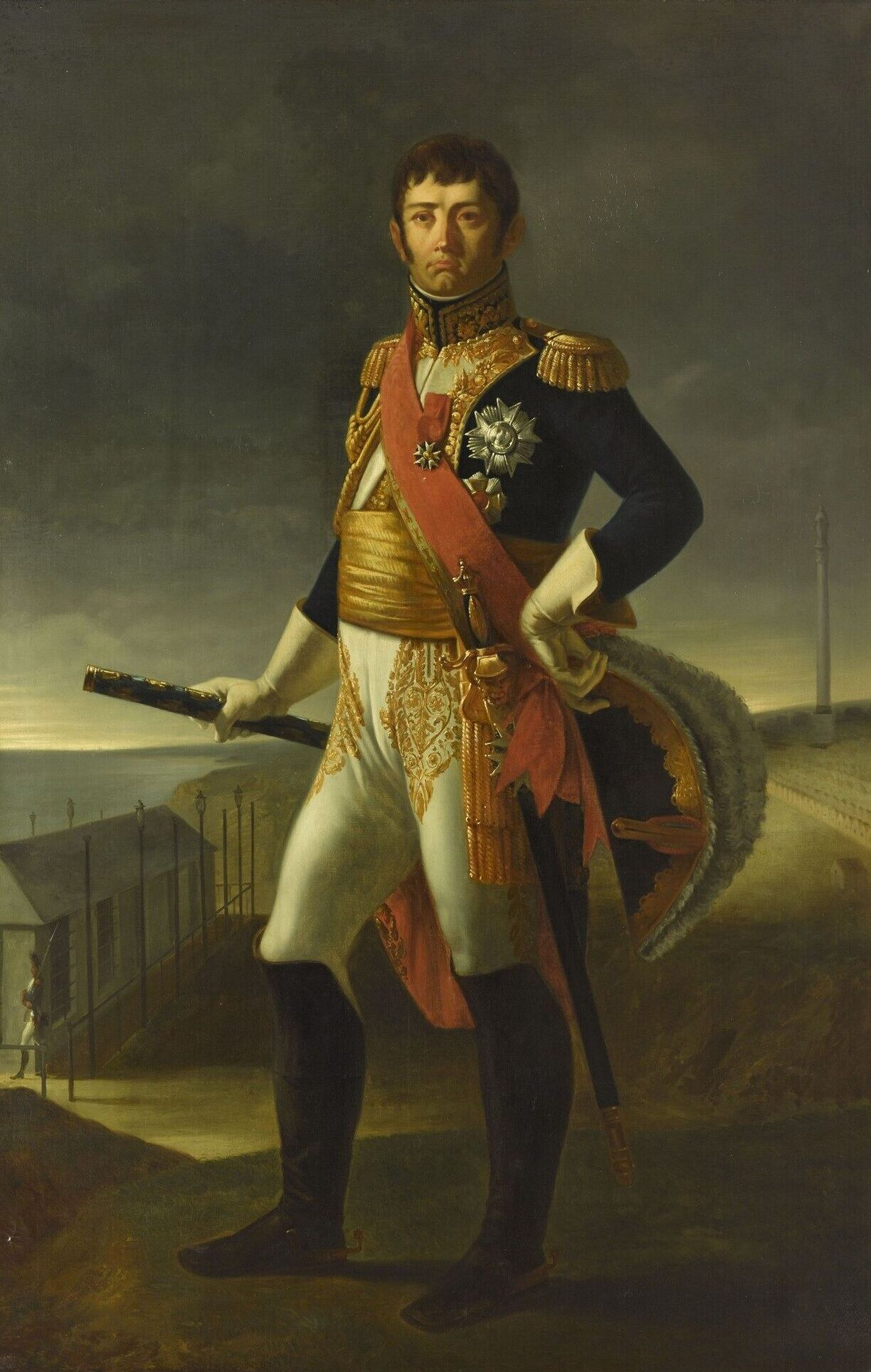
Marshal Jean-de-Dieu Soult

Deciding that the coastal sector was the strongest part of his line, Soult posted General of Division Honoré Charles Reille and 10,550 men to defend that sector. Reille's command included General of Division Antoine Louis Popon de Maucune's 3,996-strong 7th Division and General of Division Pierre François Xavier Boyer's 6,515-strong 9th Division. Maucune held the lower Bidassoa on the Bay of Biscay, while Boyer defended the stream farther inland. Behind them was the entrenched camp of Bordagain and the port of St-Jean-de-Luz which were held by General of Division Eugene-Casimir Villatte's 8,018-man Reserve Division.

General of Division Bertrand Clausel held the centre with 15,300 men under Generals of Division Nicolas François Conroux, Jean-Pierre Maransin, and Eloi Charlemagne Taupin. On the right, near the Bidassoa, stood the La Bayonette redoubt. Mont La Rhune (Larrun) rose in the center of Clausel's sector. His left touched the Nivelle River near Ainhoa. Conroux's 4th Division numbered 4,962 men; Maransin's 5th Division counted 5,575 troops; Taupin's 8th Division had 4,778 soldiers and held the area just north of Bera. Soult's gunners, sappers, and other troops added up to 2,000 and his total forces numbered 55,088 effectives. His cavalry was stationed in the Nive valley.

Fearing an allied thrust over the Maya Pass and down the Nivelle River to the sea, Soult gave General of Division Jean-Baptiste Drouet, Comte d'Erlon 19,200 men to hold his left flank. D'Erlon's corps included the soldiers of Generals of Division Maximilien Sebastien Foy, Jean Barthélemy Darmagnac, Louis Jean Nicolas Abbé, and Augustin Darricau. These troops held a line from Ainhoa to the mountain fortress of St-Jean-Pied-de-Port, covering the Maya and Roncevaux Passes. Darricau's 4,092-man 6th Division was deployed between Ainhoa and Sare; Abbé's 6,051-strong 3rd Division was west of Ainhoa; Darmagnac's 4,447-man 2nd Division held Ainhoa; Foy's 4,654-strong 1st Division held the fortress at the extreme left flank.

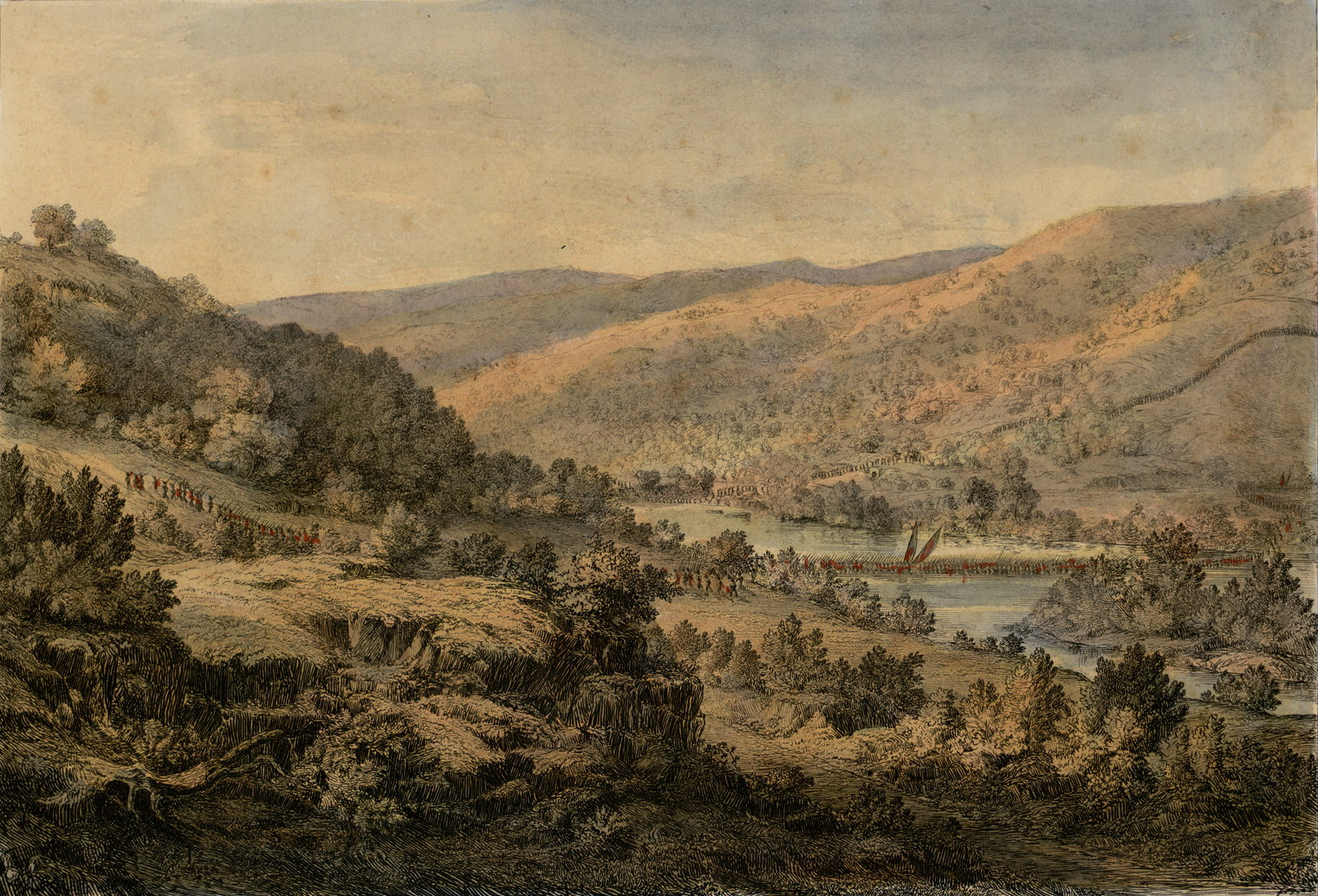
The Guards entering France, 7th Oct. 1813 by Robert Batty.

Wellington had 64,000 Anglo-Portuguese infantry and artillery, plus 25,000 Spanish soldiers from the Army of Galicia. Since cavalry was of little use in the mountains, the British commander sent most of his horse regiments to the rear, keeping a few light dragoons for patrolling. In order to gain his bridgehead, Wellington had to force a crossing of the Bidassoa estuary. The river was 910 metres (1,000 yards) wide and 6 metres (20 feet) deep at the high-water mark below the Île de la Conference. The French never suspected that there was only 4 feet (1.2 m) of water over the lower fords at certain low tides, a fact that the Allies gleaned from Basque fishermen. Allied intelligence knew that the next low tide was 7 October.

The crossing was meticulously planned. Near the lower fords, British engineers built a turf wall near the river. This would shelter Andrew Hay's 5th Division during the time before it crossed the river. Wellington positioned five field batteries and three 18-pound siege cannon to provide fire support to the attacking infantry.

== Battle ==
=== Allied Army ===
Arthur Wellesley, Marquess of Wellington (89,000, 24,000 engaged)

Coastal Sector (Note: Only the engaged units are listed in the order of battle.)	La Rhune Sector
1st Division: Major General Kenneth Howard; 1st Brigade: Colonel Peregrine Maitland; 1/1st Foot Guards, 3/1st Foot Guards, 1 company (coy) 5/60th Foot; 2nd Brigade: Major General Edward Stopford; 2/24th Foot, 1/42nd Foot, 2/58th Foot, 1/79th Foot, 1 coy 5/60th; 3rd Brigade: Colonel Colin Halkett; 1st, 2nd, and 5th King's German Legion (KGL) Line battalions (bns); British Brigade: Major General Matthew Whitworth-Aylmer, Lord Aylmer (attached); 76th Foot, 2/84th Foot, 85th Foot; Portuguese Brigade: Major General Thomas Bradford (attached); 13th and 24th Line Regiments (Regts), 5th Caçadores bn; 5th Division: Major General Andrew Hay; 1st Brigade: Colonel Charles Greville; 3/1st Foot, 1/9th Foot, 1/38th Foot, 1 coy Brunswick Oels; 2nd Brigade: Major General Frederick P. Robinson; 1/4th Foot, 2/47th Foot, 2/59th Foot, 1 coy Brunswick Oels; Portuguese Brigade: Brigadier General Luís do Rego; 3rd and 15th Line Regts, 8th Caçadores bn; Spanish Corps: Lieutenant General Manuel Alberto Freire de Andrade y Armijo; 3rd Division: Major General Del Barco; 4th Division: Major General Barcena; Artillery; Royal Artillery/Royal Horse Artillery	Light Division: Major General Charles Alten; 1st Brigade: Major General James Kempt; 1/43rd Foot, 1/95th Rifles, 3/95th Rifles, 3rd Caçadores bn; 2nd Brigade: Lieutenant Colonel John Colborne; 1/52nd Foot, 2/95th Rifles, 17th Portuguese Line Regt, 1st Caçadores bn; 6th Division: Lieutenant General Henry Clinton; Portuguese Brigade: Major General George Allan Madden; 8th and 12th Line Regts, 8th Caçadores bn; Reserve of Andalusia: Lieutenant General Pedro Agustín Girón; 1st Division: Major General Virues; 2nd Division: Major General La Torre; 6th Galician Division: Brigadier General Francisco de Longa; Artillery; Royal Artillery/Royal Horse Artillery; Lawson's Company RA

=== French Army ===
Soult's Army defending the Bidassoa River in October 1813
Corps	Division	Battalions	Strength
Right; General of Division Honoré Charles Reille	7th Division: General of Division Antoine Louis Popon de Maucune	8	3,996
Right; General of Division Honoré Charles Reille	9th Division: General of Division Pierre François Joseph Boyer	12	6,515
Center; General of Division Bertrand Clausel	4th Division: General of Division Nicolas François Conroux	9	4,962
Center; General of Division Bertrand Clausel	5th Division: General of Division Jean-Pierre Maransin	9	5,575
Center; General of Division Bertrand Clausel	8th Division: General of Division Eloi Charlemagne Taupin	10	4,778
Left; General of Division Jean-Baptiste Drouet, Comte d'Erlon	1st Division: General of Division Maximilien Sebastien Foy	8	4,654
Left; General of Division Jean-Baptiste Drouet, Comte d'Erlon	2nd Division: General of Division Jean Barthélemy Darmagnac	9	4,447
Left; General of Division Jean-Baptiste Drouet, Comte d'Erlon	3rd Division: General of Division Louis Jean Nicolas Abbé	8	6,051
Left; General of Division Jean-Baptiste Drouet, Comte d'Erlon	6th Division: General of Division Augustin Darricau	7	4,092
Reserve; General of Division Eugene-Casimir Villatte	8th Division: General of Division Eugene-Casimir Villatte	18	8,018
Reserve; General of Division Eugene-Casimir Villatte	Artillery:	-	2,000

=== Bidassoa ===
At 7:25 am the 5th Division launched its attack from near Hondarribia (Fuenterrabia). It came as a complete surprise to the French, who had deployed only Maucune's 4,000 men to defend six km (four miles) of river. Immediately, Hay's men gained a foothold at the village of Hendaye and swung two brigades to the right to assist the crossing of Kenneth Howard's 1st Division. At 8:00 am, Howard's men, Thomas Bradford's independent Portuguese brigade and Lord Aylmer's independent British brigade forded the river near a destroyed bridge at Béhobie. Three Spanish brigades from Manuel Freire's two divisions (Del Barco and Barcena) crossed farther to the right. Rapidly, the British overran the Croix des Bouquets position and the Spanish captured Mont Calvaire at 43°20′16″N 1°43′7″W. The entire ridge on the French side of the river fell into Allied hands at the cost of only 400 casualties. With the high ground in his possession, Wellington suspended the attack.

That morning Soult was absorbed in watching Henry Clinton's 6th Division advancing from the Maya Pass. The division's Portuguese brigade boldly seized the Urdax ironworks, losing 150 men in the combat. Soult suddenly realised the operation was only a demonstration. He rode off to his coastal sector but he was too late to help Reille.

=== La Rhune ===
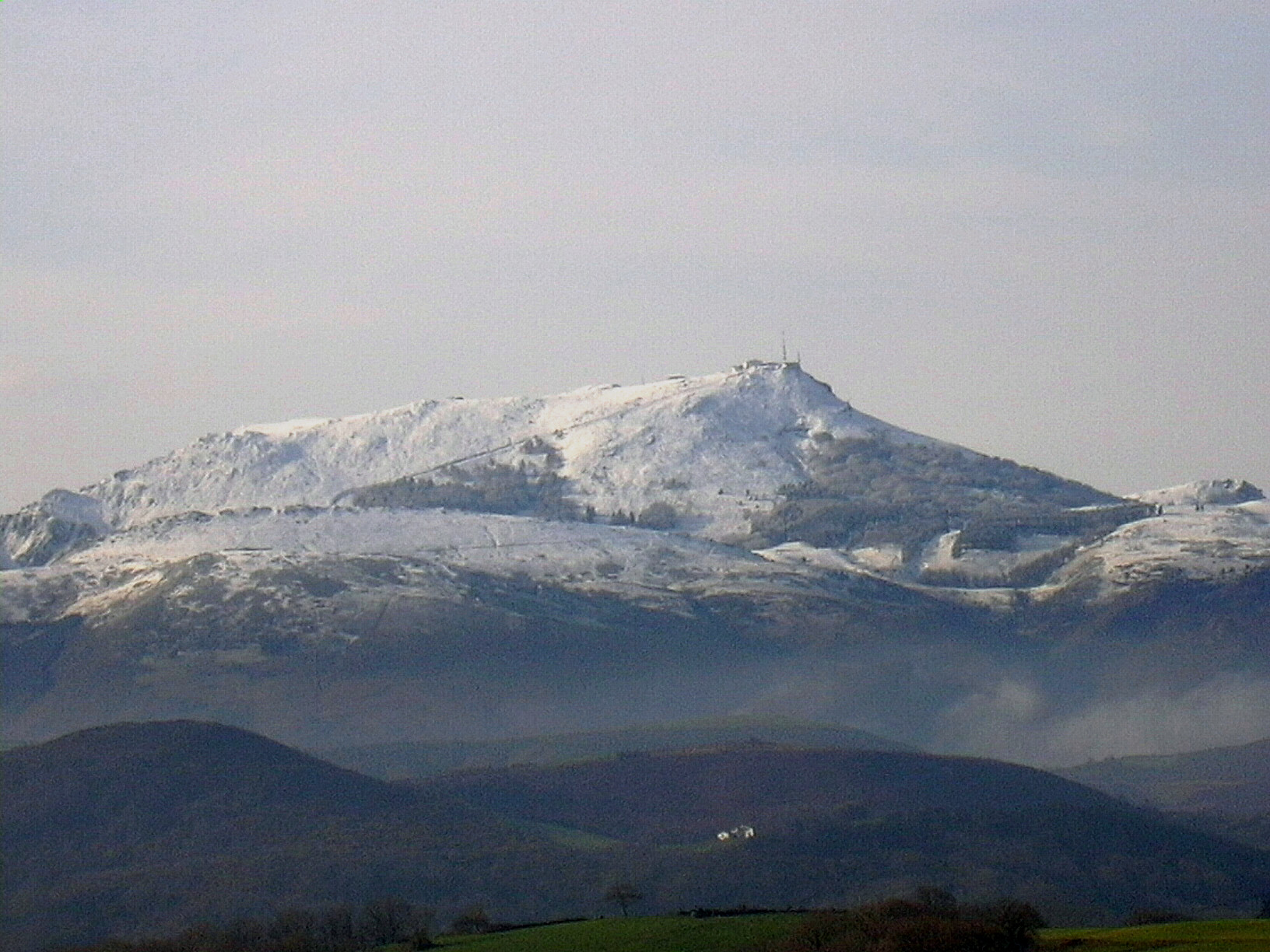
La Rhune, where the French repelled a Spanish attack.

The toughest fighting of the day occurred in Clausel's sector. John Colborne's brigade of Charles Alten's Light Division attacked La Bayonette at 43°18′35″N 1°42′12″W. The French charged downhill and drove back the green-jacketed skirmishers of the 95th Rifles Foot. Suddenly the 1/52nd (Oxfordshire) Regiment of Foot (Light Infantry) appeared out of the trees and quickly turned the tables. Following closely behind the retreating French, the redcoats of the 52nd overran the redoubt with surprising ease.

Meanwhile, James Kempt's other Light Division brigade and Francisco de Longa's Spanish division attacked up two spurs of La Rhune to secure some positions. To their right, Pedro Girón's two Andalusian divisions (Virues and La Torre) attacked the summit of La Rhune. Though the Spanish attacked repeatedly, they were defeated. However, the next day the French abandoned the position to avoid encirclement.

== Aftermath ==
The Allies were victorious for the first time on French soil. In Reille's sector, the French lost 390 killed and wounded, plus 60 men and eight cannons captured. In Clausel's sector, the French suffered 600 killed and wounded, plus 598 men and nine cannons captured. The British lost 82 killed, 486 wounded, and five missing, or a total of 573. The Portuguese lost 48 killed, 186 wounded, and eight missing, or a total of 242. The Spanish suffered the balance of the 1,600 total Allied casualties. The defeat lowered morale in Soult's army. Except at La Rhune, French troops did not obstinately defend their positions. Villatte commented, "with troops like these we can expect only disgrace". Soult made Maucune the scapegoat, dismissed him from his division, and sent him to the rear. After the battle, some of the Allied troops indulged themselves in the looting of French homes and towns. Wellington came down harshly on British troops caught plundering. He felt sympathetic to the Spanish, who had seen their nation ravaged by French soldiers, but he determined to tolerate no looting for fear of provoking a guerilla war.

During the follow-up to this victory, Spanish troops seized the Sainte-Barbe Redoubt at 43°18′1″N 1°34′55″W, 1.4 kilometres (0.9 mi) south of the village of Sare. On 12 October, Conroux's division recaptured the fort from its garrison of La Torre's division and drove off a five-battalion Spanish counterattack. French casualties are estimated at 300, while the Spanish lost 300 killed and wounded, plus 200 captured. The next engagement was the Battle of Nivelle on 10 November 1813.

== Notes ==
Preceded by Battle of Wartenburg	Napoleonic Wars; Battle of the Bidassoa	Succeeded by Battle of Leipzig
