= Battle of San Marcial =

1813 battle of the Peninsular War

- Part of the Peninsular War
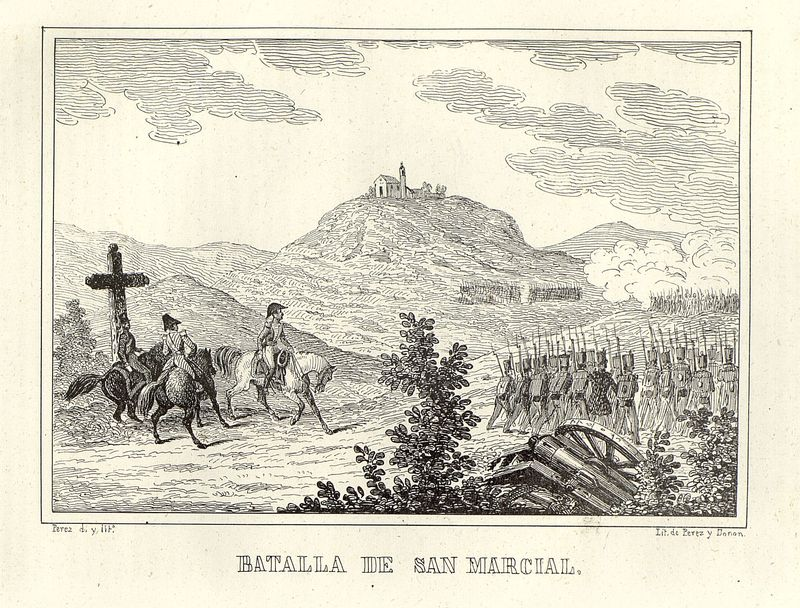
- c. 1844 engraving of the battle
Date	31 August 1813
Location	Near Irun, Spain 43°19′40″N 1°45′41″W
Result	Spanish victory

Belligerents
Spain	France

Commanders and leaders
Manuel Freire de Andrade; Gabriel de Mendizábal	Jean-de-Dieu Soult

Strength
16,000	18,000

Casualties and losses
2,500 killed or wounded	4,000 killed or wounded

The Battle of San Marcial took place on 31 August 1813 near Irún, close to the Franco-Spanish border, as part of the Peninsular War. The Spanish Army of Galicia under Manuel Freire de Andrade repulsed a French attack led by Jean-de-Dieu Soult. The battle was named after the heights of San Marcial which were held by the Spanish.

== Background ==
Following victory at Vitoria in June 1813, Lord Wellington besieged San Sebastián, aiming to capture it while the French army withdrew eastwards. San Sebastián and Pamplona sat on Wellington's flanks, guarding the approaches to the French border, and needed to be taken before advancing into France. However, the French garrison led by Louis Emmanuel Rey defended the town with determination, with the British losing 600 men killed in a 26 July attack. Before Wellington could organise a new effort, he learned Jean-de-Dieu Soult had rebuilt his field army far faster than expected, and the siege was suspended to confront him.

Peninsular War
Vitoria and the Pyrenees, 1813–1814
current battle

While Wellington faced off against Soult at the Battle of the Pyrenees, Lieutenant-general Thomas Graham maintained a blockade of San Sebastián and prepared for the resumption of the siege on 26 August. A line of light fortifications was put up to guard against a relief effort by Soult, and a strong cordon was established up to the banks of the Bidasoa. In addition to the Anglo-Portuguese divisions at Vera, Lesaca, and Irun, this screen included the Spanish 3rd, 5th, and 7th divisions on the San Marcial heights, as well as two brigades of the 4th division in reserve (forming Manuel Freire de Andrade's 4th Army, or Army of Galicia).

After four weeks of rest, Soult was, in fact, preparing one last push toward San Sebastián, concentrating all his nine divisions at Ainhoue for an attack in the vicinity of San Marcial. Neither the French nor the Spanish troops were in perfect spirits; the French were demoralized by their recent retreats and their heart was not in the coming fight, while Freire's ragged troops, neglected by the Spanish commissariat, had not enjoyed full rations in several days. Behind them, the allied army was locked in a terrible struggle for San Sebastián that would cost it 2,376 dead and wounded on 31 August alone.

== Battle ==
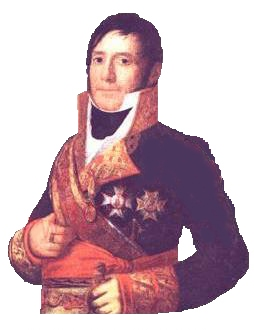
Gabriel de Mendizábal, a Spanish officer who took part in the battle

In an early morning mist, seven French divisions crept toward the Bidassoa on August 31, fording the river under cover of their guns. The allied positions at Vera and Irun were surprised and overrun but not before having alerted Freire, who drew his troops into a line on the heights. The Imperial columns lost all cohesion as they climbed over the difficult terrain, reaching Freire in a confused mass. The Spaniards welcomed them with a scathing volley and, advancing with fixed bayonets, forced Soult's leading divisions back down the hill.

Soult rallied the broken units at noon and committed fresh troops to a second assault on the heights, but the line of Spanish bayonets held firm against his final assault and the faltering French were badly beaten. Unable to keep his men from retreating back over the river, Soult ordered a withdrawal back to Irun and called off his offensive without having met a single red coat: When, towards the end of the battle, Freire requested reinforcements from the British to shore up his battered line, Wellington replied, "As he has already won his victory, he should keep the honour of it for his countrymen alone."

== Combat of Vera ==
During the afternoon, a violent thunderstorm struck the area and brought in torrents of rain. By the time General of Division Bertrand Clausel's rearguard reached the fords over the Bidassoa, there were six feet of water over them. The rearguard commander, General of Division Vandermaesen, led 10,000 men upstream to Vera (Bera). The 50-yard-long (46 m) bridge at Vera would only admit a column three or four men wide, but it was the only possible escape route. A 70-man company of the green-jacketed, rifle-armed British 95th Regiment under Captain Daniel Cadoux held the village with two sentries posted at the bridge. At 2:00 am on 1 September, the French successfully rushed the bridge, but could go no farther. In the heavy rain, the muskets of the French would not fire so they had to resort to the bayonet. Meanwhile, the British riflemen were secure with dry gunpowder in loopholed buildings. Over and over, the French tried to rush the buildings at the end of the bridge, but they were mown down in heaps by rifle fire.

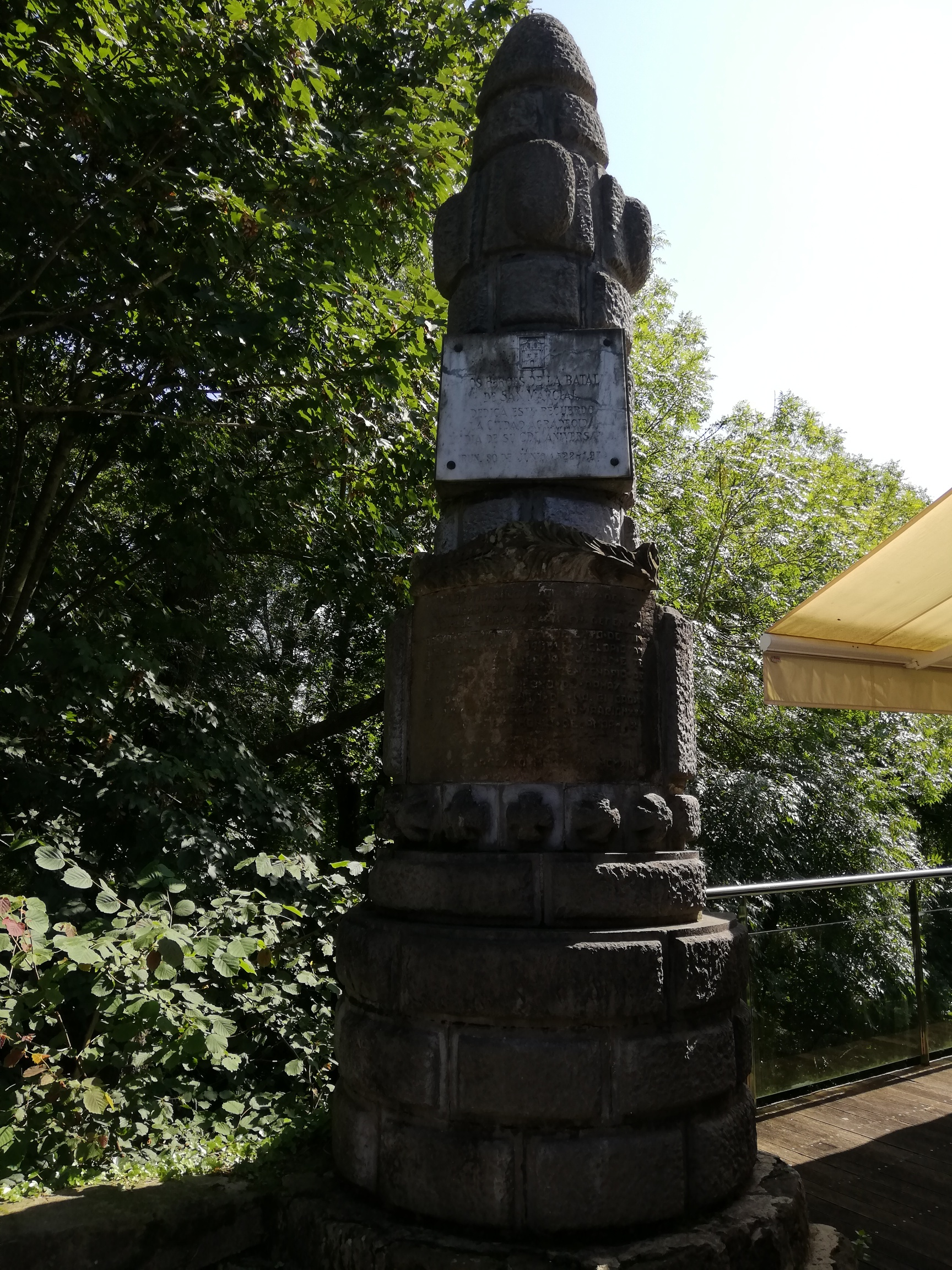
Monolith that recalls the battle of San Marcial

Cadoux sent for assistance from a brigade of the Light Division that was camped a mile away. Incredibly, Major General Skerrett refused to send help. Instead, he ordered Cadoux to withdraw. The captain refused to obey and held his post against repeated attacks. At length, Skerrett repeated his order to withdraw. Cadoux, who had only lost his two sentries, reluctantly prepared to obey. However, it was now dawn, the rain had stopped and the gunpowder of the French was now dry. As the green-jackets abandoned the buildings, the French opened fire, killing Cadoux and 16 of his men and leaving many more wounded. Abandoning their artillery, the French filed over the now-undefended span to escape from the trap. Vandermaesen lay among the dead.

== Aftermath ==
The battle marked the end of Soult's once redoubtable fighting force: "war-weary and despondent, Soult's divisions had lost all heart and, except in a few inspired flashes, were never again to fight with their once customary skill and zeal".

The Spanish army's performance at San Marcial, together with that of General Zayas's Division at the Battle of Albuera and General Castaños's army at the Battle of Bailén, was among its best efforts of the Peninsular War. The next action would be the Battle of the Bidassoa, on 7 October.

== See also ==
- Battle of the Pyrenees
- Battle of Nivelle

== Sources ==
- Gates, David (2001). The Spanish Ulcer: A History of the Peninsular War. Da Capo Press. ISBN 0-306-81083-2.
- Gifford, C. A. (1817). The Life of the Most Noble Arthur, Duke of Wellington. London: W.Lewis. p. 375.
- Glover, Michael (1974). The Peninsular War 1807–1814. Penguin. ISBN 0-14-139041-7.

Preceded by Battle of Kulm	Napoleonic Wars; Battle of San Marcial	Succeeded by Battle of Dennewitz
