= Battle of Nivelle =

1813 battle of the campaign in south-west France

- Part of the campaign in south-west France
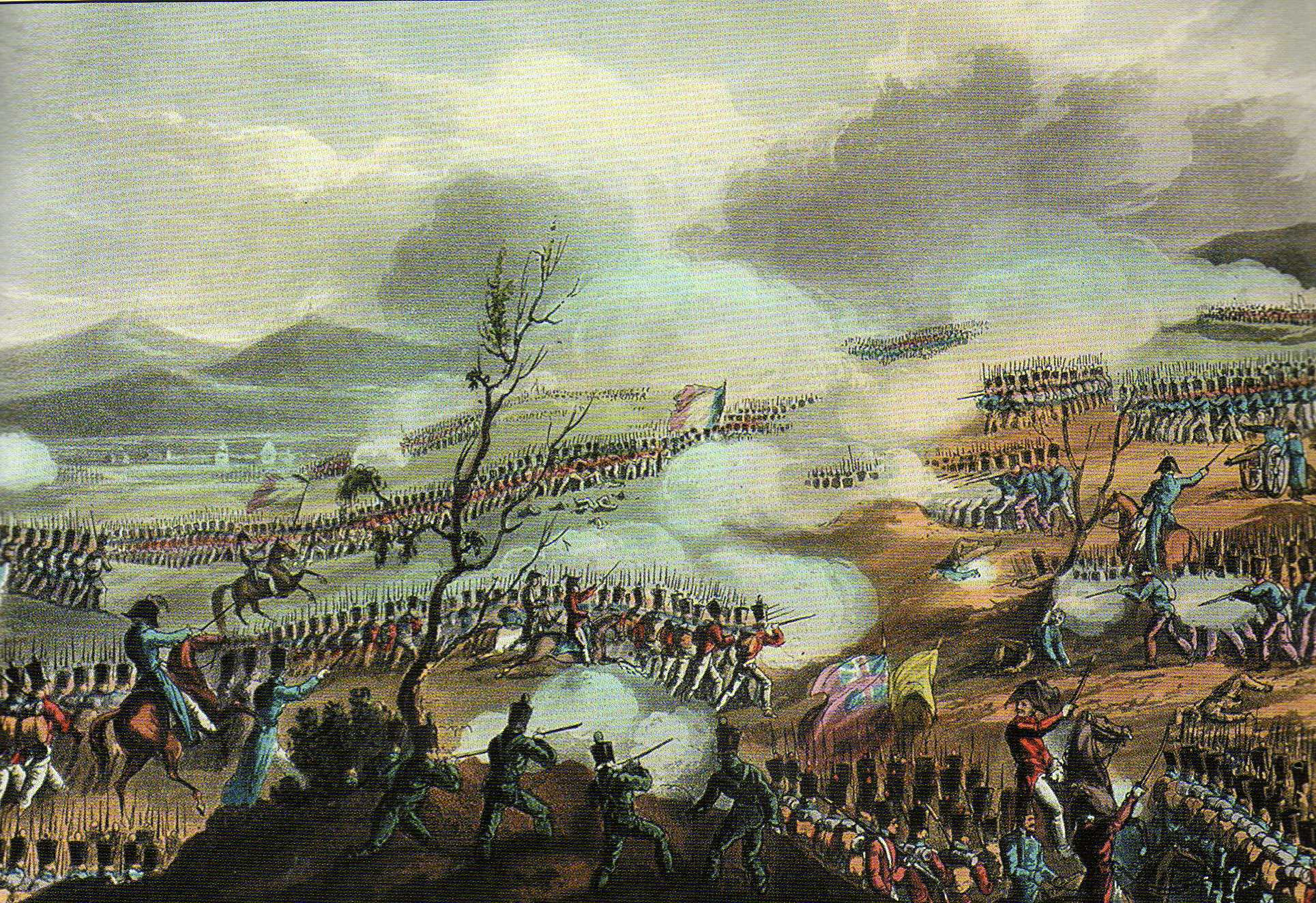
- Engraving of the battle by Thomas Sutherland
Date	10 November 1813
Location	Nivelle, Basses-Pyrénées 43°19′48″N 1°32′37″W
Result	Coalition victory

Belligerents
United Kingdom; Portugal; Spain	France

Commanders and leaders
(United Kingdom) Marquess of Wellington (United Kingdom) Sir John Hamilton	(First French Empire) Jean-de-Dieu Soult

Strength
90,000 (50,000 engaged)	50,000 (18,000 engaged)

Casualties and losses
5,300 killed or wounded 200 captured (2,800 Anglo–Portuguese and 2,700 Spanish)	3,200 killed or wounded 1,300 captured
- Location within Europe

Peninsular War:
Campaign in south-west France
current battle

The Battle of Nivelle took place on 10 November 1813 in front of the river Nivelle near the end of the Peninsular War (1808–1814). After the Allied siege of San Sebastian, Wellington's 80,000 British, Portuguese and Spanish troops (20,000 of the Spaniards were untried in battle) were in hot pursuit of Jean-de-Dieu Soult who had 60,000 men to place in a 20-mile perimeter, (32.1 km) which presented strong defensive positions. The French troops were overextended and could not have reserves behind them. After the Light Division, the main British army was ordered to attack and the 3rd Division split Soult's army in two. By two o'clock, Soult was in retreat and the British in a strong offensive position. Soult had lost another battle on French soil and had lost 4,500 men to Wellington's 5,500.

== Background ==
In the Siege of San Sebastian, the Anglo-Portuguese Army stormed and captured the port at the beginning of September 1813. In the Battle of San Marcial on 31 August, Jean-de-Dieu Soult failed to break through the Spanish defences in his final attempt to relieve the siege. The French army then fell back to defend the Bidassoa River, which forms the French-Spanish frontier near the coast.

At dawn on 7 October, the Anglo-Allied army overran the French river defences in the Battle of the Bidassoa in a surprise crossing. During this action, the allies also captured several fortified positions in the area of La Rhune mountain. Both sides lost about 1,600 men in these actions.

== Disposition ==
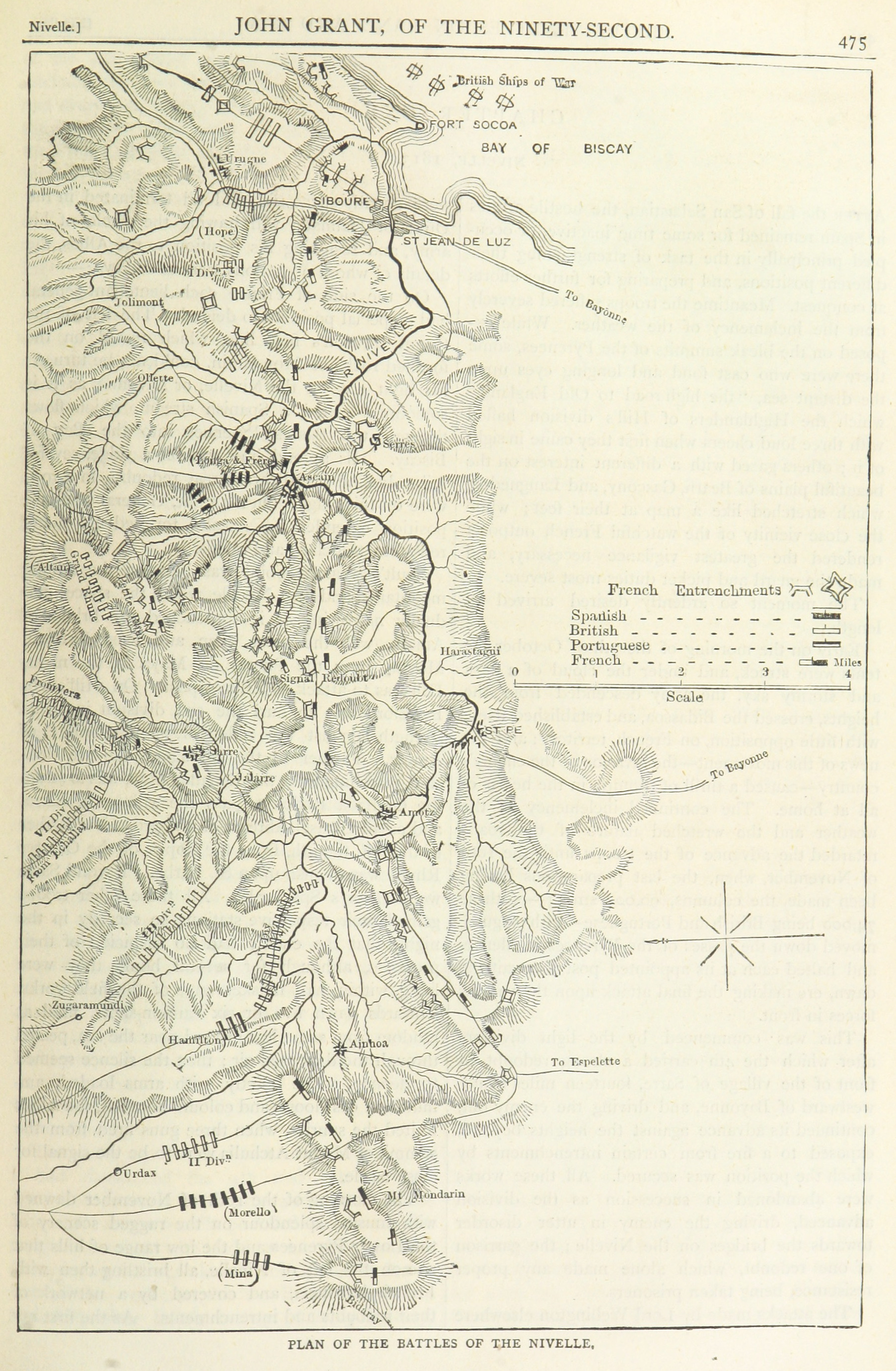
A map of the battle

Arrayed in front of the course of the River Nivelle, whose route was marked by a series of hills on which the French had built strong defensive positions or redoubts, was the French army under Marshal Soult. Soult's lines stretched from the shores of the Atlantic on the French right flank to the snow-covered pass of Roncesvalles on the left, a perimeter of about twenty miles. With only 50,000 men, Soult was stretched to an almost impossible point. This also meant that he could not hold troops back as reserves, something which might have turned the tide of the battle. As Soult moved back to his base at Bayonne, his position strengthened but he was not quick enough and Wellington caught him up.

The French position was dominated by the Greater Rhune, a gorse-covered, craggy mountain nearly 3,000 feet high. Separated from the Greater Rhune by a ravine, roughly 700 yards below it, is the Lesser Rhune along the precipitous crest of which the French had constructed three defensive positions. If the French defences on La Rhune could be taken Soult's position would become very dangerous as it would open him to attack from all elements of the British three-point pincer plan.

Wellington's plan was to distribute troops along the whole of Soult's line but make his main attack in the centre. Any breakthrough in the centre or the French left flank would enable the British to cut off the French right flank. So, Wellington ordered that the British left (attacking the French right) would be led by Sir John Hope and would involve the 1st and 5th Divisions as well as Freire's Spaniards. Beresford would lead the main Allied attack against the French centre with the 3rd, 4th, 7th and Light Divisions, while on the British right (attacking the French left ) Hill would attack with the 2nd and 6th Divisions, supported by Morillo's Spaniards and Hamilton's Portuguese. Wellington decided to attack on 10 November.

== Battle ==
The battle started just before dawn as the Light Division headed towards the plateau on the summit of the Greater Rhune (the summit had been garrisoned by French troops but they had fled after the skirmish on the River Bidassoa, fearing to be cut off from their own army). The objective of the division was to sweep the three defensive forts the French had constructed out of the battle. They moved down into the ravine in front of the Lesser Rhune and were ordered to lie down and await the order to attack. After the signal from a battery of cannon, the offensive began. It started with the men of the 43rd, 52nd and 95th – with the 17th Portuguese infantry Regiment in support – storming the redoubts on the crest of the Rhune. Despite this being a risky move and the men being almost exhausted, the surprise and boldness of the British sent the French fleeing towards other forts on other hills.

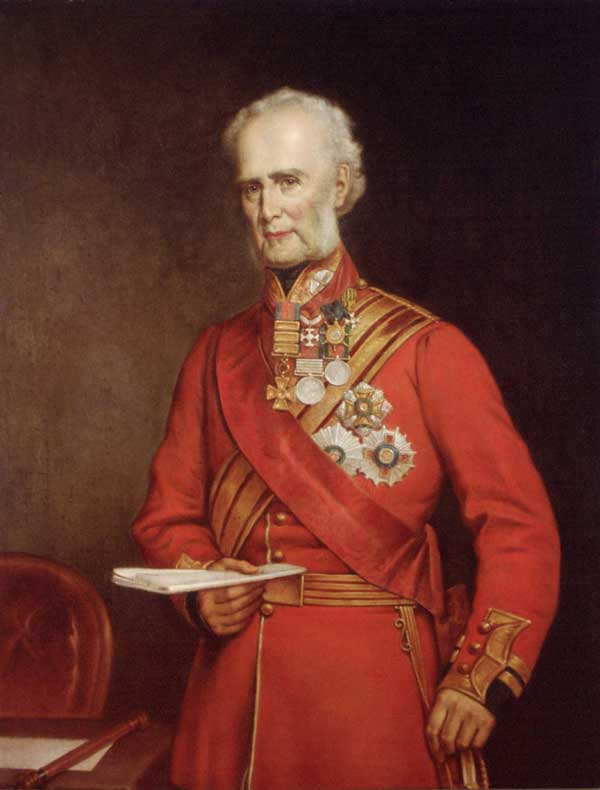
John Colborne

While the 43rd and 95th were dealing with the French on the Rhune, there still remained one very strong star-shaped fort below on the Mouiz plateau which reached out towards the coast. This was attacked by Colborne's 52nd Light Infantry, supported by riflemen from the 95th. Once again, the French were surprised and the British succeeded. They had, in the French eyes, appeared from the ground at which point, in danger of being cut off, the French soldiers quickly fled leaving Colborne in possession of the fort and other trenches without suffering a single fatality.

Shortly, the main British assault began, with the nine divisions fanning out over a five-mile front. When the 3rd Division took the bridge at Amotz, all French resistance broke as any communication between the two halves of Soult's army was now impossible. The French resistance melted away and soon they were in full retreat (by two o'clock they were streaming across the Nivelle) having lost 4,500 men to Wellington's 5,500.

News of the victory reached London at the same time as reports of the Liberation of Hanover by Allied forces, leading to a double triumph.

== Notes ==
Preceded by Battle of Hanau	Napoleonic Wars; Battle of Nivelle	Succeeded by Battle of Bornhöved (1813)
