= Salamanca (wargame) =

Napoleonic board wargame

- Designers: Bob Stuart
- Publishers: Maplay Games
- Publication: 1976
- Genres: Napoleonic

Salamanca is a board wargame published by the British company Maplay Games in 1976 that simulates the Napoleonic-era Battle of Salamanca.

== Background ==
In the spring of 1812, during the Peninsular War, an Anglo-Portuguese army under the Earl of Wellington (future Duke of Wellington) marched north through the Iberian Peninsula to meet a French army under Marshal Auguste Marmont. On 22 July 1812, the two armies met a few miles outside the Spanish town of Salamanca.

== Description ==
Salamanca is a 2-player board wargame in which one side controls Anglo-Portuguese forces, and the other side controls French forces.

=== Gameplay ===
The game system uses a simple "I Go, You Go" system of alternating turns:

- Move
- Cavalry retreats before combat
- Combat

Both players completing this sequence is one game turn — the game is 16 turns, each representing one hour of game time. The battle begins at 5 am and ends at 9 pm. There is a possibility of a storm between 4 pm and 7 pm that can affect the battle.

=== Victory conditions ===
The French win if 12 French units move off the west edge of the map. The Allies win by eliminating 15 French units AND they do not allow more than 4 French units off the west edge of the map. If neither side fulfills their victory conditions, the game is a draw.

== Publication history ==
The British game company Maplay had published the modern tactical wargame Guerrilla in 1974, and followed this up with a Napoleonic game, Salamanca, designed by Bob Stuart and published in 1976. This was to be the last game released by Maplay — the company went out of business shortly afterwards.

== Reception ==
In Issue 12 of Perfidious Albion, Charles Vasey was disappointed that the cavalry had no differentiated abilities from infantry other than a faster speed, commenting, "Even at this scale, I would have liked to have seen some greater distinction between the major arms [infantry, cavalry, artillery]." Vasey also noted the lack of leaders in this game, which he considered essential, noting, "When one considers the effect of the incapacity of people like Marmont, Sarrut, Maucune and Le Marchant had on the actual battle, let alone what would have happened if Wellington had been killed early on when he would not have been replaced by the competent Beresford or able Hill but a typical position-by-birth conservative, then one can see the importance of leaders." Vasey concluded, "It is good to see a well produced BRITISH wargame with attractive box and rules booklet."

In the January 1977 issue of Europa, Bob Latter commented, "Definitely worth considering if you are a Napoleonics-era fan." However, Latter then continued, "On the other hand, unfortunately, I cannot recommend the game as highly as I would like to .... although the research is impressive, the game is a little unwieldy in play, not for the usual reason of poor rules, but more for the problem of counting through large piles of unit counters close together to compute Combat Factors." Latter also wondered "if one would learn much about the battle of Salamanca or even Napoleonic warfare from the game." Despite this, Latter concluded, "it is well made, evenly balanced, ideal for [play-by-mail] or solo, and has many excellent features."

== Reviews ==
- Phoenix and
