= Battle of Tolosa (1813) =

1813 battle during the Peninsular War

- Part of the Peninsular War
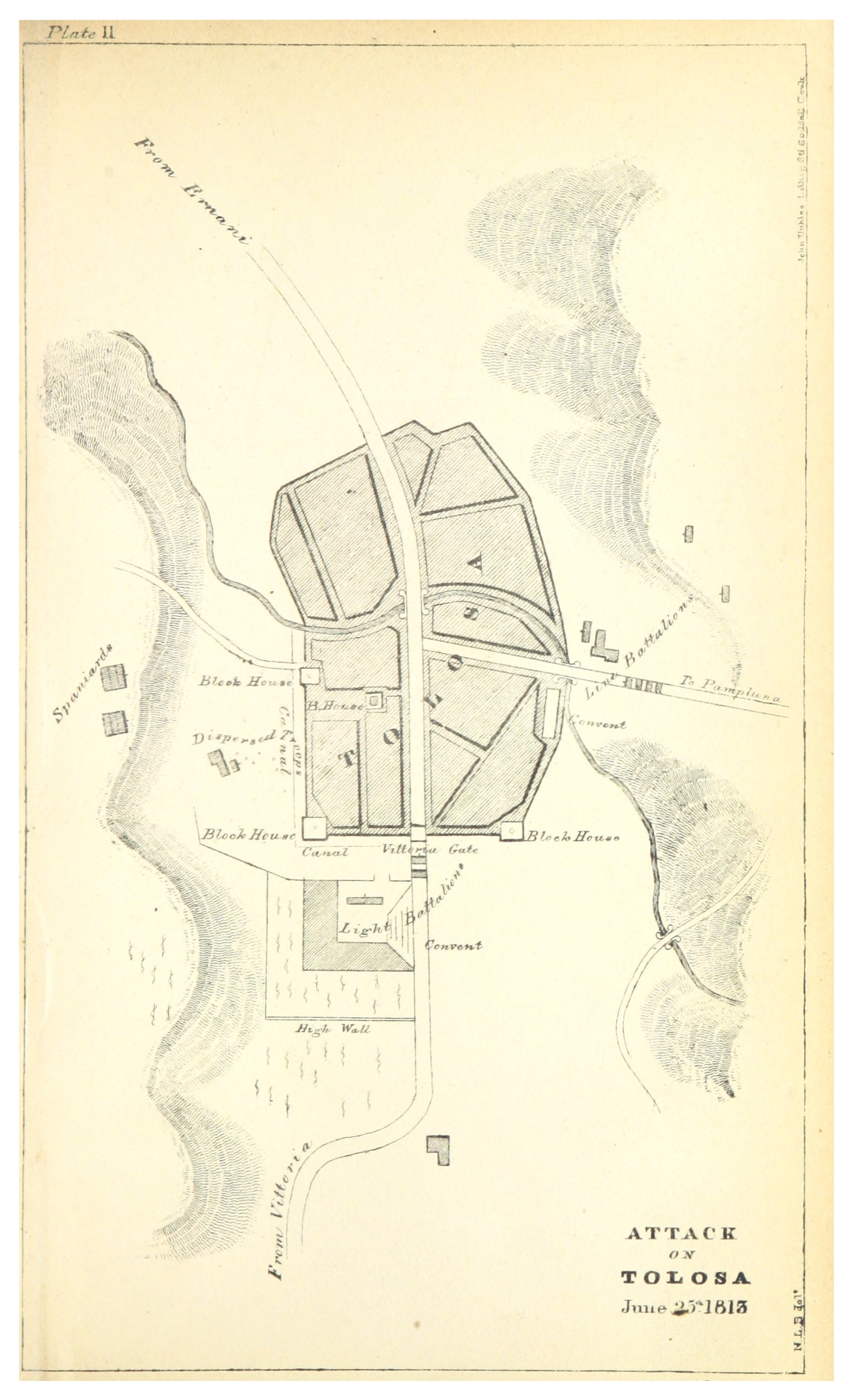
- 1832 map of the attack on Tolosa, 25 June 1813
Date	26 June 1813
Location	Tolosa, Spain 43°08′N 02°05′W
Result	Allied victory

Belligerents
United Kingdom; Portugal; Spain	(France) French Empire (Kingdom of Italy (Napoleonic)) Kingdom of Italy

Commanders and leaders
(United Kingdom) Thomas Graham (Spain) Pedro Agustín Girón (Spain) Francisco de Longa; Denis Pack	(France) Maximilien Foy (France) Antoine Maucune

Strength
(Spain) 16,000 (United Kingdom) 5,150; 4,500	(France) 14,500 (Kingdom of Italy (Napoleonic)) 1,500

Casualties and losses
24 June: 193; 26 June: 619	24 June: 300; 26 June: 400+

Peninsular War
Vitoria and the Pyrenees, 1813–1814
current battle

The Battle of Tolosa (26 June 1813) saw a British-Portuguese-Spanish column led by Thomas Graham attempt to cut off a retreating Franco-Italian force under Maximilien Sébastien Foy. Assisted by Antoine Louis Popon de Maucune's division, which fortuitously appeared, the French parried Graham's initial attacks then slipped away when threatened with envelopment. The town of Tolosa is located about 20 kilometres (12 mi) south of San Sebastián. The clash occurred during the Peninsular War, part of the wider Napoleonic Wars.

In the late spring of 1813, the Allied army of Arthur Wellesley, Marquess of Wellington launched a powerful offensive designed to drive King Joseph Bonaparte's Imperial French army from Spain. On 21 June, Wellington's army inflicted a decisive defeat on Joseph's troops at the Battle of Vitoria. As the defeated French armies withdrew toward the Pyrenees, Wellington tried to intercept Foy's column in the north and Bertrand Clausel's forces in the south. Neither Foy nor Clausel had fought at Vitoria. Graham caught up with Foy's column, but after some fighting, the French got away. Clausel also managed to avoid being cut off, but except for the Sieges of San Sebastian and Pamplona, northern Spain was soon free of French occupation. The next pitched battle was the Battle of the Pyrenees which began on 25 July.

== Background ==
=== Vitoria campaign ===
In the spring of 1813, the French were capable of deploying 95,000 troops to defend Spain against Wellington's army. There were 42,000 men in Honoré Charles Reille's Army of Portugal, 36,000 in Honoré Théodore Maxime Gazan de la Peyrière's Army of the South and 17,000 in Jean-Baptiste Drouet, Comte d'Erlon's Army of the Center. However, Emperor Napoleon ordered Reille's six divisions to hunt down Spanish guerillas in northern Spain. This operation left King Joseph Bonaparte and Marshal Jean-Baptiste Jourdan with only 33,000 infantry and 9,000 cavalry and 100 guns. When Joseph protested, his concerns were brushed aside. In fact, Wellington advanced with 52,000 British, 28,000 Portuguese and 25,000 Spanish soldiers. Meanwhile, the Army of the North counted 40,000 troops but most of these were tied up in garrisons so that only 10,000 were available for field operations. On 14 January, Napoleon ordered Clausel to replace Joseph Caffarelli in command of the Army of the North. The new leader was expected to suppress the guerillas of northern Spain and clear the main highway between France and Spain.

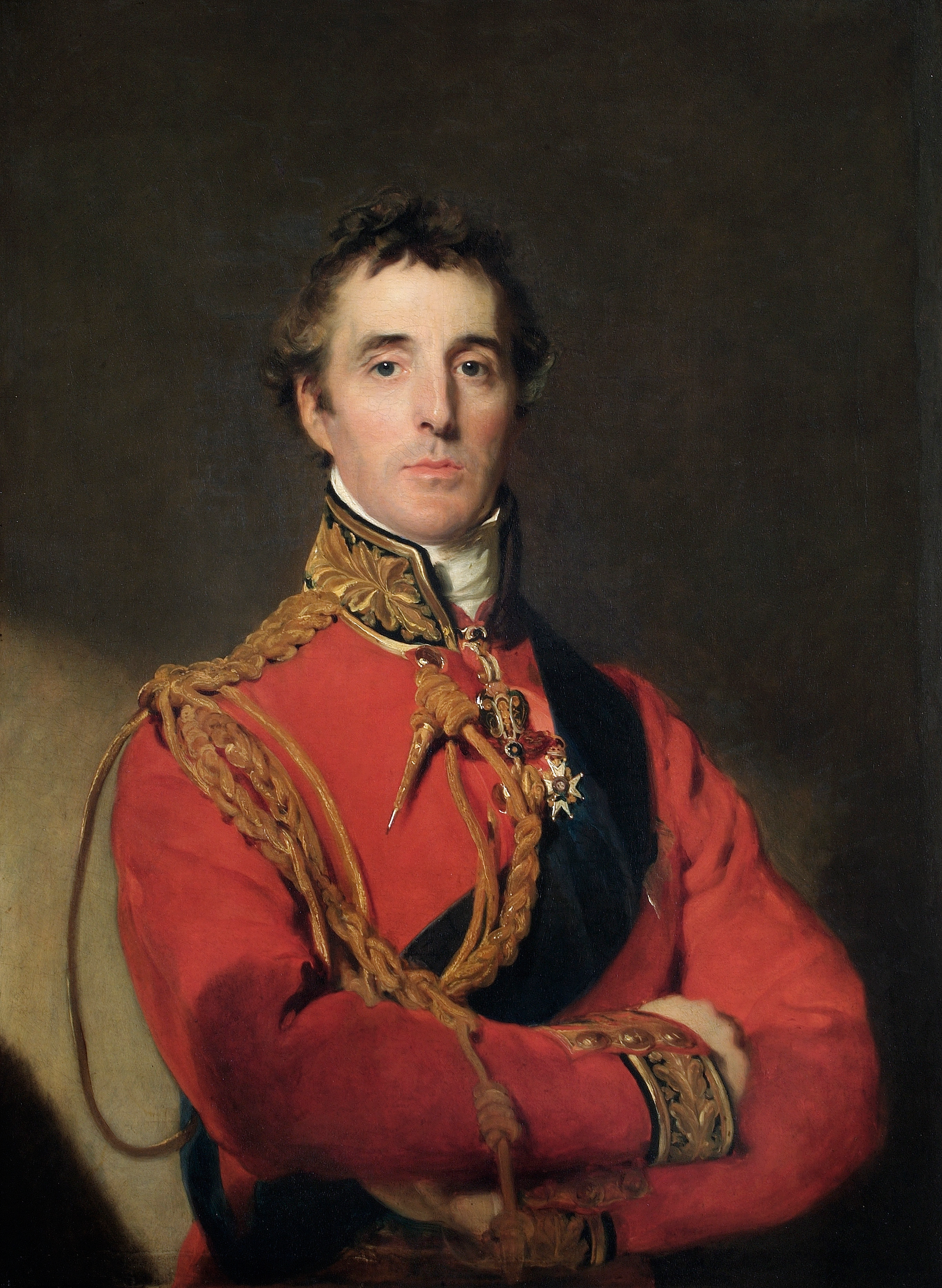
Lord Wellington

During the month of June 1813, Wellington's army repeatedly turned the French army's north flank, compelling Joseph to order a long retreat. During the withdrawal, three of Reille's divisions joined Joseph, but the location of Clausel's soldiers remained a mystery. On 18 June, Reille's three divisions blundered into the path of Wellington's advance at the Battle of San Millan-Osma. Two divisions avoided serious losses, but Maucune's division got such a drubbing that Joseph thought it was only fit to guard the army's wagon train. Wellington's advance was so rapid that the French never had time to fully concentrate their forces. Late on 19 June, Joseph's army reached Vitoria where it waited vainly for Clausel to join it. On 21 June, Wellington with 88,276 Allies with 90 guns attacked Joseph's 46,000 infantry, 9,000 cavalry and 2,300 gunners in the Battle of Vitoria. The Allies sustained losses of 4,927 men, including 850 killed, 4,035 wounded and 42 captured. The French suffered 8,008 casualties, including 756 killed, 4,414 wounded and 3,215 captured and missing. The French also lost 151 guns, 415 caissons, 25 million francs and vast amounts of loot plundered from Spain.

Though the French retreat soon degenerated into a mad scramble to the rear, the Allies failed to launch an all-out pursuit. Seven of Wellington's nine Allied cavalry brigades never came into action at all. Some of the Allied units tried to pursue the beaten French, but most others turned aside to plunder the immense wagon train of booty that their opponents left behind. There were other reasons why the French army got away. The Allied soldiers had marched 20 miles (32 km) that day and were exhausted. The two Army of Portugal divisions fought well and retreated in good order. The French 3rd Hussars and 15th Dragoons acted as the army's rearguard and fended off Allied pursuit.

Wellington's army set out in pursuit of Joseph at mid-morning on 22 June, headed east toward Salvatierra. The British commander also sent Spanish troops under Pedro Agustín Girón and Francisco de Longa to the northeast in an attempt to catch up with Maucune's convoy. At Salvatierra, Wellington sent an additional column under Graham north to cut off Foy and Maucune. Joseph's beaten army retreated past Pamplona on 24 June. D'Erlon's army was sent north toward Maya Pass via the Baztan Valley while Gazan's army moved northeast toward the Roncevaux Pass. Reille's soldiers had already earlier split off from the main body and headed north toward the Biscay coast. On 26 June, the Allies surrounded and began the Siege of Pamplona. That day Wellington received information from the Spanish guerilla leader Francisco Espoz y Mina that Clausel's column was to his south. He detailed several divisions to hunt down the French.

=== Clausel's operations ===
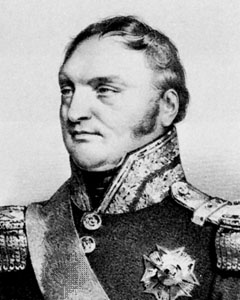
Bertrand Clausel

Clausel assumed command of the Army of the North on 21 February 1813. Meanwhile, Mina with 2,800 guerillas repulsed the attacks of the 3,150 French soldiers of Louis Jean Nicolas Abbé's Army of the North division at Tiebas-Muruarte de Reta on 8 February. After this defeat the 328 survivors of the French garrison of Tafalla surrendered. Mina inflicted another disaster on the French at Lerín on 31 March. His 2,100 guerillas surprised and wiped out two battalions that were busily sacking the town. These 1,500 troops belonged to Marie Étienne de Barbot's 2nd Division of the Army of Portugal. The Spanish captured 663 French soldiers in the debacle. Though Barbot was nearby with six battalions, he failed to intervene.

After one abortive attempt to catch Mina, Clausel decided to strike at the guerilla leader's mountain base at Roncal. He assembled Edmé-Martin Vandermaesen's division of the Army of the North plus the troops of Abbé and Barbot for the operation. Clausel left Eloi Charlemagne Taupin's 3rd Division of the Army of Portugal behind to police Navarre. The raid on 12–13 May destroyed the base and inflicted 1,000 casualties on the guerillas, but Mina himself got away. Clausel treated his prisoners humanely, but laid a harsh hand on the villages of northwest Navarre. The mountain operation was so remote that King Joseph was unable to communicate with Clausel's army.

On 27 May, Joseph sent Clausel an order asking for him to return the divisions of Barbot, Foy and Taupin, if he was finished using them. At this time it might take eight to ten days to get a courier through to Clausel's 15,000-man column. On 15 June, Clausel marched from Pamplona, heading for Logroño, hoping to join Joseph. From Logroño he turned northwest and reached Treviño on 22 June, completely unaware of the Battle of Vitoria the day before. At last, Clausel heard about the French defeat and his column marched south to Viana on 23 June. The next day he tried to go north to Salvatierra but turned around when he received reports of the magnitude of the Vitoria disaster. On 25 June Clausel picked up the garrison of Logroño and marched northeast toward Pamplona. But reports that the British were trying to intercept his column caused him to swerve south and cross the Ebro River at Lodosa on 26 June.

Wellington ordered two columns to hunt down Clausel. Henry Clinton with the British 6th Division and Robert Hill's Household Cavalry brigade started from Vitoria on 26 June. Clinton pursued as far as Lerín but turned back when he realized that Clausel had a 2-day lead. Lowry Cole with the British 4th and Light Divisions and Colquhoun Grant's hussar brigade set out from Pamplona toward Tafalla on 26 June. They were to be followed by the British 3rd and 7th Divisions and William Ponsonby's heavy cavalry brigade.

On 28 June Clausel reached Tudela and picked up its garrison before heading southeast along the Ebro River. By 30 June his column was at Zaragoza where Clausel gave his soldiers three days of rest. Then the column headed north to Jaca which was reached on 6 July. Clausel crossed the Pyrenees by the Somport (Canfranc) Pass on 12 July with 11,000 infantry, 500 cavalry and six mountain guns. Approximately 1,500 men became sick or could not keep up and became Mina's prisoners. After turning Cole's column east, Wellington abandoned his effort to cut off Clausel on 29 June. The Allied soldiers regarded the chase after Clausel to be a fool's errand and there had been a great deal of straggling.

=== Foy's operations ===
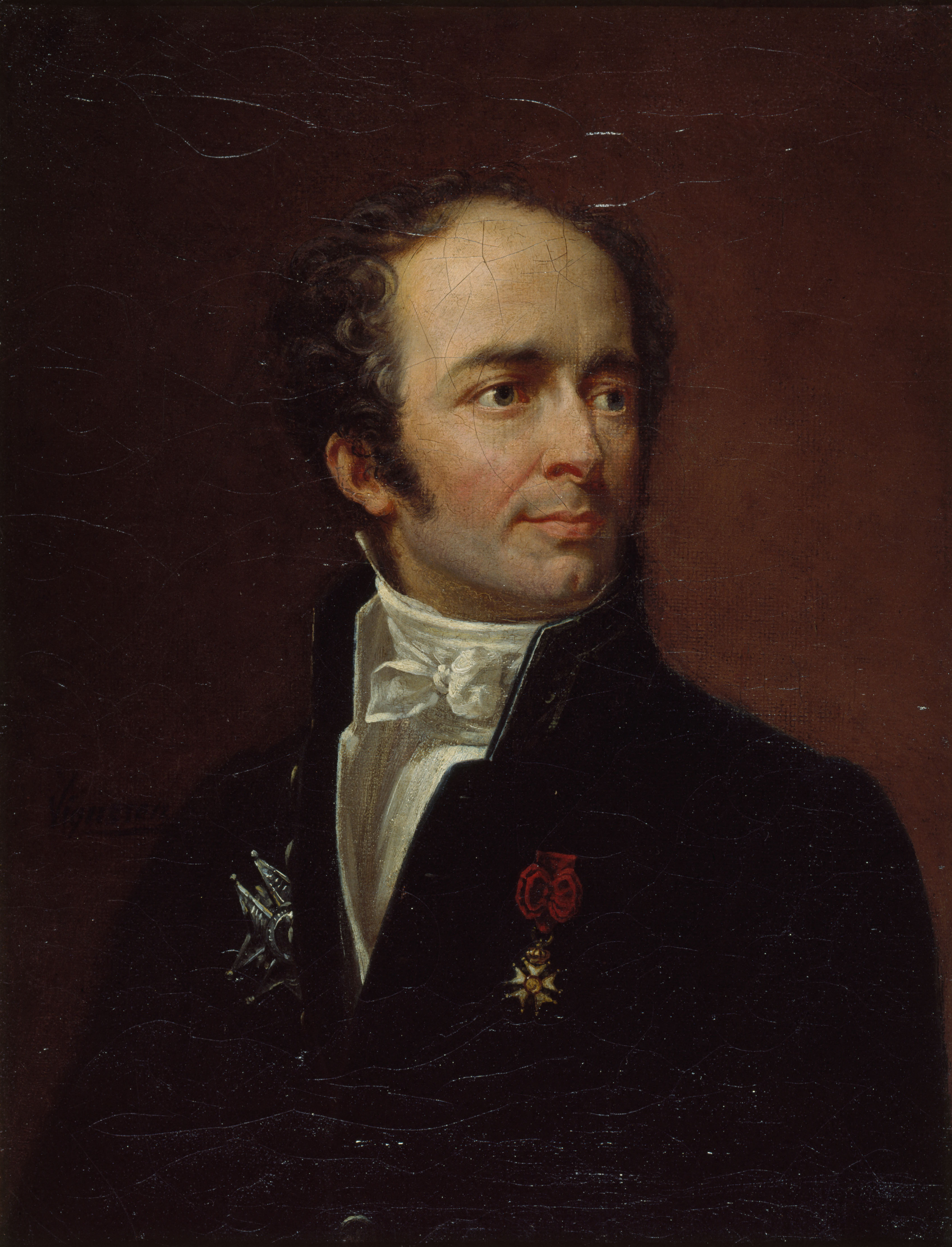
Maximilien Foy

On 21 April 1813, Foy's division (5,513 men) arrived at Bilbao in Vizcaya in northern Spain and was soon joined by Jacques Thomas Sarrut's division (4,500). Foy controlled over 16,000 men, counting Giuseppe Federico Palombini's Italian division (2,474), Pierre Gabriel Aussenac's brigade (1,500), Claude Pierre Rouget's brigade (2,000) and 409 artillerists. Clausel ordered Foy to capture the port of Castro Urdiales. In October 1812, Foy's 1st Division of the Army of Portugal was made up of two battalions each of the 39th, 69th and 76th Line Infantry Regiments and one battalion of the 6th Light Infantry. Jacques Thomas Sarrut's 4th Division of the same army included two battalions each of the 2nd and 4th Light and the 36th Line Infantry Regiments. Aussenac's brigade comprised two battalions each of the 3rd and 105th Line and one battalion each of the 64th, 100th and 103rd Line. Palombini's division consisted of two battalions each of the 4th and 6th Italian Line, three battalions of the 2nd Italian Light, the Napoleone Dragoons and two artillery batteries.

On 25 April 1813, Foy left Bilbao with his own, Sarrut's and Palombini's divisions, altogether over 11,000 troops, and reached Castro Urdiales that evening. The port was defended by 1,000 Spanish soldiers under Pedro Alvarez and supported by three British sloops, Lyra (10), Royalist (18) and Sparrow (16). The French took several days to bring up heavy cannons, but once they opened fire, the town walls were quickly breached. On the night of 11 May, the French stormed the town. While many of the attackers indulged themselves in rape and looting, the British ships successfully evacuated most of the garrison. Both sides lost about 180 casualties. On 30 May, Foy cornered a battalion of Spanish irregulars, killing 200 and capturing 360. Two other guerilla forces were caught but they managed to slip away with minor losses.

When Foy finally received instructions on 19 June, he was at Bergara with only one battalion, though there were 20,000 Franco-Italian troops scattered across his area of operations. By this time Sarrut's division had returned to Joseph's main army. The orders, which came via Pierre Thouvenot at Vitoria stated, "If General Foy and his division are in your neighborhood, you are to bid him give up his march on Bilbao, and draw in towards Vitoria, unless his presence is absolutely necessary at the point where he may be at present". Not appreciating the dire strategic situation, Foy declined to join the main army and his 5,000-man division was missed at Vitoria.

== Battle ==
=== Actions 22–25 June ===
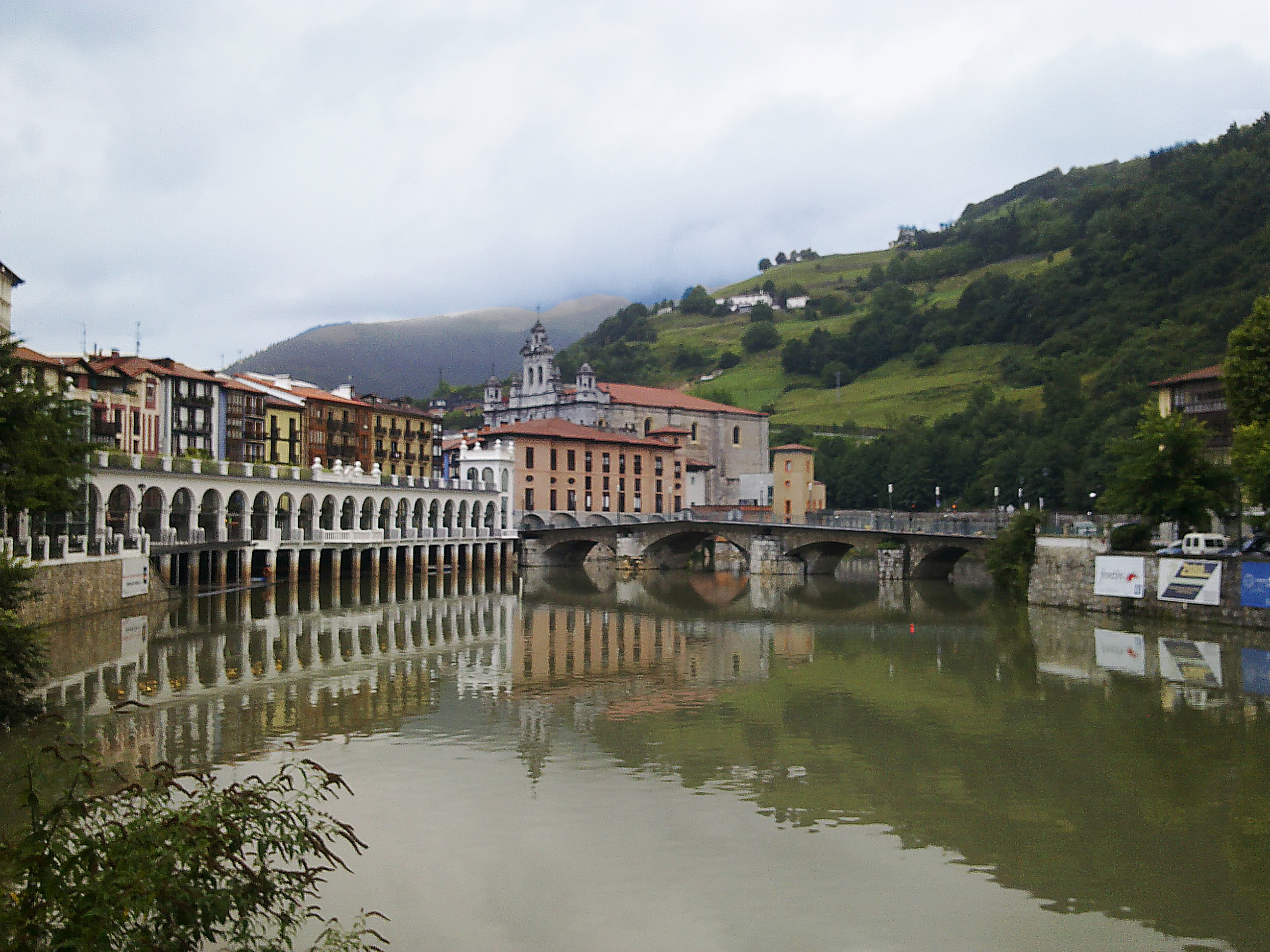
Tolosa lies in the deep valley of the Oria River.

On 20 June Foy issued orders to evacuate Bilbao. On 21 June, the day of battle, Maucune's division set off at dawn from Vitoria, escorting a large convoy toward the French frontier. That evening Maucune told Foy at Bergara that he had heard the sound of cannon fire behind him. The next day, refugees appeared, telling of a disaster and warning that Allied troops were in pursuit. Longa's division left Vitoria at dawn on 22 June. Girón's tired troops left Vitoria in the afternoon but were soon halted when Clausel was discovered to the south. With only two battalions, Foy was able to slow Longa's advance at the cost of about 200 casualties. By 23 June, Foy collected about 3,000 soldiers at Bergara and with these he confronted Longa's division while waiting for the garrison of Bilbao and Vertigier Saint Paul's Italian brigade to reach him. The Army of Galicia arrived at noon, but since the soldiers were in a state of exhaustion, Girón planned to attack Foy the following day. As soon as the missing French units reached Bergara in the afternoon, Foy marched east to Villareal de Álava.

Both Girón's Spanish Army of Galicia and Graham's column were told off to intercept the retreat of Foy's forces. However, poor staff work and heavy rains delayed the advance of Graham's column. The King's German Legion (KGL) light infantry brigade made good progress on 22 June, but the remainder of the British 1st Division and Thomas Bradford's Portuguese brigade lagged behind. Farther to the rear were Denis Pack's Portuguese brigade and George Anson's British cavalry brigade.

Anxious that Allied troops might use the road from Salvatierra to cut him off, Foy instructed Maucune to hold the road open until his 8,000 soldiers got past the danger point. Maucune sent the convoy ahead to Tolosa and turned back. He assigned one brigade to hold Villafranca de Ordicia and the second brigade to defend Beasain. Foy's column left Villareal de Álava in the predawn hours of 24 June with Saint Paul's brigade acting as the rearguard. Longa's troops caught up with the Italians but were unable to slow them down. Graham attacked Maucune with the soldiers he had available. Bradford's Portuguese were repulsed in their first attack on Villafranca but eventually pressed their opponents back. The KGL light battalions attacked and captured Beasain, but Maucune pulled back to high ground and continued to defy the Allies. Meanwhile, Foy's column crossed behind Maucune and got away toward Tolosa. On 24 June Maucune sustained 200 casualties and Graham lost 93, while the Italians and Longa's Spaniards each lost about 100 men.

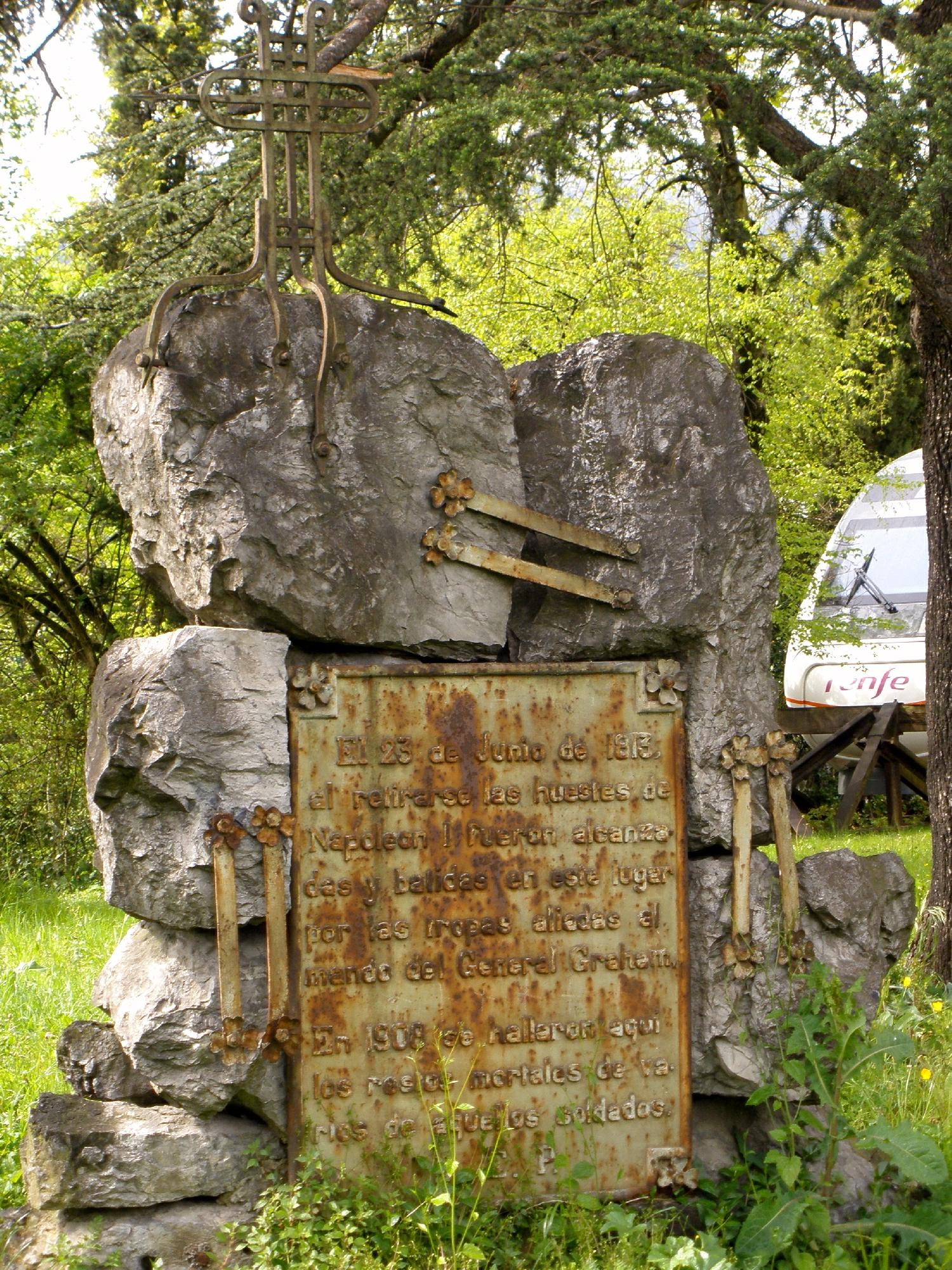
Memorial to French soldiers killed at Beasain.

Graham commanded about 26,000 men including 16,000 Spaniards and 10,000 British and Portuguese. There were 11,000 in Girón's two divisions, 3,000 Cantabrians under Longa and 2,500 Asturians under Juan Diaz Porlier. The 1st Division had 4,500, the brigades of Pack and Bradford had 4,500 combined and Anson had 650 horsemen. On 25 June his advance guard encountered Maucune's division at Alegia and pushed it out of the town. Believing incorrectly that Joseph's army might be retreating toward the Biscay coast, Foy determined to defend the town of Tolosa. He sent the convoy toward the frontier guarded by Pierre André Hercule Berlier's 4-battalion brigade.

Graham's 1st Division was led by Kenneth Alexander Howard and consisted of the Guards brigade under Edward Stopford and the KGL brigade under Colin Halkett. The Guards brigade included one company of the 60th Rifles and the 1st Battalions of the 2nd Foot Guards and 3rd Foot Guards Regiments. The KGL brigade was made up of the 1st and 2nd KGL Light and 1st, 2nd and 5th KGL Line Battalions. Pack's brigade comprised two battalions each of the 1st and 16th Portuguese Line Infantry Regiments and the 4th Caçadores Battalion. Bradford's brigade had two battalions each of the 13th and 24th Portuguese Line and the 5th Caçadores. Anson's brigade included the 12th and 16th Light Dragoons. Longa's division consisted of four battalions of the Iberia Light Infantry, two battalions of the Álava Regiment and one squadron of the Álava Hussars.

=== Action 26 June ===
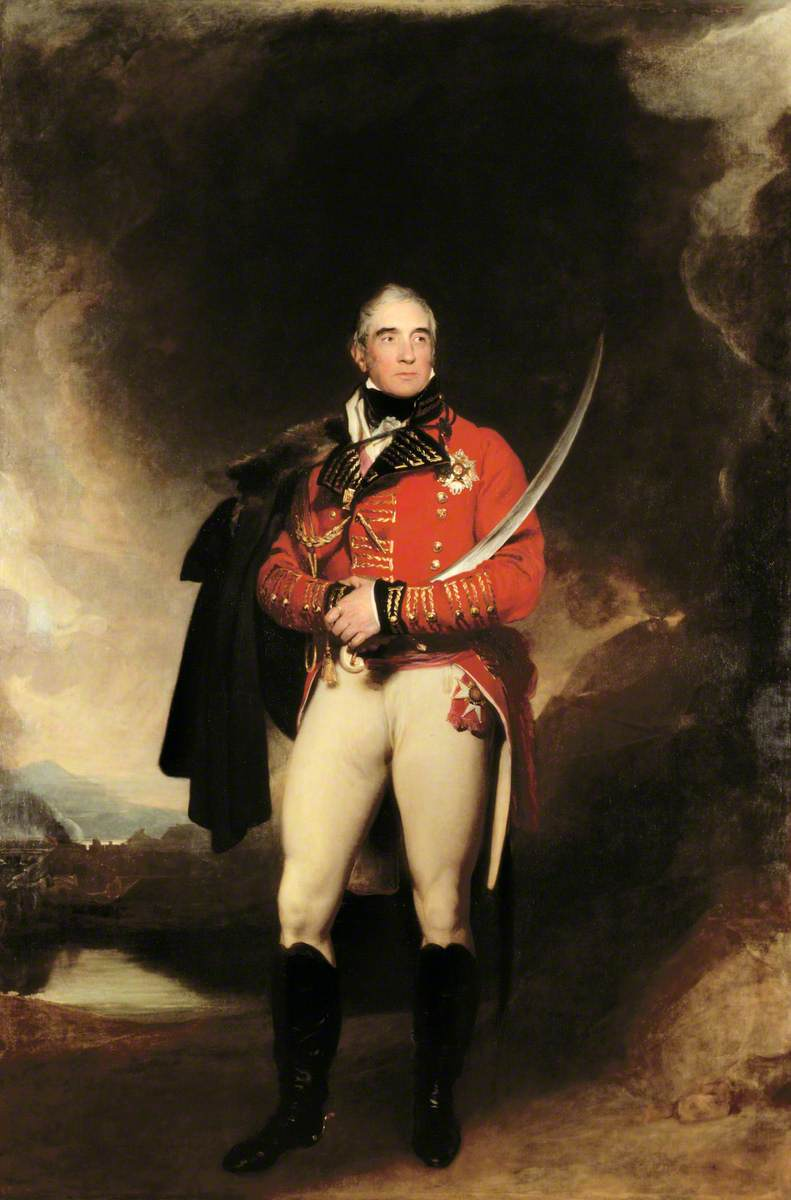
Thomas Graham

Foy commanded about 16,000 troops at Tolosa. These were Foy's division (3,000), Maucune's division (3,000), Saint Paul's Italians (1,500), Bilbao and Durango garrisons (3,000), Tolosa and nearby garrisons (2,500) and Vincent Martel Deconchy's Army of the North brigade (2,000). Maucune's 5th Division included two battalions each of the 15th, 66th, 82nd and 86th Line Infantry Regiments. Deconchy's brigade consisted of two battalions of the 64th Line Infantry, one battalion of the 22nd Line, four companies of the 34th Line and two companies of the 1st Light. Foy's 1st Division comprised the same units as it was in April. Saint Paul's brigade was made up of the same units as Palombini's division, but without the cavalry. The composition of Rouget's brigade was not stated.

The main highway to France runs to the northeast through Tolosa. The town lies in the Oria River valley and is surrounded by high hills. Since the town was on a main communication route, the French had buttressed Tolosa's ancient walls with blockhouses and protected the town gates with palisades. Foy placed Deconchy's brigade in Tolosa. Michel Louis Joseph Bonté's brigade and the Italians held a position southeast of town behind a stream. Foy's second brigade defended the hill of Jagoz, closer to the town. Rouget's brigade held the high ground on the west bank of the Oria. Maucune's division was on the main highway behind the town, in reserve. Foy's position was strong against an enemy attacking it along the highway. Any outflanking attempt would be time-consuming.

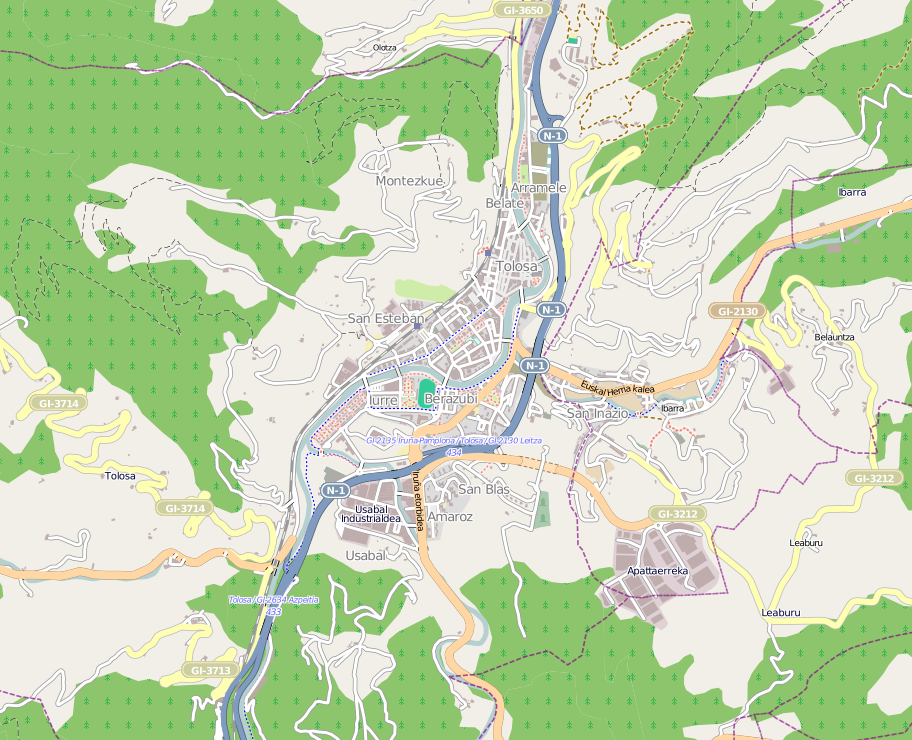
Modern map of Tolosa shows the town in the Oria valley surrounded by steep hills.

Graham saw that Foy's position must be outflanked. Directly facing the town on the main highway were the bulk of the 1st Division, followed by Pack's brigade and Girón's divisions. Longa and Porlier were sent on a wide sweep to the right via the villages of Altzo and Gaztelu to cut the road to Pamplona, which emerges from the east side of Tolosa. Bradford's brigade, supported by the KGL line infantry from 1st Division, was sent on a shorter hook to the right. One of Pack's battalions and the light infantry from Girón's 3rd Division were sent on a sweep to the left in order to attack the west side of town. Graham also asked Gabriel de Mendizábal Iraeta and his Vizcayan guerillas to move east from Azpeitia and block the main highway north of Tolosa. The Allied center would wait until the flank attacks were well underway.

Bradford's attack against Bonté's brigade, which was led by elements of the 4th Caçadores loaned from Pack's brigade, was able to quickly gain a foothold across the stream. Foy later blamed Bonté for not keeping a good watch and for disobeying orders. Bonté's first counterattack failed to eliminate the foothold so he threw in the Italian brigade as well. Bradford's attack stalled; according to Graham, the Portuguese brigade did not fight well after its opening assault. On the left, the Spanish-Portuguese column was blocked by a sheer cliff face. Late in the afternoon, Graham heard the far-away sounds of musketry from Longa's division on the right and Mendizábal's guerillas on the left. The British commander ordered the three KGL line infantry battalions on the right-center to attack, while the two KGL light infantry battalions assaulted Tolosa, supported by the Guards brigade and Girón's 3rd Division.

Led by its commander Christian Friedrich Wilhelm von Ompteda, the 1st KGL Light Battalion tried to storm the Vitoria gate on the south side of town. They were stopped by intense musket fire and fell back into a nearby convent. Again, Ompteda led his soldiers forward but fire from the walls and crossfire from the blockhouses repulsed the second charge. The battalion sustained losses of 63 killed and wounded in the abortive assaults. The French soldiers under Bonté and Saint Paul were hit in the left flank by the KGL line battalions and pushed back against the Pamplona gate on the east side of town. Unable to enter Tolosa because the gate was blocked by fortifications, the French and Italians broke out of the trap and streamed to the north along the base of the town wall. The pursuing KGL line battalions attacked the Pamplona gate and suffered a repulse.

On the west side of town Mendizábal's guerillas grappled with Rouget's brigade. The Spanish-Portuguese troops that had been blocked by the cliff dashed past the town walls on the west and struck Rouget's flank. Some French conscript battalions panicked and retreated, but Rouget managed to rally his brigade. Seeing his defenses collapsing, Foy instructed Deconchy's brigade to pull out of Tolosa. The order was delivered just in time. Cannons blasted open the Vitoria gate and the KGL light battalions swarmed into the town. After a few scuffles in the town, Deconchy's brigade got out with small loss. The flanking forces of Mendizábal and Longa caught some stragglers, but Foy's corps marched off rapidly as darkness fell.

== Results ==
Graham reported 58 killed, 316 wounded and 45 missing among the Anglo-Portuguese soldiers. One authority estimated Spanish casualties as 200. Foy admitted sustaining 400 casualties, which may be low because the Allies claimed to have made 200 prisoners. The brigades under Bonté and Rouget suffered the most. That night Foy's force bivouacked at Andoain where he was met by the 62nd Line Infantry, a pro-French Spanish regiment and Berlier's brigade (40th and 101st Line Infantry). The next day, Foy's corps, which numbered 16,000 infantry, 400 cavalry and 10 field pieces, retreated to Hernani. Berlier, who had shepherded the convoy to safety, was sent to look for Joseph's army and found Reille's force at Bera (Vera).

Louis Emmanuel Rey was appointed to defend San Sebastián on 19 June and that port's defenses were badly neglected. The only troops available to hold the city were 500 gendarmes, an unreliable conscript battalion and some sappers. In addition there were 7,000 French and Spanish refugees clogging the city. When Foy arrived on 28 June he immediately assigned Deconchy's troops and a number of artillerists to garrison the place. (Deconchy himself was assigned to lead a different brigade.) The gendarmes and conscripts were used to escort the refugees to Spain. When Foy retreated across the Bidasoa River at the frontier, Rey had a garrison of 3,000 soldiers. At this point Foy passed under the orders of his army commander Reille. By the 29 June Mendizábal's guerillas started the siege by cutting off all communications with San Sebastián. The first actions of the Battle of the Pyrenees began on 25 July.
