= Francisco Javier Losada =

Spanish army officer (1777–1847)

- Born: 23 October 1777; Pontevedra, Galicia, Spain
- Died: 9 January 1847 (aged 69) Madrid
- Conflicts: Napoleonic Wars; Peninsular War; Battle of Zornoza; Battle of Valmaseda; Battle of Espinosa de los Monteros; Battle of Villafranca; Battle of Tamames; Battle of Alba de Tormes; Battle of Carpio; Battle of San Marcial; Battle of Tordesillas; Hundred Days

Francisco Javier Losada y Pardo de Figueroa (1777–1847), 8th Count of Maceda, 6th Count of San Román, was a Spanish military commander.

== Early career ==
Losada joined the Provincial Regiment of Santiago as a captain in 1797. Shortly after the start of the war against England in 1805, he was promoted to colonel of the Provincial Regiment of Compostela and was garrisoned at La Coruña until the outbreak of the Peninsular War.

== Peninsular War (1807–1814) ==
In June 1808 the Junta de Galicia promoted him to brigadier and he was given command of the La Coruña Volunteers Regiment, which saw action Zornoza, Balmaseda y Espinosa de los Monteros, before withdrawing to León and Galicia.

In 1809 he fought at Villafranca (18 March) and was given command of the 1st Division of the Army of the Left the following month. After fighting at Lugo, he was promoted to field marshal that July.

Serving under the orders of the Duque del Parque, Losada fought at Tamames, Alba de Tormes and Medina del Campo. In May 1810, Losada was commissioned to oversee the training of the regiments being sent to Galicia.

In July 1810 Losada was appointed second-in-command of the region of Asturias, where he saw combat against Bonet's forces on several occasions. On 18 March 1811 his troops were defeated at Puelo.

In Summer 1811, Losada commanded the 1st Division (Asturians) of Santocildes's 6th Army.

In June 1812, General Castaños named Losada commander of the Reserve Division of Santocildes's 6th Army.

He then participated in the siege and surrender of Tamames, Alba de Tormes and Medina del Campo. During the withdrawal from that defeat, he distinguished himself at Villamuriel.

As part of the reorganisation of the 4th Army, he was given command of its 3rd Division, which saw action at Tolosa, Irún, and San Marcial (31 August 1813), where he was wounded.

== Post-war career ==
During the Hundred Days, Losada served in the Observation Corps of Navarra and Guipúzcoa, under Enrique O'Donnell, until September 1815, when he was given command of the 3rd Division of Ballesteros's Army of the Reserve, after having been promoted to lieutenant general the previous May.

In 1820, as governor of Santiago, he fought against the liberals, having to flee Galicia when the Constitution was proclaimed.

In 1823, Fernando VII appointed Losada inspector general of the Militias and commander-in-chief of the Provincial Royal Guard, post he held until 1836, when he was dismissed following the 1836 La Granja Mutiny.

In 1840 he supported General Espartero's pronunciamiento.
