= Martín de la Carrera =

Spanish army officer (18th century – 1812)

- Born: 18th century Málaga, Spain
- Died: 26 January 1812; Murcia
- Military career
- Branch: Cavalry
- Conflicts: War of the Pyrenees; Peninsular War; Battle of Puente Sanpayo; Battle of Tamames; Battle of Alba de Tormes; Battle of Albuera

Martín de la Carrera (18th century – 1812) was a Spanish military commander.

== Early career ==
A captain during the War of the Pyrenees, he was badly wounded by a bullet to the chest.

As a colonel, in 1808 la Carrera was transferred to the Guardia Real, and sent with La Romana's expeditionary force to Denmark, where he was attached to the King's Cavalry Regiment.

== Peninsular War ==
Once back in Spain, in mid-October 1808, La Romana gave orders for raising a guerrilla cavalry corps, to be commanded by his brother, Field Marshal Juan Caro, with la Carrera as second-in-command, and with which they were active in Asturias and León.

In early March 1809, leaving some 2,000 men under General la Carrera at Puebla de Sanabria, General la Romana departed to strike back into Galicia with 6,000 infantry. Marching on Villafranca, he forced the French garrison there to surrender after a fierce battle.

Towards the end of May, la Carrera left a small detachment of 200 men at Sanabria and marched up to Santiago de Compostela with 1,500 men, 70 horse, and nine guns to form the core of the Division of the Minho, the newly raised insurrectionary army that Morillo and Garcia del Barrio had been training and, as commander-in-chief of this division, would defeat Maucune's four battalions and a regiment of chasseurs at the Combat at Campo de Estrella (Compostela) on 22 May.

Shortly thereafter he handed over his command of the División del Miño to the newly appointed second-in-command of the captaincy general of Galicia, Count Noroña, and they went on to defeat Marshal Soult at the Battle of Puente Sanpayo. For his services at these two battles la Carrera was promoted to field marshal.

His cavalry division was later incorporated into General Mahy's army, withdrawing first to Astorga and then towards Salamanca.

At the battles of Tamames (October 1809) and Alba de Tormes (November 1809), la Carrera led General Duke del Parque's Vanguard Division, the morning state of which, on 20 November, a week before Alba de Tormes, was 363 officers and 7,050 men, plus one battery of field artillery.

In 1810 he saw action in Extremadura, leading a relief party into Ciudad Rodrigo and capturing Cáceres.

En 1811, still in Extremadura, la Carrera fought at the Battle of Albuera, before moving down into Andalusia and then Murcia. In September he was given the command of the Cavalry of Mahy's re-organised 3rd Army.

La Carrera was killed in action at Murcia.
