= El Carpio, Valladolid =

Village in Valladolid, Castile-Leon, Spain

Coordinates: 41°13′N 5°06′W

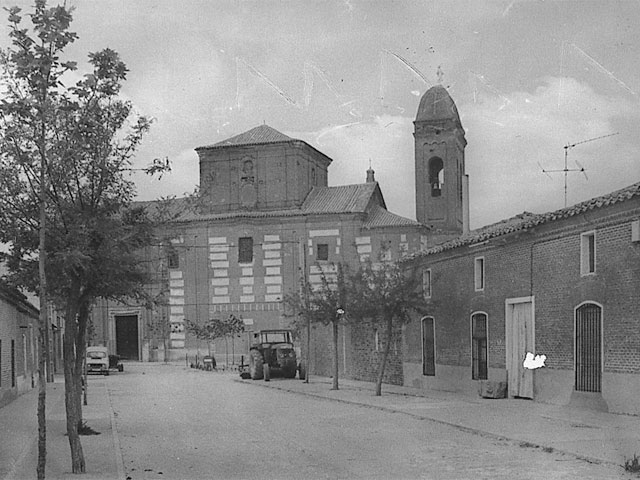

Flag of El Carpio, Valladolid

Coat of arms of El Carpio, Valladolid

El Carpio is a village in the province of Valladolid, Castile-Leon, Spain, some 20 km southwest of the town of Medina del Campo.

The municipality covers an area of 56.83 square kilometres (21.94 sq mi) and as of 2011 had a population of 1103 people.

== History ==
During the Peninsular War, El Carpio was the site of the Duke del Parque's Spanish victory over General Kellermann's French troops at the Battle of Carpio (1809). At the southwestern tip of the province of Valladolid, bordering the province of Salamanca, the village, including its church and strategic 10th century fortress, once of great strategic importance, as it separated the kingdoms of Castilla and León, was completely destroyed by the French troops on 25 November 1809.

== See also ==
- Battle of Carpio
- Cuisine of the province of Valladolid
