= Battle of Gamonal =

1808 Battle during the Peninsular War

- Part of the Peninsular War
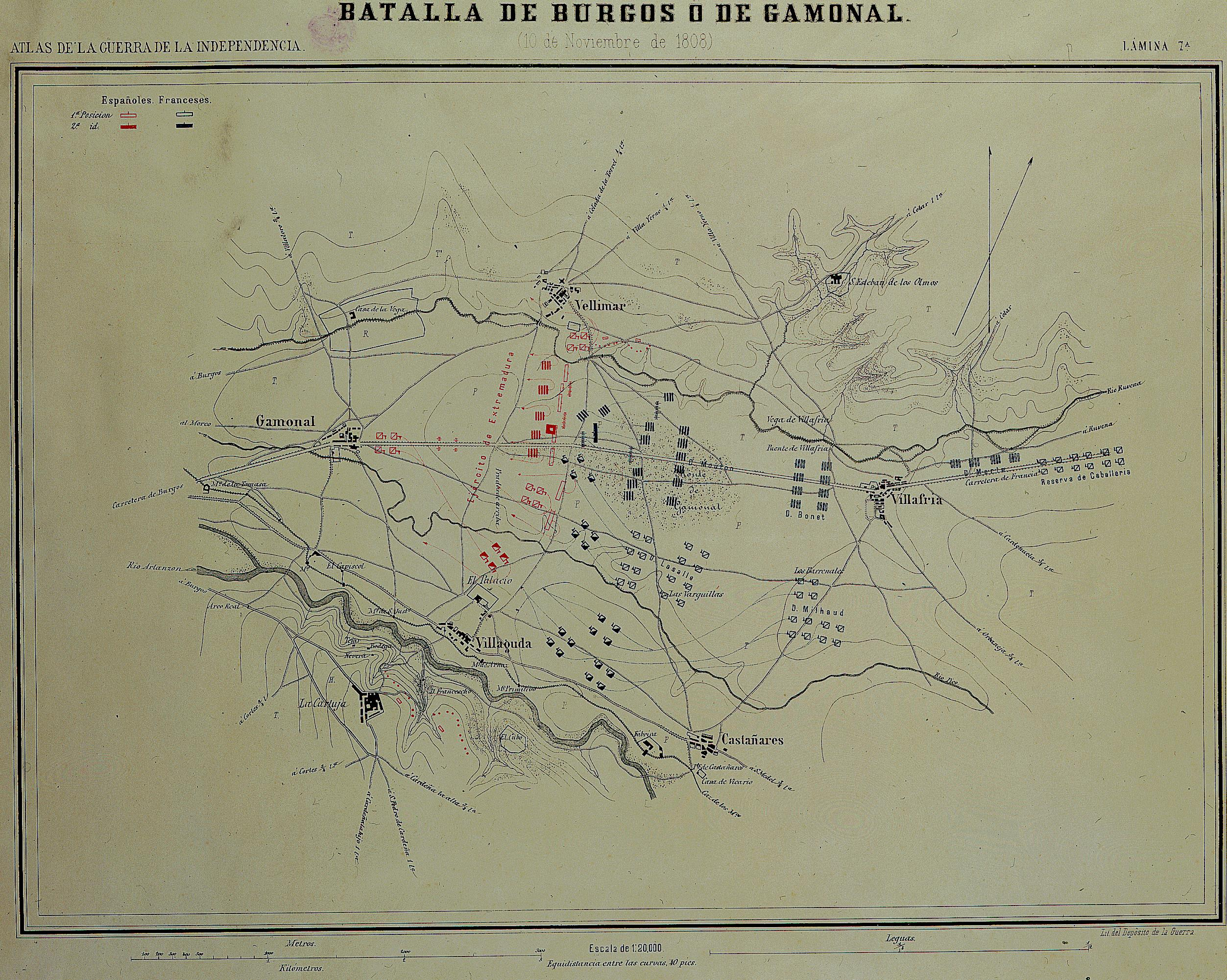
- "Battle of Burgos or Gamonal" (Atlas de la Guerra de la Independencia (National Library of Spain)
Date	10 November 1808
Location	Gamonal, near Burgos, Spain 42.3558°N 3.6681°W
Result	French victory

Belligerents
(First French Empire) French Empire	Spain

Commanders and leaders
Marshal Soult	Conde de Belvedere

Strength
18,000 infantry 6,500 cavalry	9,800 infantry 1,200 cavalry

Casualties and losses
200	3,400

Peninsular War: Napoleon's invasion
current battle

The Battle of Gamonal (also known, in Spanish, as the Battle of Burgos) was fought on 10 November 1808, during the Peninsular War in the village of Gamonal near Burgos, Spain. A French army under Soult overwhelmed the outnumbered Spanish troops under General Belvedere, opening central Spain, including Madrid, to invasion.

== Background ==
Napoleon, staying for four days at Vitoria on his way down to Madrid, had been waiting, among other things, for the news that Bessières had occupied Burgos. Bessières himself, already aware that he was to be superseded by Soult, had not yet advanced on that city. Although his forces numbered some 70,000 men, of which nearly 20,000 were veteran cavalry from Germany, only the 18,000 bayonets and 6,500 sabres of his 2nd Corps and the cavalry of Milhaud and Franceschi were on the front line.

Facing them at Burgos were its garrison of 1,600 men, and four guns. However, on 7 November, Conde de Belvedere arrived from Madrid with his 1st Division (4,000 foot and 400 horse with twelve guns) of the army of Estremadura, and the following day they were joined by the 2nd Division of the same army, with about 3,000 infantry and two regiments of hussars. On the 10th, therefore, when Soult attacked, Belvedere—who took the command as the senior general present (Note: "... the conduct of the army fell into the hands of the Conde de Belvedere, the chief of the 1st Division, a rash and headstrong young aristocrat with no military experience whatever. His family influence had made him a general at an age when he might reasonably have expected to lead a company, and he found himself by chance the interim commander of an army: hence came the astonishing series of blunders that led to the combat of Gamonal (Oman, 1902).)—had about 8,600 bayonets, 1,100 sabres, and sixteen guns under his orders.

== Battle ==
The French attacked the Spanish positions before Burgos with a ratio 2:1. The two divisions of the Army of Extremadura were arrayed on the open plain at Gamonal and, broken by a massive cavalry charge, fled in panic, leaving the invaders to sack Burgos.

According to Oman (Oman, 1902), if Belvedere had attempted a stand at Burgos, he would have been able to take advantage of that city's ancient fortifications, as well as the broken ground around it: "But with the most cheerful disregard of common military precautions, the Count marched out of Burgos, advanced a few miles, and drew up his army across the high-road in front of the village of Gamonal. He was in an open plain, his right flank ill covered by the river Arlanzon, which was fordable in many places, his left completely 'in the air', near the village of Vellimar".

In front of the line was a large wood, which the road bisects and which gave the French troops ideal cover for hiding their movements until the last moment. Belvedere had stationed his two batteries on the centre, with six battalions in the first line, and with a cavalry regiment on each flank. The second line was formed of four battalions; two more battalions, the four guns, and his third cavalry regiment were coming up from the rear, but had not yet taken their post in the second line when the short and sudden battle was fought and lost.

Soult arrived with Lasalle's light-cavalry division deployed in his front, followed by Milhaud's dragoons and three infantry divisions of the 2nd Corps—Mouton in front, then Merle, with Bonnet bringing up the rear.

Milhaud's division of dragoons rode southward and formed up on the banks of the river, facing the Spanish right, while Lasalle's four regiments of light cavalry composed the French centre. Mouton's twelve battalions deployed on the left and advanced through the wood, preceded by tirailleurs.

The seven regiments of cavalry which formed the left and centre of the French army delivered a devastating charge at the Spanish infantry in the plain and the regiment of Spanish hussars covering their flank was "swept away like chaff before the wind". The infantry were still in line and did not have time to form squares before 5,000 horsemen swept over them, riding over five battalions, taking all their colours, killing half of them or taking them prisoner. The remnant fled towards Burgos, with Milhaud's dragoons in pursuit, while Lasalle's chasseurs fell upon the surviving half of Belvedere's army. At the same moment Mouton's infantry attacked them from the front. The result was a complete rout and all sixteen Spanish guns were captured, including those of the second line that had not even been unlimbered, let alone fired a single shot.

Although Belvedere himself made two attempts to rally his troops, one at the bridge, and the other outside the city itself, he was unable to stop them fleeing.

The only troops that held their line were, to the south, the 4th Battalion of the Walloon Guard, under Colonel Vicente Genaro de Quesada, and to the north, Lieutenant-colonel Juan Díaz Porlier's 1st Regiment of Provincial Grenadiers, which managed to withstand the onslaught and retreat in order.

== Aftermath ==
On entering the city of Burgos, the French army celebrated their victory by sacking it and even the house next to that in which Napoleon had taken up his quarters for the night was pillaged and set on fire, so that he had to shift into another street.

Napoleon's invasion of Spain proceeded with the Battle of Espinosa de los Monteros.

The Spanish defeats at Gamonal and Espinosa de los Monteros led to the dispersion of some 20,000 regular troops throughout Cantabria, Castilla-León, Navarra, País Vasco and Rioja, many of whom would form guerrilla bands to fight against the French.

This was, specifically, the case of Juan Díaz Porlier who, with his regular troops, would be active in the north of the country and whose division of 6,450 troops, made up of five infantry regiments and one of hussars, would, by early 1811, form the vanguard of the 33,230-strong 7th Army, which brought together five divisions of guerillas (Díaz Porlier's Cantabrian Division, Longa's Iberian Division, Renovales's Basque Division, Espoz y Mina's Navarran Division and Merino's Castilian Division.

== See also ==
- Timeline of the Peninsular War

== Bibliography ==
- Bodart, Gaston (1908). Militär-historisches Kriegs-Lexikon (1618-1905).
- Esdaile, Charles J. (2003). The Peninsular War. Palgrave MacMillan. ISBN 978-1-4039-6231-7.
- Porlier, Juan Díaz (2007). "El Marquesito". Archived from the original on 12 March 2007.

Preceded by Battle of Valmaseda	Napoleonic Wars; Battle of Burgos	Succeeded by Battle of Espinosa de los Monteros
