= Battle of Carpio =

1809 battle during the Peninsular War

- Part of the Peninsular War
Date	23 November 1809
Location	El Carpio, Valladolid, near Medina del Campo, Spain 41°13′N 5°6′W
Result	Spanish victory

Belligerents
(First French Empire) French Empire	Kingdom of Spain

Commanders and leaders
(First French Empire) François Étienne de Kellermann	(Spain) Duke del Parque

Strength
11,700	19,000

Casualties and losses
1,100 dead or wounded	60 dead and 88 wounded

Peninsular War: Castile & Andalusia 1809–1810

The Battle of Carpio or Battle of El Carpio took place at El Carpio, near Medina del Campo, Valladolid, on 23 November 1809, between a Spanish force of 19,000 men commanded by the Lieutenant-General Diego de Cañas y Portocarrero, Duke del Parque and a French force of 10,000 regulars and 1,700 cavalry under the General François Étienne de Kellermann during the Peninsular War. The French forces were defeated and forced to leave the town. In this struggle, died two distinguished Spanish leaders, Salvador de Molina and Colonel Juan Drimgold.

== Background ==
The Spanish campaign in late 1809 had started with the Battle of Talavera.

Del Parque led the northern army in a two pronged offensive against Madrid. He enjoyed some success at first, pushing back Marchand and the VI Corps at Tamames. Then the southern army met disaster at the Battle of Ocaña. Historian David Gates wrote,

Marchand again left Salamanca to the enemy and fell back to the Douro, uniting with Kellermann's colonne mobile - which had hastened to his assistance - at Medina del Campo. After fighting a cursory engagement there, however, Del Parque learnt of the Ocaña débâcle and, realising that Joseph's forces were now free to concentrate against him, went into immediate retreat for the sanctuary of the sierras.

== Aftermath ==
The Spanish campaign in late 1809 proceeded with the second Madrid offensive in the Battle of Alba de Tormes, where Kellermann and Marchand caught up with Del Parque on 26 November 1809 and inflicted a stinging defeat on the Spanish army.
