= Antoine Louis Popon de Maucune =

French general (1772-1824)

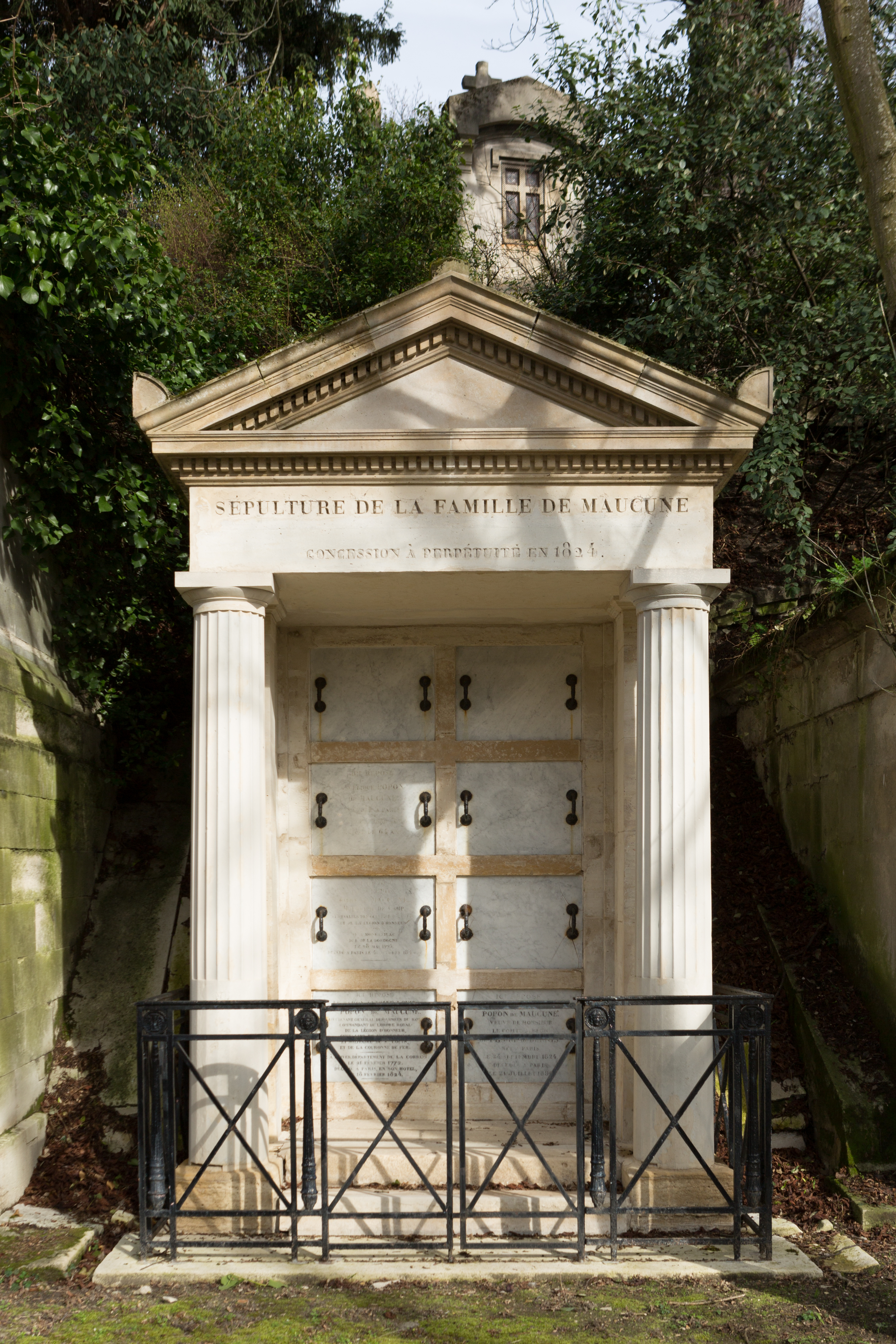
- Born: 21 February 1772; Brive, Limousin, France
- Died: 18 February 1824 (aged 51)
- Allegiance: France
- Branch: Sappers, Infantry
- Service years: 1786–1818
- Rank: General of Division
- Conflicts: War of the First Coalition; Battle of Arcole; War of the Second Coalition; Battle of Trebbia; Battle of Novi; Battle of Genola; War of the Third Coalition; Battle of Elchingen; War of the Fourth Coalition; Battle of Jena; Action of Soldau; Battle of Eylau; Battle of Friedland; Peninsular War; Battle of Tamames; Battle of Alba de Tormes; Siege of Ciudad Rodrigo; Siege of Almeida; Battle of Bussaco; Battle of Casal Novo; Battle of Fuentes de Oñoro; Battle of Salamanca; Battle of San Millan-Osma; Battle of Tolosa; Battle of Sorauren; Battle of the Bidassoa; War of the Sixth Coalition; Battle of the Taro
- Awards: Légion d'Honneur; Order of Saint Louis

Antoine Louis Popon de Maucune (French pronunciation: [ɑ̃twan lwi pɔpɔ̃ də mokyn]; 21 February 1772 – 18 February 1824) led a French division against the British in 1811–1813 during the Peninsular War. He is referred to as Maucune in English-language sources. He joined the pioneer corps of the French army in 1786 and was a lieutenant by the time the French Revolutionary Wars broke out. He fought in the north in 1792 and in the Alps in 1793. Afterward he served in Italy through 1801. During this period, he fought at Arcole in 1796 and at Trebbia, Novi and Genola in 1799. He was appointed to command the 39th Line Infantry Demi-Brigade and led it in the 1800 campaign.

During the Napoleonic Wars Maucune led the 39th in Marshal Michel Ney's VI Corps at Elchingen in the 1805 campaign and at Jena, Magdeburg, Soldau, and Eylau in the 1806–1807 campaign. Promoted to general officer, he led a brigade at Friedland in 1807. In Spain from 1808 and 1811, he commanded a brigade at Gallegos, Tamames, Alba de Tormes, Ciudad Rodrigo, Almeida, Bussaco, Casal Novo, and Fuentes de Oñoro.

In May 1811, the army was reorganized and Maucune was promoted to lead a division. This started a period of remarkable bad luck. At Salamanca in July 1812, his isolated division was wrecked by a combination of British infantry and cavalry attacks led by Lieutenant-General Stapleton Cotton, (later Viscount Combermere). In June 1813, the British surprised his troops at San Millán de la Cogolla. The division missed the Battle of Vitoria, since he was carrying part of the immense collection of art looted in Spain, but helped fight off the Allied pursuit at Tolosa. His division was scattered at Sorauren in late July 1813 and at the Bidassoa in October. After these defeats, Marshal Jean-de-Dieu Soult replaced him with Jean François Leval. Sent to Italy, he was defeated at the Taro River in April 1814 while defending against three-to-one odds. Maucune is one of the names inscribed under the Arc de Triomphe on Column 35.

== Career ==
Maucune was adjutant to General of Division François Watrin at the Battle of Trebbia. On the second day of battle, 19 June 1799, he personally led some troops in an attack along the south bank of the Po River.
