= Guerilla (wargame) =

Board wargame

Front cover of rulebook

Guerilla is a board wargame published by Maplay Games in 1974 that provides a tactical simulation of guerilla combat on Borneo during the Indonesia–Malaysia confrontation of the early 1960s.

== Background ==
In 1962, Indonesia objected to the creation of the Federation of Malaysia, and an undeclared guerilla war broke out between the two countries.

== Description ==
Guerilla is a two-player game at the tactical level in which one player controls Gurkha forces fighting for Malaysia, while the other player controls Indonesian forces.

=== Components ===
The game includes:

- 25" x 29" paper hex grid map scaled at 1.2 km (0.75 mi) per hex
- 555 (uncut) paper counters
- 18-page typewritten rules booklet
- Ground Effects card
- small six-sided die

=== Gameplay ===
In addition to the usual rules for movement and combat, there are also provisions for secret victory conditions, ambushes, infiltration, hidden guerilla units, canoes, helicopters and the construction of helipads in villages.

== Publication history ==
Guerilla was published by the British games company Maplay Games in 1974, packaged in an envelope. The designer and rulebook cover artist are uncredited. Maplay went on to publish one more game in 1976, a Napoleonic wargame titled Salamanca, before it went out of business.

== Reception ==
In Issue 23 of Moves (Oct-Nov 1975), Richard Berg commented, "Of more than usual interest is Maplay's Guerrilla, another game published in England. A tactical-level game that seems to be more operational than anything, this simulation of the guerrilla warfare in Indonesia in the '60's is a great deal of fun with its surprise attacks, helicopters and canoes and unknown victory conditions." Berg concluded, "A gruelling game for both players, Guerrilla is the quintessential 'amateur' game: good, playable and flavorful, with that touch of individuality that is so often lacking from the larger companies."

In the 1977 book The Comprehensive Guide to Board Wargaming, game critic Charles Vasey complimented "A large map and neat counters." He concluded, "Great attention to detail, but supply rules [are] odd; movement uses a rather old-fashioned method."

In Issue 11 of Simulacrum, Joe Scolari noted the unusual and possibly unique setting, saying, "Games like Guerilla are a breath of fresh air for wargamers tired of endlessly recycled topics like Gettysburg, D-Day and the Bulge." Scolari pointed out that in 1974, Guerilla's small platoon-sized combats "had few peers when published since there were only a handful of games at that time using squad level units." He admitted the components were not well-produced but thought the game was still good, saying, "While Guerilla is rough around the edges (including some amateur production values), the design itself shows quite a bit of creativity. This is especially true in comparison to its squad level contemporaries. Even today it is possibly (albeit by default) the definitive tactical treatment of the conflict."
