= Battle of Tamames =

1809 battle of the Peninsular War

- Part of the Peninsular War
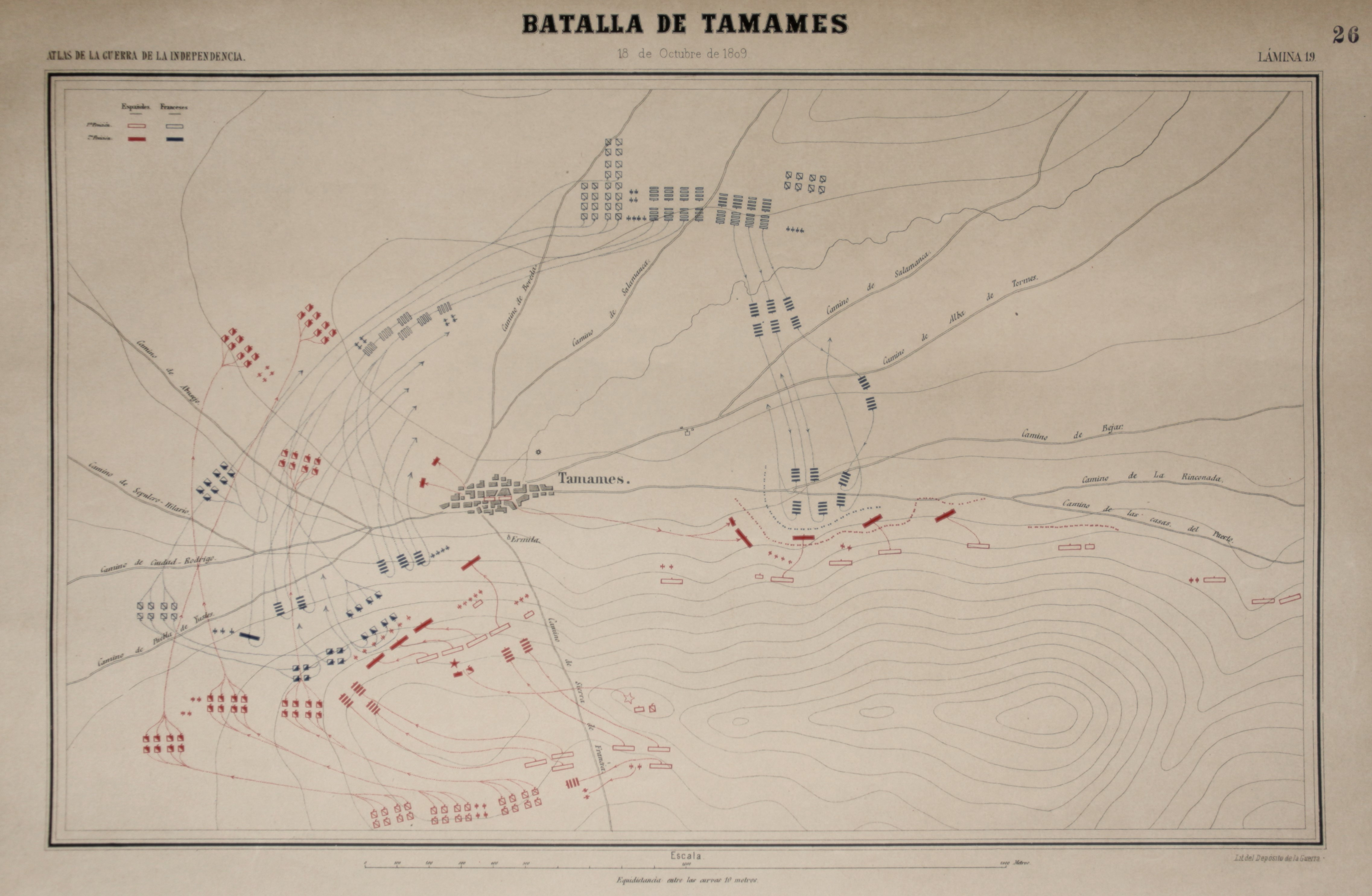
- Spanish map of the battle (1868)
Date	18 October 1809
Location	Tamames, near Salamanca, Spain 40.66°N 6.10°W
Result	Spanish victory

Belligerents
(France) French Empire	Spain

Commanders and leaders
(First French Empire) Jean Marchand	(Spain) Duke del Parque

Strength
11,000	21,000

Casualties and losses
1,300–1,400 killed or wounded	700–713 killed or wounded 1 gun lost

Peninsular War: Castile & Andalusia
current battle

The Battle of Tamames was lost by part of Marshal Michel Ney's French army under General of Division Jean Marchand in the Peninsular War. The French, advancing out of Salamanca, were met and defeated in battle by a Spanish army on 18 October 1809.

== Background ==
The Spanish campaign in late 1809 started with the Battle of Talavera.

== Battle ==
The Spanish drew their forces in a defensive line on a low ridge above the village of Tamames. Despite being on defensive ground, the battle opened badly for the Spaniards under General del Parque, who resorted to severe measures to restore discipline. The Spanish cavalry was routed early on, but fire from del Parque's own infantry quickly brought their retreat to grief and directed them back into the fight. Spanish artillery positions similarly fell to the French but were retaken at bayonet point by del Parque's infantry.

The French attacked in massed columns but never in enough strength to dislodge the Spanish. The difficult ground meant that the French cavalry could not be deployed effectively.

Immediate French losses amounted to about 1,200 killed or wounded on the battlefield. A pursuit by the Spanish cavalry increased these losses twofold; the Spaniards captured the French colours and a 12-pounder.

== Forces ==
The VI Corps under Marchand consisted of his own 1st Division (three battalions each of 6th Light, 39th, 69th and 76th Line), General of Division Maurice Mathieu's 2nd Division (three battalions each of 25th Light, 27th and 59th Line, and one battalion 50th Line), Brigadier general Jean Lorcet's Corps cavalry brigade (3rd Hussars, 15th Chasseurs, 15th and 25th Dragoons). There were about 9,000 infantry, 2,000 cavalry and 30 cannon.

Del Parque's army included Major general Martin de la Carrera's Vanguard, Maj-Gen Francisco Xavier Losada's 1st Division, Major general Conde de Belvedere's 2nd Division, Major general Francisco Ballasteros's 3rd Division, Major general Marquis de Castrofuerte's 5th Division and the Prince of Anglona's Cavalry Division. Altogether there were about 20,000 infantry, 1,400 cavalry and 30 artillery pieces.

The French lost 1,300 killed, wounded and captured. There were 23 officers killed and 55 wounded, including Lorcet. Del Parque's army suffered 713 killed and wounded and one gun captured.

== Strategic picture ==
Del Parque begged the Duke of Wellington to join him in an attempt to overrun Leon and Old Castile. However, the British general refused. Wellington had found the Spanish completely uncooperative during the campaign which culminated in the Battle of Talavera and his subsequent retreat to Portugal. Marchand would avenge his defeat at the Battle of Alba de Tormes in November.

== Aftermath ==
The Spanish campaign in late 1809 proceeded with the second Madrid offensive in the Battle of Ocaña.

== Notes ==
Preceded by Battle of Almonacid	Napoleonic Wars; Battle of Tamames	Succeeded by Battle of Ocaña
