= Tiebas-Muruarte de Reta =

Town and municipality in Navarre, Spain

Coordinates: 42°41′35″N 1°38′25″W

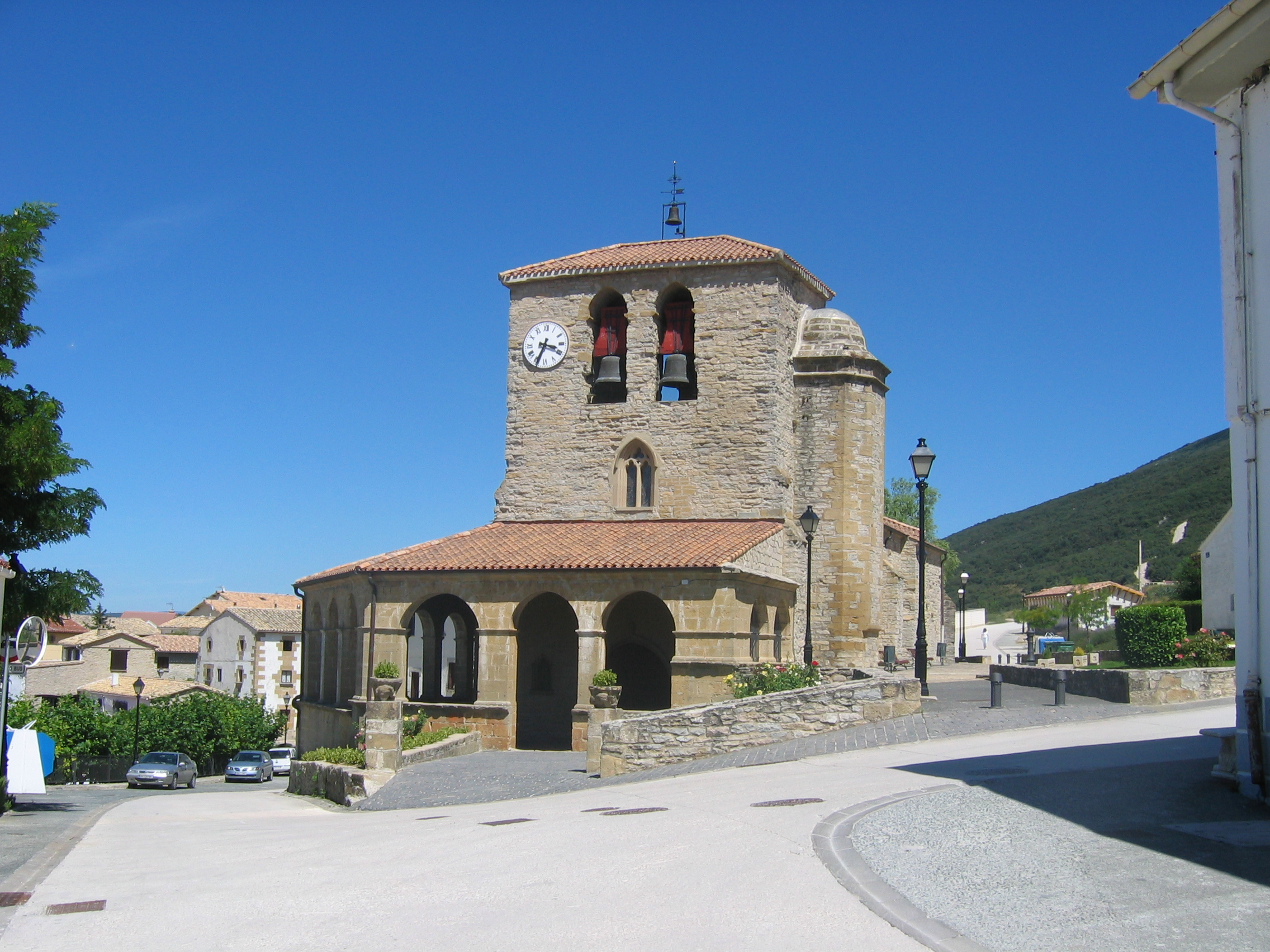
Church of Santa Eufemia in Tiebas

Tiebas-Muruarte de Reta (Basque: Tebas-Muru Artederreta) is a town and municipality in the province and autonomous community of Navarre, northern Spain.
