= Conde de Belvedere =

Spanish military officer

Ramón Patiño, Count of Belvedere (in Spanish, conde de Belveder) was a Spanish military commander during the Peninsular War.

Charles Oman (Oman, 1902) referred to Belvedere as "... a rash and headstrong young aristocrat with no military experience whatever. His family influence had made him a general at an age when he might reasonably have expected to lead a company, and he found himself by chance the interim commander of an army: hence came the astonishing series of blunders that led to the combat of Gamonal".

== Peninsular War ==
=== Battle of Gamonal ===
On 10 November 1808, with 8,600 bayonets, 1,100 sabres, and sixteen guns of the 1st and 2nd Divisions and the garrison at Burgos under his orders, as interim commander of the Army of Extremadura, Belvedere was heavily defeated by Soult's far superior forces at Gamonal, on the outskirts of Burgos.

Marching from Madrid, Belvedere had arrived at Burgos on 7 November, to strengthen its garrison of 1,600 men, and four guns, and the following day they were joined by the 2nd Division of the same army, with about 3,000 infantry and two regiments of hussars. Belvedere took the command as the senior general present. (Note: "... the conduct of the army fell into the hands of the Conde de Belvedere, the chief of the 1st Division, a rash and headstrong young aristocrat with no military experience whatever. His family influence had made him a general at an age when he might reasonably have expected to lead a company, and he found himself by chance the interim commander of an army: hence came the astonishing series of blunders that led to the combat of Gamonal (Oman, 1902).)

At Gamonal, he lined up his troops against a far larger number of French units whose seven regiments of cavalry delivered a devastating charge at the Spanish infantry in the plain and the regiment of Spanish hussars covering their flank was "swept away like chaff before the wind" and the attack was over before the Spaniards could form squares or even unlimber some of their cannon.

Although Belvedere himself made two attempts to rally his troops, one at the bridge, and the other outside the city itself, he was unable to stop them fleeing.

According to Oman (Oman, 1902), if Belvedere had attempted an initial stand at Burgos, he would have been able to take advantage of that city's ancient fortifications, as well as the broken ground around it: "But with the most cheerful disregard of common military precautions, the Count marched out of Burgos, advanced a few miles, and drew up his army across the high-road in front of the village of Gamonal. He was in an open plain, his right flank ill covered by the river Arlanzón, which was fordable in many places, his left completely 'in the air', near the village of Vellimar".

=== Later actions ===
Following the rout at Gamonal, Belvedere retreated to Lerma, and from there to Aranda de Duero before finally reaching Segovia, where the Junta Central relieved him of his command, appointing José Heredia y Velarde to take his place.

His 2nd Division was later incorporated into the Duque del Parque's Army of the Left, with which he fought at Tamames (October 1809), as the 3rd Division (Reserve) and, the following month, at Alba de Tormes, as the 2nd Division, with 6,415 men and 344 officers under his command. In November 1809, his 2nd Division formed the reserve of Del Parque's Army of Castile.

In 1812, he commanded the 2nd Division of the 6th Army, taking over from Taboada in July.
