= Battle of San Millan-Osma =

1813 battles during the Peninsular War

Battles of San Millán and Osma
- Part of Peninsular War
Date	18 June 1813
Location	San Millán de San Zadornil, Burgos, Spain; Osma, Álava, Basque Country, Spain 42.85°N 3.14°W
Result	Allied victory

Belligerents
(France) French Empire	United Kingdom; Portugal; Spain

Commanders and leaders
(France) Joseph Bonaparte (France) Antoine Maucune (France) Jacques Sarrut	(United Kingdom) Marquess Wellington (United Kingdom) Charles Alten (United Kingdom) Kenneth Howard

Strength
San Millan: 4,800; Osma: 3,800–4,802	San Millan: 4,000–5,484; Osma: 1,200–4,854

Casualties and losses
San Millan: 400; Osma: 120	San Millan: 100; Osma: 50–60

Peninsular War
Vitoria and the Pyrenees, 1813–1814
current battle

In the Battles of San Millán and Osma (18 June 1813) two divisions of the Allied army of Arthur Wellesley, Marquess of Wellington clashed with two divisions of King Joseph Bonaparte's Imperial French army in northeast Spain. "extremely punishing couple of miniature battles at Osma and San Millan which ruined Maucune's division and sent the Army of … There were in fact two armies involved in the campaign of 1813" "Contact was, however, inevitable and on 18 June there was a sharp fight at the small village of San Millan, when the Light … The French tried to make a stand at Osma the same day, but this was effortlessly beaten back and with it went …"

At San Millán de San Zadornil, Charles Alten's Light Division mauled over Antoine Louis Popon de Maucune's French division. At Osma, 7.4 kilometres (4.6 mi) to the northeast, Jacques Thomas Sarrut's French division fought an inconclusive skirmish with Kenneth Howard's division before withdrawing to the southeast. San Millán de San Zadornil is located in the Province of Burgos while Osma is in Álava, Basque Country. The actions occurred during the Peninsular War, part of the wider Napoleonic Wars.

In the summer of 1813, Wellington's army thrust into Spain from Portugal with a powerful army composed of British, Portuguese, and Spanish soldiers. The British general outmaneuvered his opponents and forced the French to abandon Salamanca, Valladolid, Madrid, and Burgos. King Joseph and Marshal Jean-Baptiste Jourdan believed their position behind the Ebro River was secure, but Wellington sent his troops marching to outflank the line on the north. As Sarrut moved north, his troops bumped into Howard's soldiers. Maucune's division at San Millán was suddenly attacked from the west by Alten. Believing Maucune's division was no longer fit for combat, Joseph used it to escort a convoy and it missed the decisive Battle of Vitoria three days later.

== Background ==
After the campaign in the fall of 1812, Arthur Wellesley, Marquess of Wellington's army was in poor shape, with 18,000 soldiers on the sick list. On the other hand, the campaign resulted in the capture of the cities of Ciudad Rodrigo, Badajoz, Astorga, and Seville, and the provinces of Andalusia, Asturias, and Extremadura. Also, 5,000 new replacements came out from Great Britain.

The winter of 1812 also witnessed the destruction of Emperor Napoleon's army during the French invasion of Russia. In order to rebuild his army in Germany, Napoleon demanded reinforcements of 15,000 men from King Joseph Bonaparte's army and 5,000 men from Marshal Louis Gabriel Suchet's army in eastern Spain. To Joseph's relief, Marshal Jean-de-Dieu Soult was also recalled to join Napoleon and was replaced by Marshal Jean-Baptiste Jourdan. The various withdrawals left Joseph in control of 95,000 troops in three armies. These were the 42,000-man Army of Portugal under Honoré Charles Reille, the 36,000-strong Army of the South led by Honoré Théodore Maxime Gazan de la Peyrière and the 17,000-man Army of the Center directed by Jean-Baptiste Drouet, Comte d'Erlon.

Meanwhile, Joseph's forces reimposed control over northern and central Spain. However, guerrilla warfare in northern Spain soon spiralled out of control and Napoleon ordered Bertrand Clausel to replace Marie-Francois Auguste de Caffarelli du Falga as commander of the Army of the North. Obsessed with the Spanish partisans' disruption of communications with France, the emperor ordered the Army of Portugal's six divisions be made available to Clausel for anti-guerrilla operations.

With heavy reinforcements from the Army of Portugal, Clausel set about trying to suppress the Navarrese partisans. On 30 March 1813, the French general suffered a setback when guerrilla chief Francisco Espoz y Mina ambushed a French column. While two battalions were busily plundering Lerín, Mina surprised them with 2,100 guerillas, including 200 lancers. Out of 1,500 French soldiers, only a handful escaped the disaster and 663 were made prisoner. Marie Étienne de Barbot, commander of the 2nd Division of the Army of Portugal, was nearby with six battalions but failed to succor his ambushed column.

On 12 May 1813, Clausel found and destroyed Mina's encampment in the Roncal Valley, inflicting 1,000 casualties on the guerillas. On the same day, Maximilien Sebastien Foy recaptured Castro Urdiales on the Bay of Biscay. Foy commanded his own 1st Division and Jacques Thomas Sarrut's 4th Division, both of the Army of Portugal, and Giuseppe Federico Palombini's Italian Division from the Army of the Center. The Franco-Italians lost 150 killed and wounded out of 10,000 men and 18 siege guns. Colonel Pedro Alvarez's 1,000 Spanish soldiers suffered losses of 160 killed and wounded. Before being evacuated by the Royal Navy, Alvarez's men detonated the powder magazines and threw their cannons into the bay. While Clausel and Foy were employed hunting down guerillas, critical events were occurring elsewhere in Spain.

== Allied offensive ==
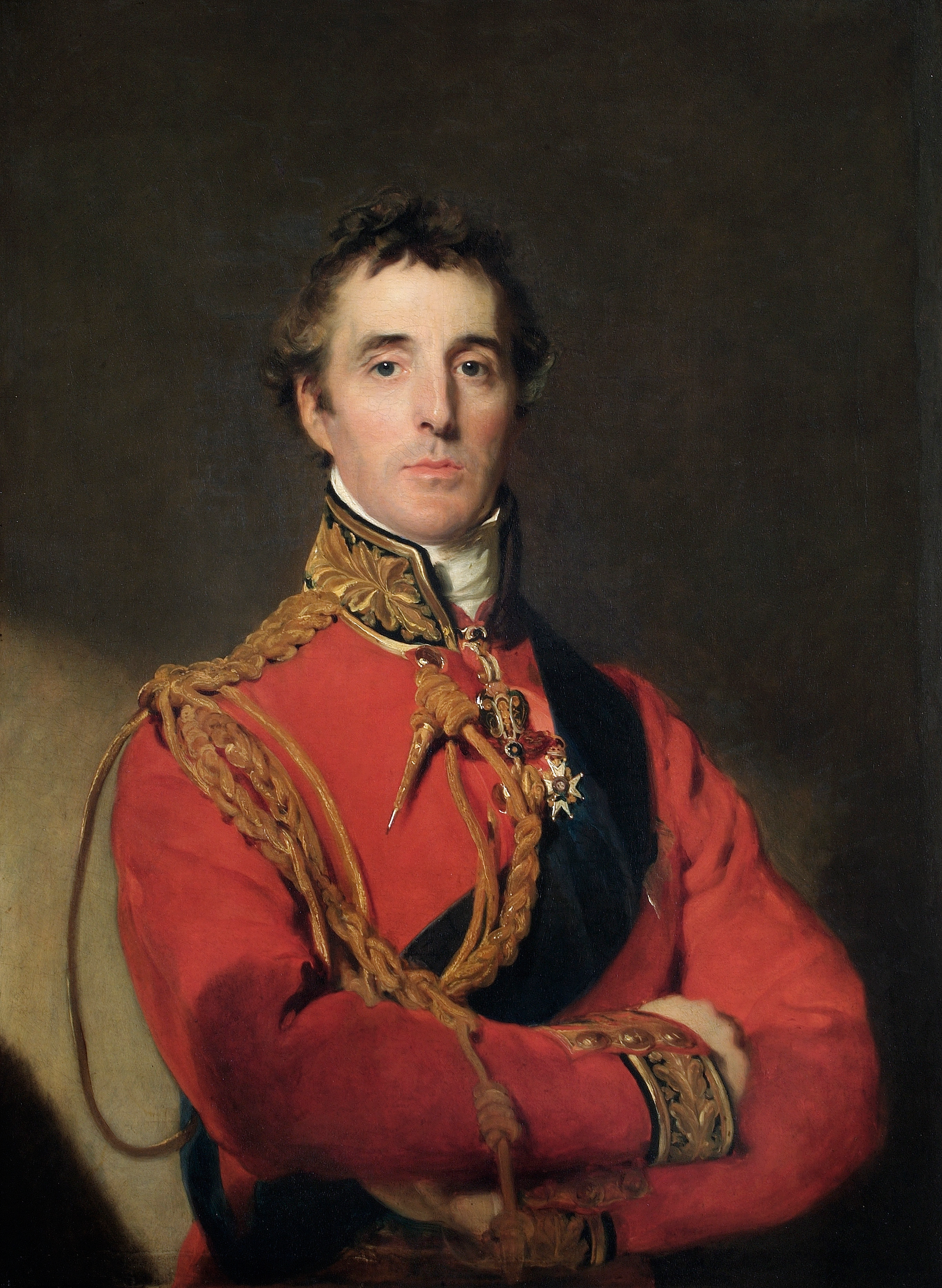
Lord Wellington

After the various subtractions of strength, Joseph had only 33,000 infantry, 9,000 cavalry, and 100 guns to face Wellington. Napoleon assured his brother Joseph that the British general was too cautious to take advantage of the situation, and in any case could only deploy 30,000 British and 20,000 Portuguese soldiers. In fact, Wellington was on the march with 52,000 British, 28,000 Portuguese, and 25,000 Spanish troops. The three-division right wing under Rowland Hill was ordered to advance northeast to Salamanca while the six-division left wing led by Thomas Graham crossed to the north bank of the Douro River inside Portugal.

Joseph and Jourdan posted Gazan's Army of the South and d'Erlon's Army of the Center to cover Valladolid and Segovia, while Reille with the remaining 17,000 troops from the Army of Portugal was sent to the north to help suppress guerillas. At this time, Clausel's 20,000 soldiers were located near Pamplona, far to the east. Hill's wing seized Salamanca on 26 May 1813, chasing Eugene-Casimir Villatte's French troops out of the city and capturing 200 French soldiers. Meanwhile, Graham's soldiers forded the flooding Esla River at Almendra on 31 May, losing some men to drowning and much equipment. Augustin Darricau, whose division held Zamora, had sent a cavalry reconnaissance to the west on 20 May that reported no enemy activity. The French horsemen just missed Graham, who crossed the Douro soon afterward. Finally alerted that 64,000 men were bearing down on Zamora from the northwest, Darricau bolted to the east, leaving Graham to occupy the town on the morning of 2 June.

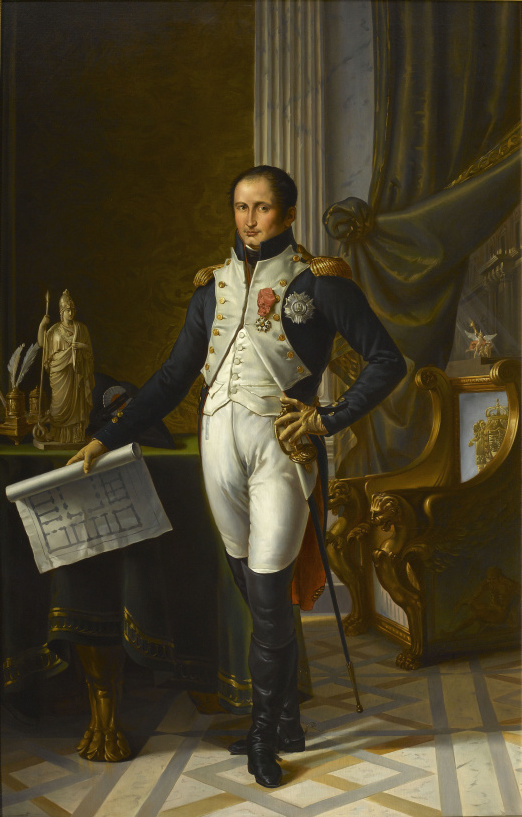
Joseph Bonaparte

The same day, Colquhoun Grant's cavalry brigade consisting of the 10th, 15th, and 18th Hussar Regiments defeated a French cavalry force at Morales de Toro. The French mounted troops comprised the 16th and 21st Dragoon Regiments under Pierre Benoît Soult and their horses were in very bad condition. The 16th was virtually destroyed, with two officers and 308 troopers being made prisoners; of these 100 were wounded. British casualties in the clash were only 16 killed and wounded. On 3 June, Hill's wing joined Graham on the north bank of the Douro at Toro. At this time, Wellington had 90,000 troops concentrated while the French could only count 51,000 men. Alarmed at the odds against them, Joseph and Jourdan sent a frantic message to Clausel asking for help and withdrew toward Burgos.

Joseph and Jourdan expected Wellington to advance along the great road from Valladolid to Burgos. Instead, the British general directed Hill and the right wing to advance just to the north of the road. Graham and the left wing were farther to the north. To Graham's left marched a Spanish corps led by Pedro Agustín Girón with 12,000 men. The French fell back behind the Pisuerga River and then to Burgos but, to their bewilderment only a handful of Spanish cavalry directly pursued them. Wellington's great flank march continued and the French abandoned Burgos on 13 June, blowing up the castle that had been the focus of the Siege of Burgos the previous autumn. Unsuspected by the French, the British commander was prepared to change his base from Lisbon to Santander on the Bay of Biscay.

During the French retreat, Reille turned up with three divisions of the Army of Portugal, adding 15,000 men to Joseph's army. Clausel's 25,000 troops were at large but Joseph had no idea where they were. For his part, Clausel never received any messages from the king until 15 June, at which time he gathered four divisions and set out to join the main army. Joseph massed his army behind the Ebro River, believing that it would be impossible for Wellington's army to outflank the line on the north. On 15 June, Hill's wing crossed the Ebro at Puente Arenas and Graham's wing crossed at San Martin de Lines. From the 13th until a cavalry encounter on 17 June, the French lost all contact with their adversaries.

== Osma ==
Joseph found out that Girón's column was menacing Bilbao so he directed Reille to move north with three divisions on 18 June. Reille soon ran afoul of Graham's wing of the Allied army. Graham had with him the 1st Division, 5th Division, George Anson's Light Dragoon Brigade, and Thomas Bradford's Independent Portuguese Brigade. On the 18th, Sarrut's 4th Division of the Army of Portugal blundered into Kenneth Howard's 1st Division at Osma. Sarrut's force included two battalions each of the 2nd Light, 4th Light, and 36th Line Infantry Regiments, about 3,800 men. The French encountered the 1st and 2nd Light King's German Legion (KGL) Battalions of Colin Halkett's brigade, about 1,200 troops. In the clash, the French suffered 120 killed and wounded while the KGL units lost between 50 and 60 casualties. Reille retreated south to link up with Joseph's army at Miranda de Ebro.

Sarrut's division was organized into two brigades under Joseph François Fririon and Jean Baptiste Pierre Menne plus an artillery battery. It had a total strength of 146 officers and 4,656 rank and file. Fririon's brigade was made up of the 2nd Light and the 36th Line while Menne's brigade had the 4th Light and the 65th Line. Howard's division comprised the 1,728-man 1st Brigade under Edward Stopford and the 3,126-strong 2nd Brigade under Halkett. Stopford commanded one company of the 5th Battalion of the 60th Foot, and the 1st Battalions of the 2nd Foot Guards and the 3rd Foot Guards. Halkett's all-KGL brigade included the 1st Light, 2nd Light, 1st Line, 2nd Line, and 5th Line Battalions.

== San Millan ==
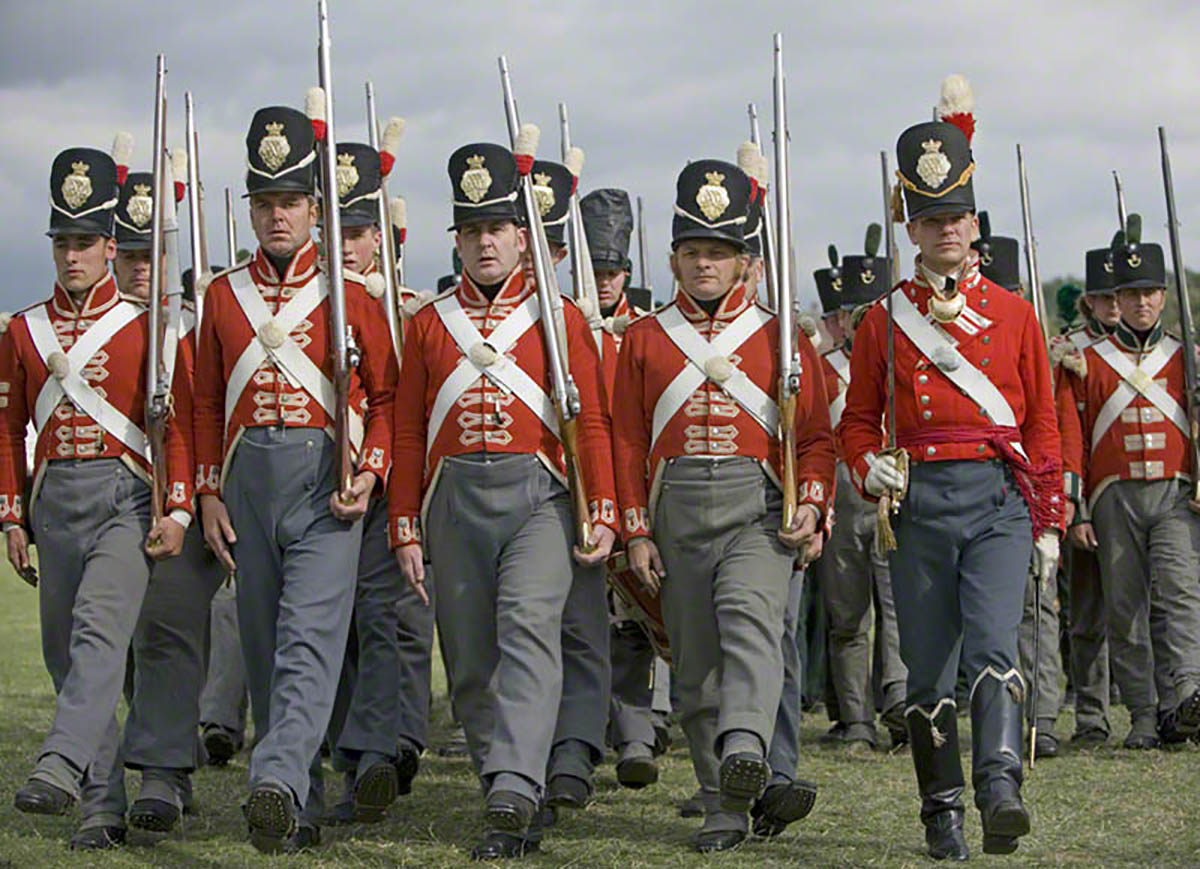
Re-enactors dressed as British soldiers

On 18 June 1813, Antoine Louis Popon de Maucune's 5th Division of the Army of Portugal counted 4,800 men. The division included two battalions each of the 15th, 66th, 82nd, and 86th Line Infantry Regiments. That day, one of the brigades was halted at the village of San Millán de San Zadornil. The leading brigade of the Light Division under John Ormsby Vandeleur marched up from the west and attacked. As Vandeleur's men pushed the French from the village and east along the road, Maucune's second brigade appeared from a rocky gorge to the southwest. The second brigade was in the right rear of Vandeleur's brigade, but before the French could take advantage of the situation, James Kempt's brigade arrived on the scene. Kempt immediately attacked and, to avoid being taken in flank and rear, Maucune's second brigade left the road and began to retreat across the hillsides. Noticing what was going on behind him, Vandeleur pulled the 1st Battalion of the 52nd Foot out of line and turned it against the French second brigade. Under the pressure, Maucune's second brigade collapsed and the men ran away.

The Light Division was commanded by Charles Alten and consisted of Kempt's 1st Brigade and Vandeleur's 2nd Brigade. The 2,597-man 1st Brigade consisted of the 1st Battalion of the 43rd Foot, eight companies of the 1st Battalion of the 95th Rifles, five companies of the 3rd Battalion of the 95th Rifles, and the 3rd Portuguese Caçadores Battalion. The 2,887-strong 2nd Brigade was made up of the 1st Battalion of the 52nd Foot, six companies of the 2nd Battalion of the 95th Rifles, the 17th Portuguese Line Infantry Regiment, and the 1st Portuguese Caçadores Battalion. The Light Division had 5,484 officers and men, of whom 1,945 were Portuguese.

Maucune lost about 400 casualties. Of these, about 300 were captured along with the division's baggage train. British losses were about 100 killed and wounded. As the French soldiers fled, many threw away their knapsacks. The division reorganized at Miranda de Ebro. Joseph was furious with Maucune for allowing his division to be routed. The unit was so roughly handled that the king decided it was no longer fit for combat and assigned it to guard a convoy bound for France. The convoy set out from Vitoria at 2:00 AM on the morning of the 21st. The division would be sorely missed at the Battle of Vitoria later that day.
