= Tamames =

- Municipality
- Flag Coat of arms

- Location in Salamanca

- Location in Spain
- Coordinates: 40°39′25″N 6°06′15″W
- Country: Spain
- Autonomous community: Castile and León
- Province: Salamanca
- Comarca: Campo de Salamanca

Government
  - Mayor: Carlos Moises Navarro Oltra (Citizens)

Area
  - Total: 61 km^{2} (24 sq mi)
- Elevation: 898 m (2,946 ft)

Population (2025-01-01)
  - Total: 781
  - Density: 13/km^{2} (33/sq mi)
- Time zone: UTC+1 (CET)
  - Summer (DST): UTC+2 (CEST)
- Postal code: 37600
- Website: www.tamames.net

Tamames is a municipality located in the province of Salamanca, Castile and León, Spain. As of 2016 the municipality has a population of 826 inhabitants.
