= Diego Vicente Cañas Portocarrero, 7th Duke del Parque =

Spanish army officer (1755–1824)

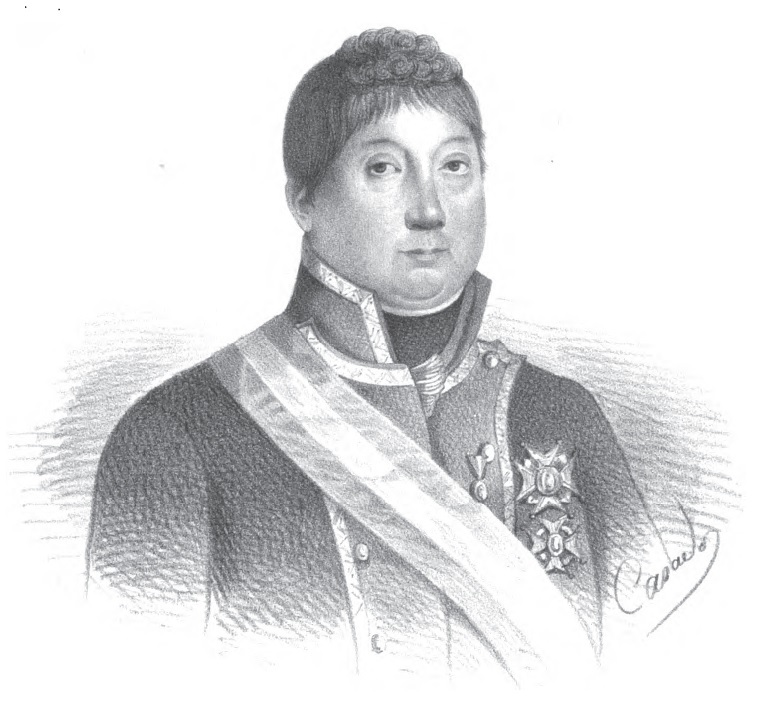
The Duke of Parque

Diego Vicente Cañas Portocarrero, 7th Duke Del Parque, (Note: However, the biography at the Real Academia de la Historia not only gives his name as Vicente María Cañas y Portocarrero, but also refers to him as 6th Duke (García Muñoz).) also known as Vicente María de Cañas y Portocarrero (1755 – 12 March 1824), was a lieutenant-general and a Spanish military commander during the Peninsular War.

== Early career ==
The Duke was a member of the inner circle supporting the Prince of Asturias against Godoy, as well as a member of the Cortes of Bayonne, a fervent supporter of Napoleón and Joseph I of Spain's government.

== Peninsular War ==
After the Madrid Uprising at the beginning of May 1808, the Duke issued a statement, Amados españoles, dignos compatriotas (Bayonne, 8 June 1808), in which he tried to halt the national uprising.

Following General Francisco Castaños's defeat of the French army at Bailen (July 1808), Del Parque changed sides and joined the patriotic fight against the French invasion.

In April 1809, he was appointed Captain-general of Old Castile and given the command of the Army of the Left, with which he fought at Tamames (October 1809), and, the following month, at Alba de Tormes, with 32,822 troops under arms, incorporated into divisions commanded by Major-Generals Martín de la Carrera (Vanguard Division), Francisco Xavier Losada (1st Division), Conde de Belveder (2nd Division), and Francisco Ballesteros (3rd Division), Brigadier-General Marquis de Castrofuerte (5th Division), and the Prince of Anglona (Cavalry Division).

In October 1809, the British ambassador to Spain, Richard Wellesley, tried to get Martín de Garay, secretary to the Supreme Central Junta and the person in charge of that body's international relations, to dismiss the Duke.

When, in February 1810, the command of the Army of the Left was returned to Marquis of La Romana, Del Parque was appointed governor of the Canary Islands.

In 1812, the Supreme Central Junta gave the Duke the command of the Army of Castile.

== Post-war career ==
In 1817 he was appointed ambassador in Paris, a posting he turned down.

In the 1820s, as a mason, where he was known "Franqulín", Del Parque would make known his liberal principles, becoming a member of societies of Exaltados ('Fanatics' or 'Extremists', in the sense of 'radicals'), the label given to the most left-wing or progressive political current of liberalism in nineteenth-century Spain, associated with, and at times inspired by, French Jacobinism and republicanism, including La Fontana de Oro, one of several sociedades patrióticas (societies of patriots), clubs at which liberal politics were open to discussion during the Trienio Liberal, and of which he would become chairman.

He went on to become, in 1822, a deputy for Valladolid, and, very briefly, president of Spain's Congreso de los Diputados (November 1822 to December 1822).

Following the invasion of the "Hundred Thousand Sons of Saint Louis" (1823), a French army mobilized by the Bourbon King of France, Louis XVIII, to help the Spanish Royalists restore King Ferdinand VII of Spain to the absolute power of which he had been deprived during the Liberal Triennium, the Duke went with the Cortes and the government to Seville and, from there, on to Cádiz.

As soon as he had regained the throne, Fernando VII ordered that the Duke be arrested and detained in a public prison. However, given his age and illness, the French garrison at Cadiz placed him under house arrest instead. He died shortly thereafter.
