= Battle of Salamanca order of battle =

Order of units at the Battle of Salamanca

The following units and commanders fought at the Battle of Salamanca on July 22, 1812, during the Peninsular War.

== Abbreviations used ==
=== Military rank ===
- Gen = General
- Lt Gen = Lieutenant-General
- Maj Gen = Major-General
- GD = général de division
- Brig Gen = Brigadier-General
- GB = général de brigade
- Col = Colonel
- Lt Col = Lieutenant Colonel
- Maj = Major
- Capt = Captain
- Lt = Lieutenant

=== Other ===
- (w) = wounded
- (mw) = mortally wounded
- (k) = killed in action
- (c) = captured

== Allied Army ==
Commander-in-Chief of the Allied Army: Lt Gen the Earl of Wellington (local General)

Commander-in-Chief of the Portuguese Army: Marshal William C. Beresford (w)

Lt Col William H. De Lancey, Deputy Quartermaster-General (acting as Quartermaster-General)

Lt Col Sir John May, Adjutant-General (Royal Artillery) (w)

Lt Col R. Lawrence Dundas

Lt Col Henry Sturgeon

Lt Col John Waters

Maj George Scovell

Mr. John Bisset, Commissary-General

Dr. James McGrigor, Surgeon-General

Brig Gen Don Miguel R. de Álava y Esquivel, Spanish Liaison officer

Brig Gen Don Joseph O'Lawlor, Spanish Liaison officer

Division	Brigade	Regiments and Others
First Division; Maj Gen Henry Campbell	Fermor's Brigade Col Thomas W. Fermor	1st Battalion, Coldstream Guards; 1st Battalion, 3rd Guards; 5th Battalion, 60th Foot (1 company)
First Division; Maj Gen Henry Campbell	Wheatley's Brigade Maj Gen William Wheatley	2nd Battalion, 24th Foot; 1st Battalion, 42nd Foot; 2nd Battalion, 58th Foot; 1st Battalion, 79th Foot; 5th Battalion, 60th Foot (1 company)
First Division; Maj Gen Henry Campbell	Lowe's Brigade Maj Gen Baron Lowe (or von Löw)	1st Line Battalion, King's German Legion; 2nd Line Battalion, King's German Legion; 5th Line Battalion, King's German Legion
Third Division; Maj Gen Edward Pakenham	Wallace's Brigade Lt Col Alexander Wallace	1st Battalion, 45th Foot: Lt Col Forbes (w), Maj Greenwell (w); 74th Foot; 1st Battalion, 88th Foot: Maj Murphy (k); 5th Battalion, 60th Foot (3 companies): Lt Col Williams (w), Maj Galiffe (w)
Third Division; Maj Gen Edward Pakenham	J. Campbell's Brigade Lt Col James Campbell (w)	1st Battalion, 5th Foot; 2nd Battalion, 5th Foot: Lt Col Bird (w); 2nd Battalion, 83rd Foot; 94th Foot
Third Division; Maj Gen Edward Pakenham	Power's Portuguese Brigade (8th Brigade) Col Manley Power	9th and 21st Line, 12th Caçadores
Fourth Division; Lt Gen Sir Galbraith Lowry Cole (w)	W. Anson's Brigade Maj Gen William Anson	3rd Battalion, 27th Foot; 1st Battalion, 40th Foot; 5th Battalion, 60th Foot (1 company)
Fourth Division; Lt Gen Sir Galbraith Lowry Cole (w)	Ellis' Brigade Lt Col Henry W. Ellis	1st Battalion, 7th Foot; 1st Battalion, 23rd Foot: Maj Dalmer (w); 1st Battalion, 48th Foot; Brunswick Oels (1 company)
Fourth Division; Lt Gen Sir Galbraith Lowry Cole (w)	Stubbs' Portuguese Brigade (9th Brigade) Col George Stubbs	11th and 23rd Line, 7th Caçadores
Fifth Division; Lt Gen James Leith (w); Maj Gen William H. Pringle	Greville's Brigade Lt Col James Greville	3rd Battalion, 1st Foot: Lt Col Barnes (w); 1st Battalion, 9th Foot; 1st Battalion, 38th Foot: Lt Col Miles (w); 2nd Battalion, 38th Foot; Brunswick Oels (1 company)
Fifth Division; Lt Gen James Leith (w); Maj Gen William H. Pringle	Pringle's Brigade Maj Gen William H. Pringle	1st Battalion, 4th Foot; 2nd Battalion, 4th Foot; 2nd Battalion, 30th Foot; 2nd Battalion, 44th Foot: Lt Col Barlow (k); Brunswick Oels (1 company)
Fifth Division; Lt Gen James Leith (w); Maj Gen William H. Pringle	Spry's Portuguese Brigade (3rd Brigade) Brig Gen William F. Spry	3rd and 15th Line, 8th Caçadores
Sixth Division; Maj Gen Sir Henry Clinton	Hulse's Brigade Maj Gen Richard Hulse	1st Battalion, 11th Foot: Lt Col Cuyler (w), Major McGregor (w); 2nd Battalion, 53rd Foot: Lt Col Bingham (w); 1st Battalion, 61st Foot; 5th Battalion, 60th Foot (1 company)
Sixth Division; Maj Gen Sir Henry Clinton	Hinde's Brigade Col Samuel Hinde	2nd Foot: Lt Col Kingsbury (w); 1st Battalion, 32nd Foot; 1st Battalion, 36th Foot
Sixth Division; Maj Gen Sir Henry Clinton	Rezende's Portuguese Brigade (7th Brigade) Brig Gen Conde de Rezende	8th and 12th Line, 9th Caçadores
Seventh Division; Maj Gen John Hope	Halkett's Brigade Col Colin Halkett	1st Light Battalion, King's German Legion; 2nd Light Battalion, King's German Legion; Brunswick Oels (7 companies)
Seventh Division; Maj Gen John Hope	De Bernewitz's Brigade Maj Gen J.H. de Bernewitz (or von Bernewitz)	51st Foot; 68th Foot; Chasseurs Britanniques
Seventh Division; Maj Gen John Hope	Collins' Portuguese Brigade (6th Brigade) Col Collins	7th and 19th Line, 2nd Caçadores
Light Division; Maj Gen Charles Baron von Alten	Barnard's Brigade Lt Col Andrew Barnard	1st Battalion, 43rd Foot; parts of 2nd and 3rd Battalions, 95th Foot (4 companies); 1st Caçadores
Light Division; Maj Gen Charles Baron von Alten	Vandeleur's Brigade Maj Gen John O. Vandeleur	1st Battalion, 52nd Foot; 1st Battalion, 95th Foot (8 companies); 3rd Caçadores
Independent Units	Pack's Brigade (1st Brigade) Brig Gen Denis Pack	1st and 16th Line, 4th Caçadores
Independent Units	Bradford's Brigade (10th Brigade) Brig Gen Thomas Bradford	13th and 24th Line, 5th Caçadores
Independent Units	Spanish Division Maj Gen Carlos de Espana	1st Battalion, 1st Princesa Regiment; Tiradores de Castilla; Cazadores de Castilla; 1st Battalion, 2nd Jaén Regiment; 3rd Battalion, 1st Seville Regiment; one battery of 6-pounders
Cavalry; Lt Gen Sir John Stapleton Cotton (w)	Le Marchant's Brigade Maj Gen John Gaspard Le Marchant (k); Col William Ponsonby	5th Dragoon Guards: Col William Ponsonby; 3rd Dragoons; 4th Dragoons: Col Lord Edward Somerset
Cavalry; Lt Gen Sir John Stapleton Cotton (w)	G. Anson's Brigade Maj Gen George Anson	11th Light Dragoons; 12th (Prince of Wales's) Light Dragoons; 16th (Queen's) Light Dragoons
Cavalry; Lt Gen Sir John Stapleton Cotton (w)	von Alten's Brigade Maj Gen Victor von Alten (w)	14th Light Dragoons: Lt Col Hervey; 1st Hussars, King's German Legion
Cavalry; Lt Gen Sir John Stapleton Cotton (w)	Bock's Brigade Maj Gen Baron Bock	1st Dragoons, King's German Legion; 2nd Dragoons, King's German Legion
Cavalry; Lt Gen Sir John Stapleton Cotton (w)	D'Urban's Portuguese Brigade Brig Gen Benjamin D'Urban	1st Portuguese Dragoons; 11th Portuguese Dragoons
Cavalry; Lt Gen Sir John Stapleton Cotton (w)	Julian Sanchez's Brigade Col Julian Sanchez	1st Lanceros Castilla; 2nd Lanceros Castilla; two 4-pounders cannons
Other	Artillery (54 guns) Lt Col Hoylet Framingham	Ross' Troop, Royal Horse Artillery; Bull's Troop, Royal Horse Artillery; McDonald's Troop, Royal Horse Artillery; Lawson's Company, Royal Artillery; Gardiner's Company, Royal Artillery; Greene's Company, Royal Artillery; Douglas's Company, Royal Artillery; May's Company, Royal Artillery; Sympher's Company, King's German Legion Artillery; Arriaga Battery, Portuguese Artillery

== French Army ==
Marshal Auguste de Marmont, Commander-in-Chief (w)
GD Jean Pierre François Bonet (w)
GD Bertrand Clausel (w)

Chief of Artillery: GB Louis Tirlet

Division	Brigade	Regiments and Others
1st Division; GB Maximilien Sebastien Foy	Brigade Chemineau	6th Leger, two battalions; 69th Ligne, two battalions
1st Division; GB Maximilien Sebastien Foy	Brigade Desgraviers-Berthelot GB Francois-Ganivet Desgraviers-Berthelot (mw)	39th Ligne, two battalions; 76th Ligne, two battalions
2nd Division; GD Bertrand Clausel	Brigade Berlier	25th Leger, three battalions; 27th Ligne, two battalions
2nd Division; GD Bertrand Clausel	Brigade Barbot	50th Ligne, three battalions; 59th Ligne, two battalions
3rd Division; GD Claude François Ferey (k)	Brigade Menne	31st Leger, two battalions; 26th Ligne, two battalions
3rd Division; GD Claude François Ferey (k)	2nd Brigade	47th Ligne, three battalions; 70th Ligne, two battalions
4th Division; GD Jacques Thomas Sarrut	Brigade Fririon	2nd Leger, three battalions; 36th Ligne, three battalions
4th Division; GD Jacques Thomas Sarrut	2nd Brigade	4th Leger, three battalions; 130th Ligne (absent)
5th Division; GD Antoine Louis Popon de Maucune	Brigade Arnaud	15th Ligne, three battalions; 66th Ligne, two battalions
5th Division; GD Antoine Louis Popon de Maucune	Brigade Montfort	82nd Ligne, two battalions; 86th Ligne, two battalions
6th Division; GD Antoine François Brenier de Montmorand	Brigade Taupin	17th Leger, two battalions; 65th Ligne, three battalions
6th Division; GD Antoine François Brenier de Montmorand	2nd Brigade	22nd Ligne, three battalions; Regiment de Prusse (remnants)
7th Division; GB Jean Guillaume Barthélemy Thomières (k)	Brigade Bonté	1st Ligne, three battalions; 62nd Ligne, two battalions
7th Division; GB Jean Guillaume Barthélemy Thomières (k)	2nd Brigade	101st Ligne, three battalions; 23rd Leger (absent)
8th Division; GD Jean Pierre François Bonet	Brigade Gautier	118th Ligne, three battalions; 119th Ligne, three battalions
8th Division; GD Jean Pierre François Bonet	2nd Brigade	120th Ligne, three battalions; 122nd Ligne, three battalions
Cavalry	Light Cavalry Division GB Jean-Baptiste T. Curto	3rd Hussars, two squadrons; 22nd Chasseurs, two squadrons; 26th Chasseurs, two squadrons; 28th Chasseurs, one squadron; 13th Chasseurs, five squadrons; 14th Chasseurs, four squadrons
Cavalry	Dragoon Division GB Pierre François Xavier Boyer	6th Dragoons, two squadrons; 11th Dragoons, two squadrons; 15th Dragoons, two squadrons; 25th Dragoons, two squadrons

== Sources ==
- Muir, Rory. Salamanca 1812. New Haven, Connecticut: Yale University Press, 2001. ISBN 0-300-08719-5.
- Fletcher, Ian. Men-at-Arms Campaign 48: Salamanca 1812. Great Britain: Osprey History, 1991. ISBN 1-84176-277-6.
