= Claude François Ferey =

French Army officer (1771–1812)

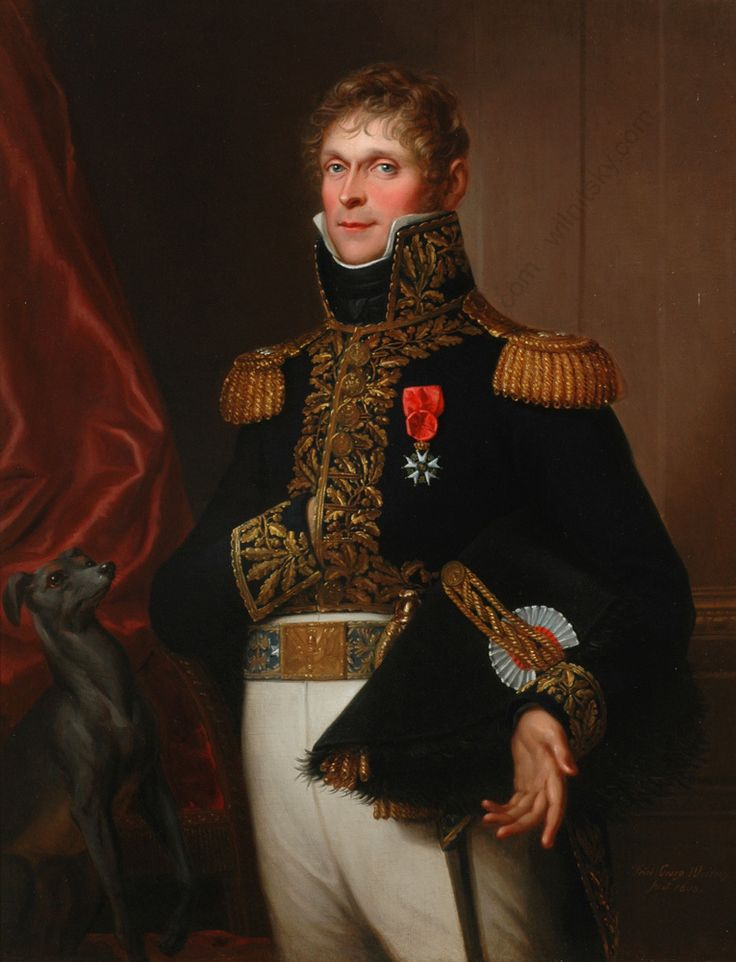
- Portrait by Friedrich Georg Weitsch, 1808
- Born: 21 September 1771; Auvet-et-la-Chapelotte, France
- Died: 24 July 1812 (aged 40) Arapiles, Salamanca
- Allegiance: Kingdom of France; French First Republic; First French Empire
- Branch: French Royal Army; French Revolutionary Army; French Imperial Army
- Service years: 1787–1812
- Rank: Divisional general
- Conflicts: War of the First Coalition; Siege of Mainz (1793); War in the Vendée; Battle of Neuwied (1797); War of the Second Coalition; Battle of Montebello (1800); Battle of Marengo; War of the Third Coalition; Battle of Austerlitz; War of the Fourth Coalition; Battle of Jena; Battle of Lübeck; Combat of Bergfried; Battle of Eylau; Battle of Lomitten; Battle of Heilsberg; Peninsular War; Battle of Bussaco; Battle of Casal Novo; Battle of Fuentes de Oñoro; Battle of Salamanca †
- Awards: Legion of Honour

Claude François Ferey, baron de Rozengath (21 September 1771 – 24 July 1812) was a French Army officer who served in the French Revolutionary and Napoleonic Wars. During the War of the First Coalition, he fought in the siege of Mainz and the War in the Vendée. After being promoted to command an infantry regiment, he led his unit at the battles of Neuwied, Montebello, and Marengo.

Ferey led a French brigade at Austerlitz during the War of the Third Coalition and Jena, Lübeck, Bergfried, Eylau, Lomitten, and Heilsberg during the War of the Fourth Coalition. While fighting in the Peninsular War, he led a brigade at Bussaco and a division at Fuentes de Oñoro and Salamanca. At the end of the latter battle, his division delayed the victorious Anglo-Portuguese forces while the rest of the French army withdrew; Ferey was killed by a round shot during the engagement. His surname is one of the Names inscribed under the Arc de Triomphe, on Column 38.

== Early career ==
Ferey was born on 20 November 1771 in Auvet-et-la-Chapelotte in the present-day department of Haute-Saône. On 19 March 1787, he enlisted in the 1st Chasseurs-à-Cheval Regiment of the French Royal Army. He was promoted brigadier on 20 February 1788 and maréchal des logis on 20 July 1790. He joined the Constitutional Guard of Louis XVI on 9 December 1791 and rapidly became a brigadier, then a maréchal des logis. After the Constitutional Guard disbanded on 30 May 1792, he was briefly a sous-lieutenant in the King's Regiment before he was elected adjutant major in the 9th Battalion of the Haute-Saône Volunteers. The battalion was assigned to the Army of the Rhine and found itself involved in the Siege of Mainz. During the siege, Ferey was wounded in the left knee and he was promoted captain of grenadiers. The siege lasted from 10 April to 23 July 1793, when the French garrison surrendered. Paroled on condition that they would not fight against the Allies for one year, the French soldiers were immediately sent to fight against French Royalists in the War in the Vendée.

== Leadership ==
In the Battle of Tiffauges on 19 September 1793, two superior officers were killed and Ferey took command of the battalion. For his efforts, Jean Baptiste Camille Canclaux and Jean-Baptiste Kléber promoted Ferey chef de bataillon (major). He continued serving with the Army of the West and the Army of the Coasts of the Ocean from 1793 to 1796. Ferey was promoted chef de brigade (colonel) of the 24th Light Infantry Regiment on 11 October 1796. He transferred to the Army of Sambre and Meuse and fought in the Battle of Neuwied on 18 April 1797. In the pursuit, his regiment captured the Chasseurs de Loup Battalion and 300 Croats.

In 1800, the 24th Light was assigned, with the 43rd and 96th Line Infantry Regiments to Jacques-Antoine de Chambarlhac's division of Napoleon Bonaparte's Army of Reserve which invaded northern Italy. Chambarlhac's division fought at the Battle of Montebello on 9 June 1800 and at the Battle of Marengo on 14 June. At Montebello, the division arrived late on the field and the 24th Light was sent to attack the Austrian left flank. At Marengo, the 24th Light mustered a strength of 2,171 men. As punishment for bad behavior at Montebello, the 24th Light was assigned to screen the army the night before Marengo was fought, and it endured being bombarded by Austrian artillery.

== Empire ==
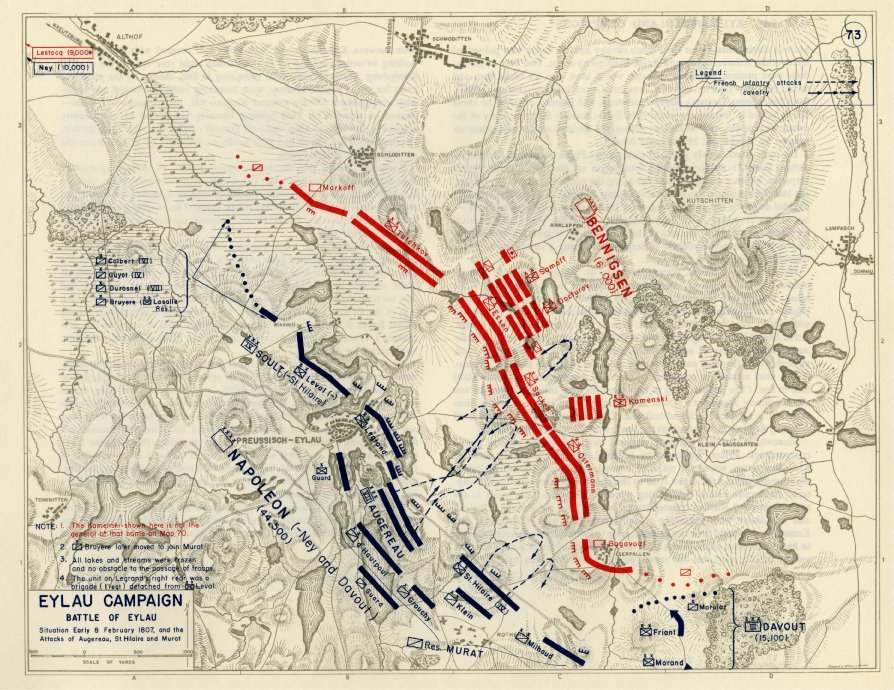
Leval's division formed the French left flank at the Battle of Eylau on the morning of 8 February 1807.

Ferey was promoted to general of brigade on 29 August 1803. He was named a Commander of the Legion of Honor on 14 June 1804. At the Battle of Austerlitz on 2 December 1805, he led a brigade in Dominique Vandamme's 2nd Division in Marshal Jean-de-Dieu Soult's IV Corps. The brigade consisted of the 46th and 57th Line Infantry Regiments. At the Battle of Jena-Auerstedt on 14 October 1806, Ferey commanded a brigade in Jean François Leval's 2nd Division in Soult's IV Corps. The brigade included the 4th and 28th Line Infantry Regiments. In the Battle of Lübeck on 6 November 1806, the French captured the city of Lübeck from a Prussian corps led by Gebhard Leberecht von Blücher. Leval's division was among the attacking formations. Cornered against the Danish border, the Prussians surrendered on 7 November.

Leval's division, including Ferey's brigade, was involved in a minor clash at Bergfried on 3 February 1807. The French sustained 306 casualties while fighting against a Prussian-Russian force. Ferey commanded a brigade in Leval's division at the Battle of Eylau on 7–8 February 1807. In this major battle, both French and Russian casualties were very high. In the Battle of Lomitten on 5 June 1807, Ferey's brigade was part of Claude Carra Saint-Cyr's division. The division sustained losses of 106 killed and 1,079 wounded. At the Battle of Heilsberg on 10 June 1807, Soult's IV Corps suffered 8,286 casualties and Ferey was wounded.

Ferey was raised to the dignity of Baron of the Empire on 15 January 1809. He was assigned to Marshal André Massena's Army of Portugal. He commanded a brigade in Louis Henri Loison's 3rd Division in Marshal Michel Ney's VI Corps. On 15 September 1810, the brigade was composed of the 2nd Battalion of the 32nd Light Infantry Regiment (20 officers, 393 men), the 4th, 5th, and 6th Battalions of the 66th Line (68 officers, 1,762 men), and the 4th and 6th Battalions of the 82nd Line (40 officers, 1,196 men). At the Battle of Bussaco on 27 September 1810, Loison's division was ordered to attack the Anglo-Portuguese left flank. The division fought its way up the ridge through the Allied skirmishers in two main attack columns, with Ferey's brigade on the left. As the French neared the crest, they were surprised when British infantry appeared and fired a volley from very close range, routing them. Ferey's left-most battalion was repulsed by a Portuguese battalion. The battle cost Ferey's brigade 56 killed and 385 wounded.

Ferey was promoted general of division on 3 October 1810. During the retreat from Portugal, Massena dismissed Ney from command of VI Corps and replaced him with Loison; Ferey assumed command of Loison's division. Ferey commanded his division at the Battle of Fuentes de Oñoro on 3 and 5 May 1811. At the battle, Ferey's division counted 199 officers and 4,033 men. The units were 1 battalion each of the Légion du Midi and Légion Hanovrienne, the 4th, 5th, and 6th Battalions of the 26th and 66th Line Infantry Regiments, and the 4th and 6th Battalions of the 82nd Line.

On 3 May, Ferey launched his first brigade in an assault on Fuentes de Oñoro. It gained some ground but was evicted from the village by a British counterattack. Ferey then committed his second brigade which seized almost the entire village. The British commander, Lord Wellington counterattacked with three battalions and drove Ferey's men out of the village. Part of another French division was committed to the battle, but they made no significant gains. On 3 May, French losses numbered 652, including 167 captured, mostly in Ferey's division. Ferey's division again assaulted Fuentes de Oñoro two hours after dawn on 5 May. In the initial push, two companies of the 79th Foot were surrounded and 94 men captured. A British counterattack drove the French back. At this point, Ferey's division was no longer battleworthy and, for the rest of the day, Jean-Baptiste Drouet's IX Corps bore the burden of fighting in the village. On 5 May, the VI Corps suffered losses of 107 killed, 804 wounded, and 33 missing. Of these, Ferey's division lost at least 400 casualties.

== Death ==
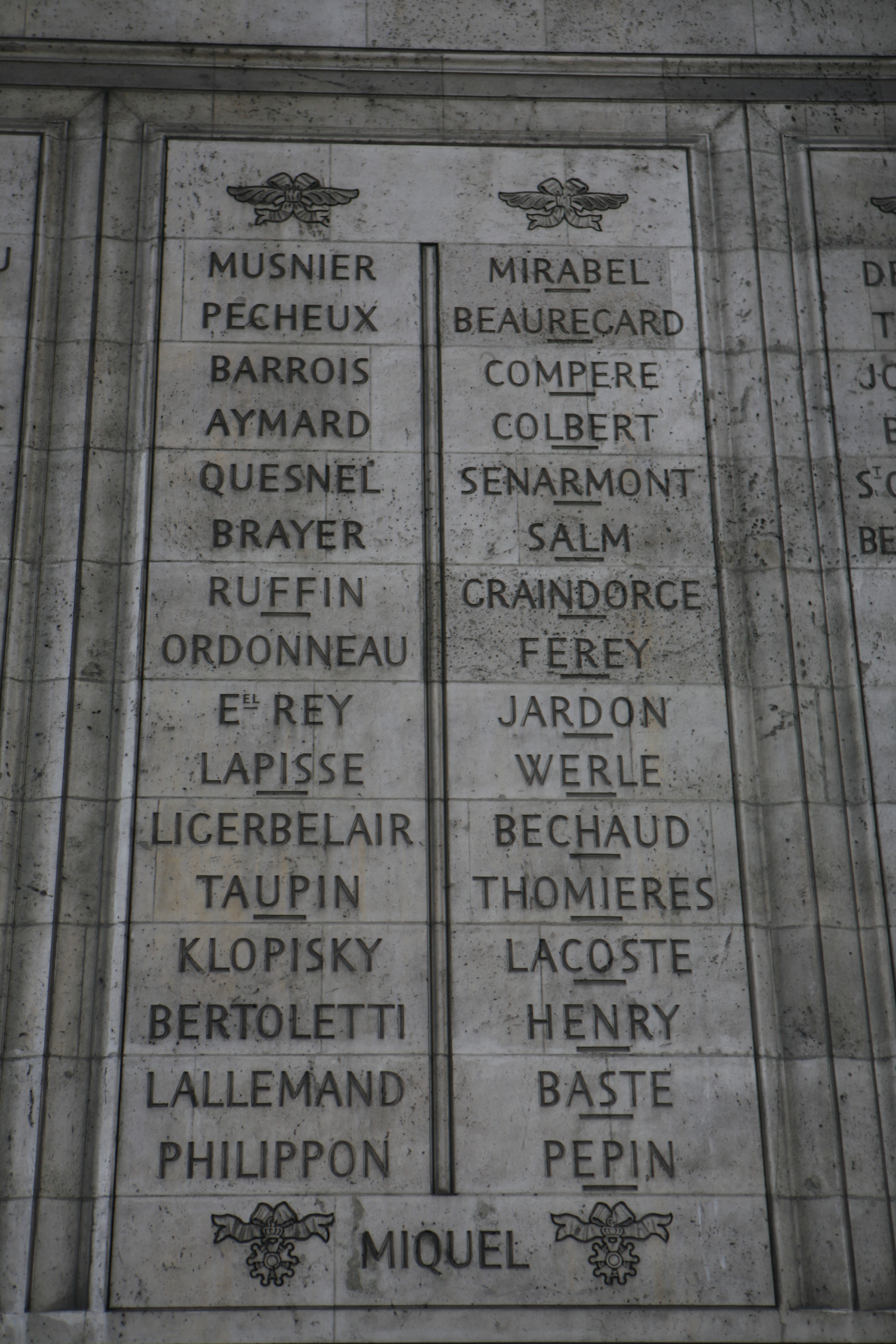
Ferey is the 8th name under Column 38 on the Arc de Triomphe.

At the Battle of Salamanca on 22 July 1812, Ferey commanded the 3rd Division of Marshal Auguste de Marmont's Army of Portugal. The division numbered 221 officers and 5,478 men. Its units were 3 battalions of the 47th Line, and 2 battalions each of the 31st Light, 26th Line, and 70th Line Infantry Regiments, plus an artillery battery. Marmont attempted to turn the right flank of the Anglo-Portuguese army by marching his left flank divisions to the west. When the French divisions became too widely extended, Wellington attacked them and quickly routed the divisions of Jean Guillaume Barthélemy Thomières and Antoine Louis Popon de Maucune. Next, British heavy dragoons overran Antoine François Brenier's division. While these events were going on, Marmont and his senior division commander Jean Pierre François Bonet were both wounded by bursting shells, leaving Bertrand Clauzel in command of the army. Meanwhile, the divisions of Clauzel and Bonet pushed back Lowry Cole's 4th Anglo-Portuguese division. Clausel sent Jacques Thomas Sarrut's division to assist his mauled left flank and tried to exploit the success in the center. But Wellington rapidly brought up the 6th Division and other troops to defeat the divisions of Clauzel and Bonet.

With the beaten French army streaming to the rear, only two intact French divisions remained. Clauzel ordered Ferey to hold off the victorious Allies at all costs. Historian Charles Oman wrote that Ferey, "carried it out with splendid courage, and by his constancy gave time for the escape of the whole of the confused mass behind him." Ferey deployed 7 battalions in a single three-deep line with 2 battalions on each flank in square to protect against cavalry. Because it was late in the day, Henry Clinton ordered his 6th Division to attack at once with his two British brigades in the first line. They were met by a terrific initial volley that caused severe casualties. After a tremendous firefight, Ferey's division withdrew to the edge of a large forest. The worst-hit British units were the 11th Foot with 340 casualties out of 516 men present and the 61st Foot with 366 casualties out of 546. Clinton ordered his Portuguese brigade from the second line to attack. These soldiers suffered 487 killed and wounded before they withdrew. Ferey's soldiers finally fled into the woods after they were pressed by the British 5th Division on their left flank and a brigade of the 4th Division on their right flank. Their retreat was covered by the still-intact 31st Light Infantry. The 6th Division only pursued 100 yd (91 m) before going into bivouac. During his division's last stand in front of the forest, Ferey was struck and killed by a round shot.

== Same name ==
A different Claude François Ferey, born on 22 December 1723, attained the rank of general of brigade on 25 August 1793, and died on 6 January 1806. He had an undistinguished career with the Army of the Rhine.
