= Battle of Corunna order of battle =

This is the order of battle for the Battle of Corunna, 16 January 1809.

== French II Corps d'Armée ==
Commander-in-chief: Marshal Jean-de-Dieu Soult

Total: between 13,000 and 20,000 (Note: >Glover puts the French strength at 12,000 infantry and 3,300 cavalry)

Division	Brigade	Regiments and Others
1st Division général de division Pierre Hugues Victoire Merle	1st Brigade; GB Hilaire Benoît Reynaud	2e Légère; 36e Ligne
1st Division général de division Pierre Hugues Victoire Merle	2nd Brigade; GB Jacques Thomas Sarrut	4e Légère
1st Division général de division Pierre Hugues Victoire Merle	3rd Brigade; GB Jean Guillaume Barthélemy Thomières	15e Ligne
2nd Division; GD Julien Augustin Joseph Mermet	1st Brigade; GB Joseph Yves Manigault-Gaulois †	122e Ligne
2nd Division; GD Julien Augustin Joseph Mermet	2nd Brigade; GB Henri-Antoine Jardon	31e Légère; 47e Ligne
2nd Division; GD Julien Augustin Joseph Mermet	3rd Brigade; GB Simon Lefebvre (WIA)	2e Suisse; 3e Suisse
3rd Division; GD Henri François Delaborde	1st Brigade; GB Maximilien Sébastien Foy	70e Ligne; 86e Ligne
3rd Division; GD Henri François Delaborde	2nd Brigade; GB Jean Baptiste Arnaud	17e Légère; 4e Suisse
1st Cavalry Division; GD Armand Lebrun de La Houssaye		17e Dragons; 18e Dragons; 19e Dragons; 27e Dragons
2nd Cavalry Division; GD Jean Thomas Guillaume Lorge Brigadiers: GB Fournier, GB Jean-Baptiste Viallanes		13e Dragons; 15e Dragons; 22e Dragons; 25e Dragons
3rd Cavalry Division; GD Jean Baptiste, baron Franceschi		1e Hussards; 8e Dragons; 22e Chasseurs à Cheval; Hanoverian Chasseurs
Artillery		20 guns

== British Army ==
Commander-in-Chief: Lt Gen Sir John Moore.

After Moore was mortally wounded Lt General Sir David Baird took command until he was wounded at which point Lt Gen the Hon John Hope took command

Total: approx. 15,000 (Note: The four infantry divisions had a strength of 22,000 on 19 December, the last date for which returns are available. There were considerable losses on the retreat to Corunna, so the best estimate is around 15,000 on the day of the battle)

Division	Brigade	Regiments and others
Cavalry Division (Note: The cavalry had already embarked, and took no part in the battle); Lt Gen Lord Paget	1st Brigade (Brigadier General John Slade)	7th Hussars; 10th Hussars; 15th Hussars
Cavalry Division; Lt Gen Lord Paget	2nd Brigade (Brig Gen the Hon Charles Stewart)	18th Light Dragoons; 3rd Light Dragoons KGL
1st Division; Lt Gen Sir David Baird	1st Brigade; Maj Gen Henry Warde	1/1st Guards; 2/1st Guards
1st Division; Lt Gen Sir David Baird	2nd Brigade; Maj Gen Lord William Bentinck	1/4th Foot; 1/42nd Foot; 1/50th Foot
1st Division; Lt Gen Sir David Baird	3rd Brigade; Maj Gen Coote Manningham	3/1st Foot; 1/26th Foot; 2/81st Foot
2nd Division; Lt Gen the Hon John Hope	1st Brigade; Maj Gen James Leith	51st Foot; 2/59th Foot; 2/76th Foot
2nd Division; Lt Gen the Hon John Hope	2nd Brigade; Maj Gen Rowland Hill	2nd Foot; 1/5th Foot; 2/14th Foot; 1/32nd Foot
2nd Division; Lt Gen the Hon John Hope	3rd Brigade; Brig Gen James Catlin Craufurd	1/36th Foot; 1/71st Foot; 1/92nd Foot
3rd Division; Lt Gen Alexander Fraser	1st Brigade; Maj Gen William Carr Beresford	1/6th Foot; 1/9th Foot; 2/23rd Foot; 2/43rd Foot
3rd Division; Lt Gen Alexander Fraser	2nd Brigade; Brig Gen Henry Fane	1/38th Foot; 1/79th Foot; 1/82nd Foot
Reserve Division; Maj Gen the Hon Edward Paget	1st Brigade; Brig Gen Robert Anstruther	20th Foot; 1/52nd Foot; 1/95th Rifles
Reserve Division; Maj Gen the Hon Edward Paget	2nd Brigade; Brig Gen Moore Disney	1/28th Foot; 1/91st Foot
Flank Brigades (Note: Detached to Vigo at the start of January)	1st Flank Brigade; Col Robert Craufurd	1/43rd Foot; 2/52nd Foot; 2/95th Rifles
Flank Brigades	2nd Flank Brigade; Brig Gen Charles, Count Alten	1st Light Bn KGL; 2nd Light Bn KGL
	Artillery	Nine guns: Truscott's Battery (Note: The men from several other batteries whose guns had already been embarked remained to help man the nine guns); Wilmot's Battery
