= John Bisset =

John Bisset or Bissett may refer to:

- John Byset (died 1257), Scoto-Norman nobleman
- John Bissett of Lovat (died 1260), his son, Scottish nobleman
- Sir John Jarvis Bisset (1819–1894), British Army officer
- Sir John Bisset (British Army officer) (1777–1854), commissary officer
- Jack Bisset (1900–1966), Australian rules footballer
