= Venetian Castle =

- Mletački kaštel
- Split in Croatia
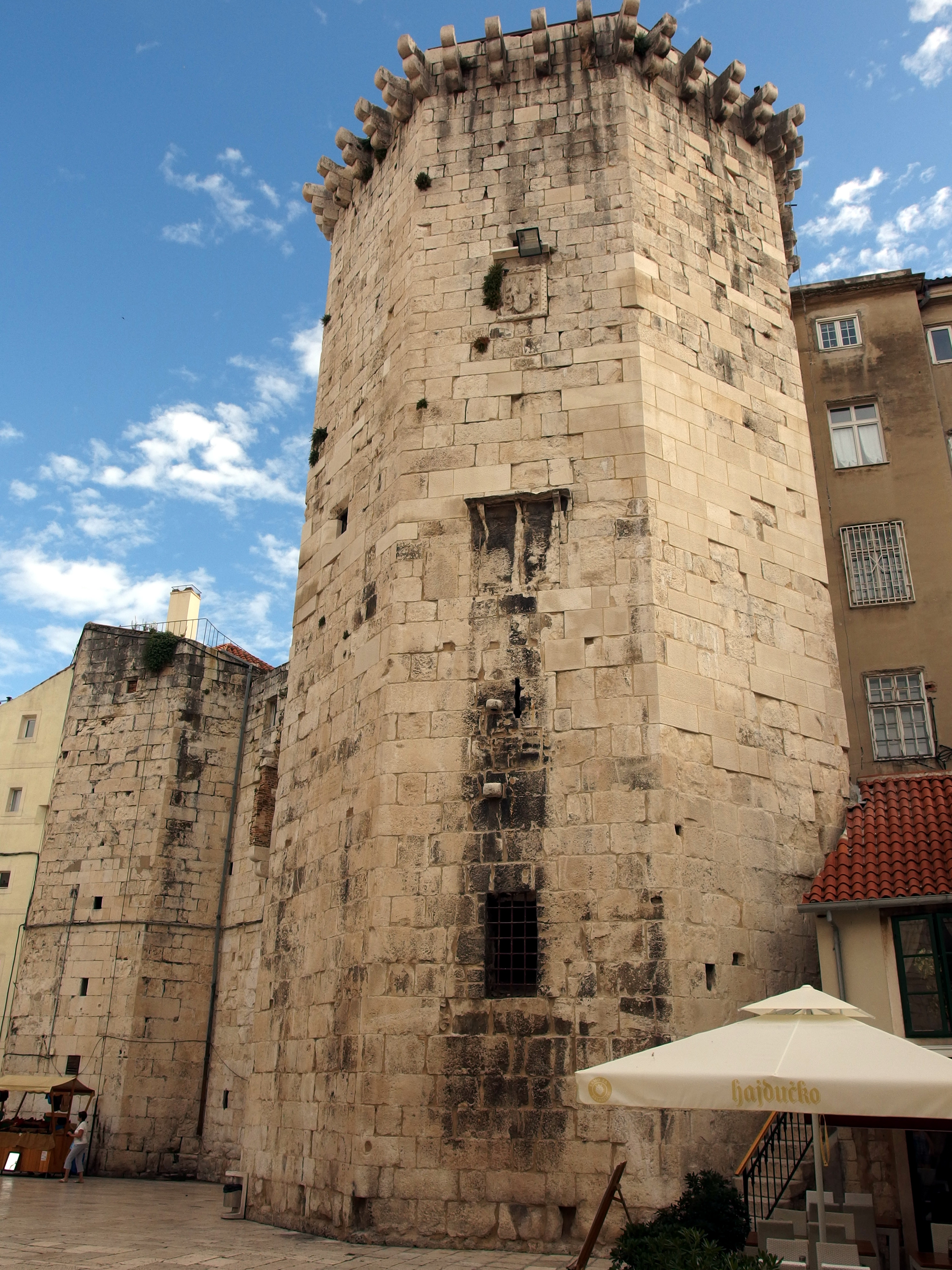
- The largest (central) tower and the smaller eastern tower (on the left) with the wall connecting them is what remains of the castle today.

Site information
- Operator: City Museum of Split

Location
- Coordinates: 43°30′29″N 16°26′18″E
- Height: 24 m

Site history
- Built: 1441
- Built by: Republic of Venice
- Fate: Partially demolished between 1806 and 1807

The Venetian Castle (Croatian: Mletački kaštel) was a medieval castle built during the 15th century in Split, present-day Croatia. Built just south-west of the Diocletian's Palace along the shoreline, the castle had an irregular pentagonal shape with three towers facing north and overlooking the city. The decision to build the castle was made in 1424, however, it wasn't until 1441 that it was actually built on the grounds of a demolished monastery. By the early 16th century, the castle was in poor condition and it wasn't until the first half of the 17th century that work on improving it began.

By the early 19th century, the castle had lost its defensive purpose and the southern walls were demolished between 1806 and 1807 on the orders of Auguste de Marmont during the Napoleonic Wars. Presently, what remains of the castle is the large central tower and the smaller eastern tower with the wall connecting them, both located on the Radić Brothers Square (Trg braće Radić), also known as the Fruit Square (Voćni trg).
