= Sebastião de Arriaga =

Portuguese army officer (1774–1826)

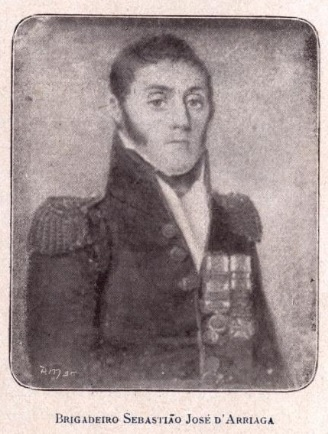
- Born: 13 April 1774; Horta, Azores, Portugal
- Died: 2 August 1826 (aged 52); Lisbon, Portugal
- Relatives: Manuel de Arriaga (grandson)
- Military career
- Conflicts: Peninsular War; Battle of Albuera; Battle of Almaraz; Battle of Salamanca; Battle of Vitoria; Siege of San Sebastián; Battle of the Nive; Battle of Toulouse; Battle of the Pyrenees; Battle of San Marcial

Sebastião José de Arriaga Brum da Silveira (13 April 1774 – 2 August 1826) was a Portuguese military commander.

== Early career ==
Arriaga enlisted at the age of 19 as an ensign in the Infantry Company of Santa Cruz Fortress, Faial Island, in the Azores, later transferring to artillery.

== Peninsular War ==
As a captain, Arriaga commanded one of the two batteries brigaded under Major Alexander Dickson that accompanied Beresford's Army to Extremadura, and saw action at the Battle of Albuera (16 May 1811). The following September–October, his company was one of the two Portuguese artillery companies that formed part of Hill's forces, together with Lefebure's RHA Troop, Hawker's and Meadows's Royal Artillery Companies.

Major Arriaga's 24-pounder howitzer battery, belonging to the 1st (Lisbon) Regiment, formed part of the Artillery Reserve, and accompanied Wellington's own army to the siege of Badajoz (16 March – 6 April 1812), Salamanca (22 July 1812), and the siege of Burgos (19 September – 21 October 1812).

Arriaga's Portuguese artillery company, together with Glubb's British company, and who brought with them six 24-pounder howitzers, a pontoon train, and wagons carrying some 30-foot ladders for escalading work, were attached to Dickson's detachment for the raid at Battle of Almaraz (May 1812).

For his action at the Battle of Vitoria (21 June 1813), Major Arriaga, commanding the 1st Artillery Brigade, was mentioned in dispatches by the commander of the Portuguese artillery, Lieutenant Colonel Dickson, Wellington's "most trusted artillery officer", for making "good and accurate fire" and averaging fifteen shots per gun.

Arriaga's 1st Brigade took part in the siege of San Sebastián (7 July – 8 September 1813) as part of Dickson's siege artillery, and was again mentioned in dispatches by Dickson.

Arriaga later saw action the Battles of the Nive (9–13 December 1813) and was again mentioned in dispatches by Dickson.

Now a lieutenant colonel, Arriaga served under Lieutenant Colonel Victor von Arentschild, commander of the Artillery Brigades, at the Battle of Toulouse (1814).

== Post-war period ==
From 1815 to 1821, Arriaga was the military governor of São Miguel Island and later, as a brigadier, and until his death, the governor of Lisbon's Fort of São Julião da Barra.

== Family ==
Arriaga was the grandfather of Manuel de Arriaga, the first elected president of the First Portuguese Republic.
