= Richard Hulse =

British Army general

Major-General Richard Hulse
- Born: c.1775
- Died: 7 September 1812; Arévalo, Spain
- Military career
- Allegiance: United Kingdom
- Branch: British Army
- Service years: 1790–1812
- Rank: Major-General
- Unit: Coldstream Guards
- Commands: 1st Battalion, Coldstream Guards; Guards Brigade, 1st Division; 1st Brigade, 6th Division; 1st Brigade, 5th Division; 5th Division
- Conflicts: French Revolutionary Wars; Flanders campaign; Napoleonic Wars; Hanover Expedition; Copenhagen Expedition; Peninsular War; Second Battle of Porto; Battle of Talavera; Battle of Busaco; Battle of Fuentes de Onoro; Battle of El Bodón; Siege of the Salamanca forts; Battle of Salamanca
- Awards: Army Gold Medal with clasp

Major-General Richard Hulse (c. 1775 – 7 September 1812) was a senior British Army officer who saw action in the Napoleonic Wars.

== Early life ==
Hulse was the son of Sir Edward Hulse, 3rd Baronet and Mary Lethieullier: his parents lived at Breamore House in Hampshire.

== Military career ==
Hulse was commissioned as an ensign in the 2nd Regiment of Foot Guards in 1790. He saw action in the Flanders campaign between 1794 and 1795, and having been promoted to lieutenant-colonel in 1800, he was deployed to Hanover under the command of General William Cathcart. He next saw action at the Battle of Copenhagen in 1807.

Deployed to Spain for service in the Peninsular War, he temporarily commanded a brigade in the 1st Division from November to December 1809 and then commanded the 1st Brigade in the 6th Division from November 1810 to July 1812. He commanded his brigade at the Battle of Fuentes de Oñoro in May 1811 and then commanded it again, and suffered heavy losses, at the Battle of Salamanca in July 1812.

After that he became acting General Officer Commanding the 5th Division on 22 July 1812 and substantive General Officer Commanding the 5th Division on 31 July 1812. He died of typhus on 7 September 1812.
