= Antoine François Brenier de Montmorand =

Antoine-François Brenier de Montmorand
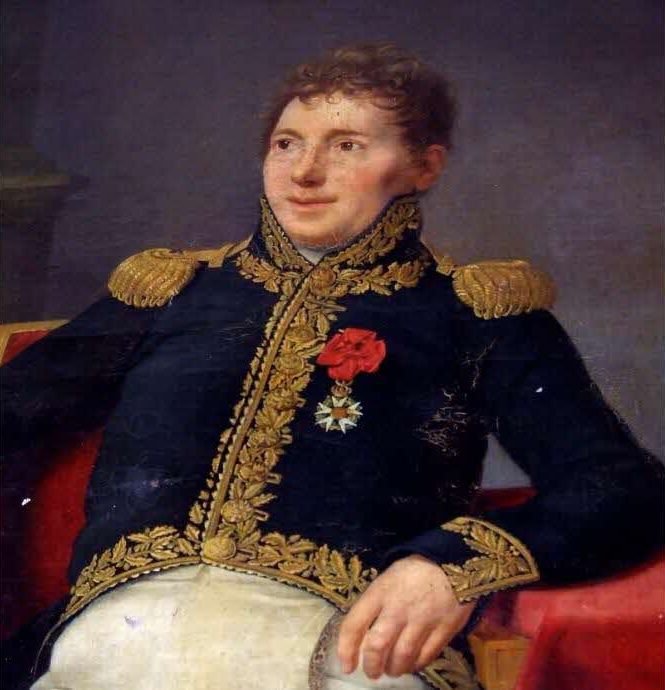
- Born: 12 November 1767; Saint-Marcellin, Isère, France
- Died: 8 October 1832 (aged 64)
- Allegiance: France
- Branch: Infantry
- Service years: 1786–1827
- Rank: General of Division
- Conflicts: French Revolutionary Wars; Napoleonic Wars
- Awards: Legion of Honour
- Other work: Baron of the Empire

Antoine-François Brenier de Montmorand (French pronunciation: [ɑ̃twan fʁɑ̃swa bʁənje də mɔ̃mɔʁɑ̃]; 12 November 1767 at Saint-Marcellin, Isère – 8 October 1832) served as a French general of division during the period of the First French Empire and became an officer of the Legion of Honour.

== Early career ==
Brenier enlisted in 1786 and gained rapid promotion during the period of the French Revolutionary Wars, becoming an aide-de-camp in 1792 and in 1793 a Chef de brigade (colonel) in the Army of the Eastern Pyrenees (Armée des Pyrénées orientales). He served with distinction in various campaigns of the Revolutionary Wars, in Italy and in Holland. In 1799 he became Général de brigade. From 1801 to 1807 he served in administrative posts.

== Peninsular War ==
At the start of the Peninsular War, Brenier was assigned to Jean Andoche Junot's army for the 1807 Invasion of Portugal. During the Battle of Vimeiro on 20 August 1808, Brenier's brigade made the opening attack against the British held ridge, but it was driven back. Later General Jean-Andoche Junot ordered Brenier to take his Brigade on a flanking manoeuvre, he chose to take an even longer route to avoid narrow paths, this made his men arrive late, after Jean-Baptiste Solignac's Brigade had been defeated. Brenier ordered his dragoons forward but they were driven off and the rallying British including the 71st (Highland) Regiment of Foot drive his brigade off with accurate volley fire, which wounded Brenier and led to him being captured by the 71st Regiment. Wounded and captured by the British, he returned to France from captivity in 1809.

In 1810 he again went to Portugal, serving under Marshal André Masséna. After the first Siege of Almeida, Brenier became its governor and held the post during Massena's unsuccessful third French invasion of Portugal in 1810–1811. After the French army's retreat from Portugal, Arthur Wellesley, 1st Duke of Wellington's British army blockaded Almeida. While marching to Brenier's relief, Massena failed to fight his way past Wellington in the Battle of Fuentes de Onoro.

During the night of 10 May 1811 Brenier threaded his 1,400-man garrison through the lines of the 13,000-strong British investment force in the second Siege of Almeida. His engineers set explosives which demolished the fortifications after his men got away. During the pursuit he lost 360 men, but the pursuing British ran into an ambush set by some troops of Jean Reynier's II Corps and the rest of Brenier's soldiers safely reached French lines. Wellington wrote, "I have never been so much distressed by any military event as by the escape of even a man of them." This brilliant exploit earned Brenier promotion to general of division.

During the Battle of Salamanca, Brenier's 4,300-man 6th Division arrived inopportunely at the unfolding disaster on the left flank. Wellington's forces had just crushed the divisions of Jean Guillaume Barthélemy Thomières and Antoine Louis Popon de Maucune when Brenier's men came up, winded from a rapid march. Still in battalion columns, the division was first swamped with fleeing troops from Maucune's division, then beset by a brigade of British heavy dragoons led by John Le Marchant. Attacked before they could form square, Brenier's battalions were overrun and routed. However, some troops managed to rally in a forest and emerged from the woods in battle order. The heavy dragoons attacked again, this time breaking the division for good, but Le Marchant was killed in the action.

== Later career ==
Brenier played an honorable part in the campaign of 1813. Leading the 9th Division in Marshal Michel Ney's III Corps, he was severely wounded at the Battle of Lützen in Saxony on 2 May 1813. In 1814 he became commander of the 16th military district and supervised the fortification of Lille. Afterwards he took over the command of the city of Brest, where his actions during the Hundred Days earned him a sword of honour voted him by the municipal council. Brenier became a Count, the Inspector General of the Infantry from 1816 to 1818, and the supreme commander in Corsica from 1820 to 1823. He retired in 1827 and died on 8 October 1832.

His name appears on the west side of the Arc de Triomphe in Paris, on Column 35.

== Promotions ==
- 1 September 1795 : Chef de brigade of the 14th Regiment (14th half-brigade) of Line Infantry
- 1 January 1797 : Chef de brigade of the 63rd Regiment (63rd half-brigade) of Line Infantry
- 15 June 1799 : Général de brigade
- 26 March 1811 : Général de division

== Honours ==
- 12 February 1812 : Baron of the Empire
- 18 December 1813 : Officer of the Legion of Honour
