= John Bisset (British Army officer, born 1777) =

Scottish commissariat officer

Commissary-General Sir John Bisset KCB KCH
- Born: 1777
- Died: 3 April 1854 (aged 76–77)
- Military career
- Allegiance: United Kingdom
- Branch: British Army; Commissariat
- Rank: Commissary-General
- Conflicts: Napoleonic Wars

Commissary-General Sir John Bisset, KCB, KCH (1777–1854) was a commissary officer in the British Army. He was appointed commissary-general in Spain in 1811; and was made Knight Commander of Guelphic Order in 1830, and KCB in 1850. He published a work on commissariat duties.

== Life ==
Bisset served in the commissariat at home from 1795 to 1800, in Germany from May 1800 to June 1802, at home from 1802 to 1806, in South America in 1800–7, and at the Scheldt in 1809. He was appointed commissary-general in Spain in 1811, and had charge of the commissariat of the Duke of Wellington's army at one of the most important periods of the Peninsular War, before and after the Battle of Salamanca.

Bisset, who was made a Knight-Bachelor and Knight-Commander of the Guelphic Order in 1830, was the author of a small work entitled Memoranda regarding the Duties of the Commissariat on Field Service abroad (London, 1816). He was made KCB in 1850. He died at Perth on 3 April 1854.

== Sources ==
- War Office Records;
- Report from the Select Committee on Army and Ordnance Expenditure (Commissariat), 1850;
- Perth Advertiser, April 1854.

== Bibliography ==
- Chichester, Henry Manners (1886). "Bisset, John" . In Stephen, Leslie (ed.). Dictionary of National Biography. Vol. 5. London: Smith, Elder & Co. p. 101.
- Heathcote, T. A. (2010). Wellington's Peninsular War Generals & Their Battles. London: Pen & Sword Books Ltd. pp. 20–23.
