= Arapiles, Castile and León =

Arapiles
- Municipality
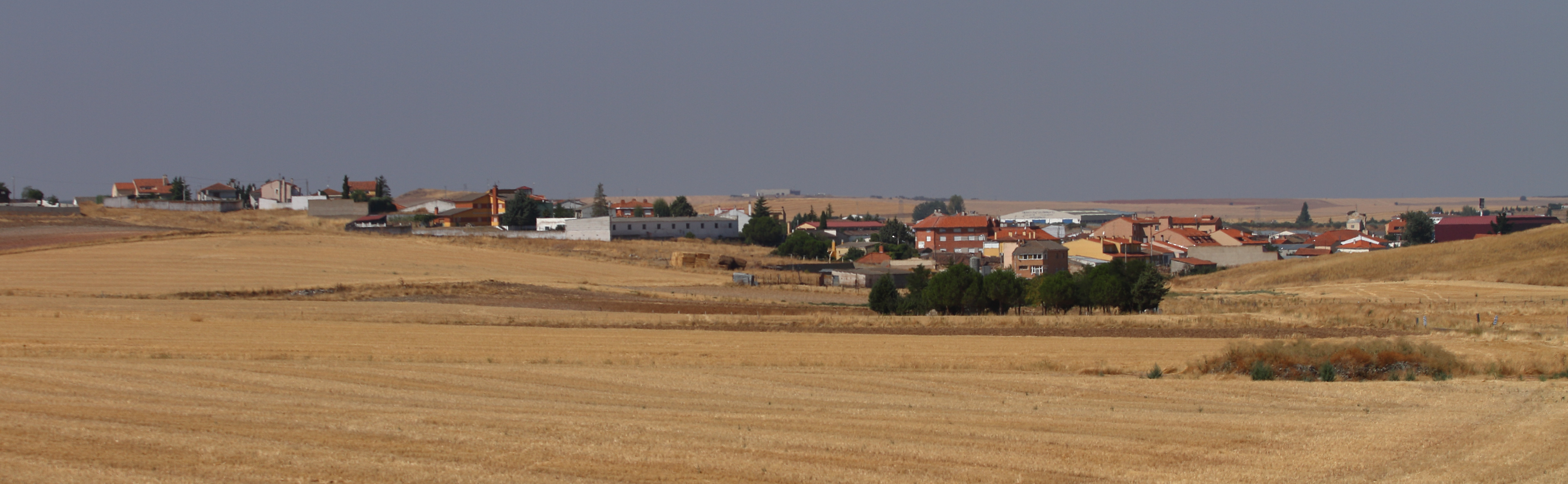

- Flag Coat of arms

- Location in Salamanca

- Location in Spain
- Coordinates: 40°53′39″N 5°38′41″W
- Country: Spain
- Autonomous community: Castile and León
- Province: Salamanca
- Comarca: Campo de Salamanca

Government
  - Mayor: Sigifredo Marcos Rodríguez (People's Party)

Area
  - Total: 25 km^{2} (9.7 sq mi)
- Elevation: 840 m (2,760 ft)

Population (2025-01-01)
  - Total: 744
  - Density: 30/km^{2} (77/sq mi)
- Time zone: UTC+1 (CET)
  - Summer (DST): UTC+2 (CEST)
- Postal code: 37796

Arapiles is a village and municipality in the province of Salamanca, western Spain, and part of the autonomous community of Castile and León. It is located 8 kilometres (5.0 mi) from the city of Salamanca and has a population of 645 people. The municipality covers an area of 25 km^{2} (9.7 sq mi).

The village lies 840 metres (2,760 ft) above sea level.

The postal code is 37796.

== History ==
In 1812 there was a battle in the vicinity known as the Battle of Salamanca (Batalla de los Arapiles) fought in the Peninsular War.

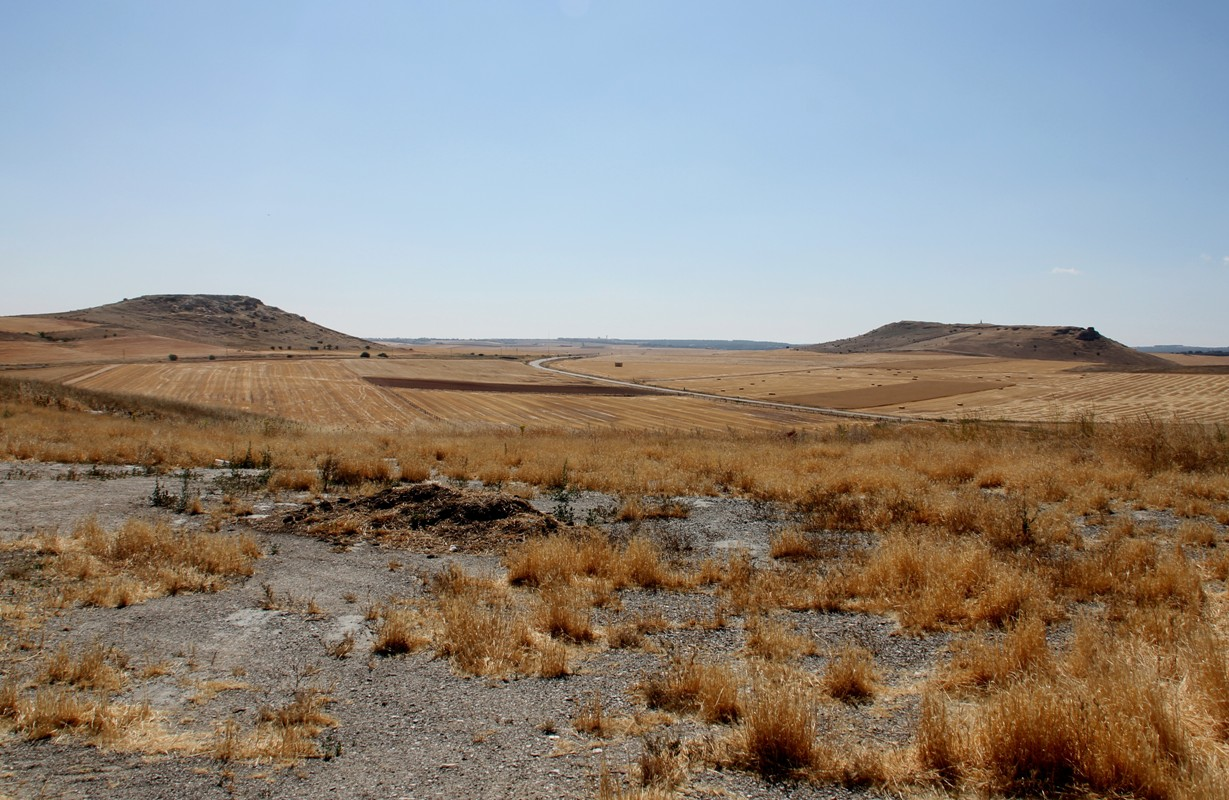
Seen from the village, the Lesser Arapile (Arapil Chico) is on the left

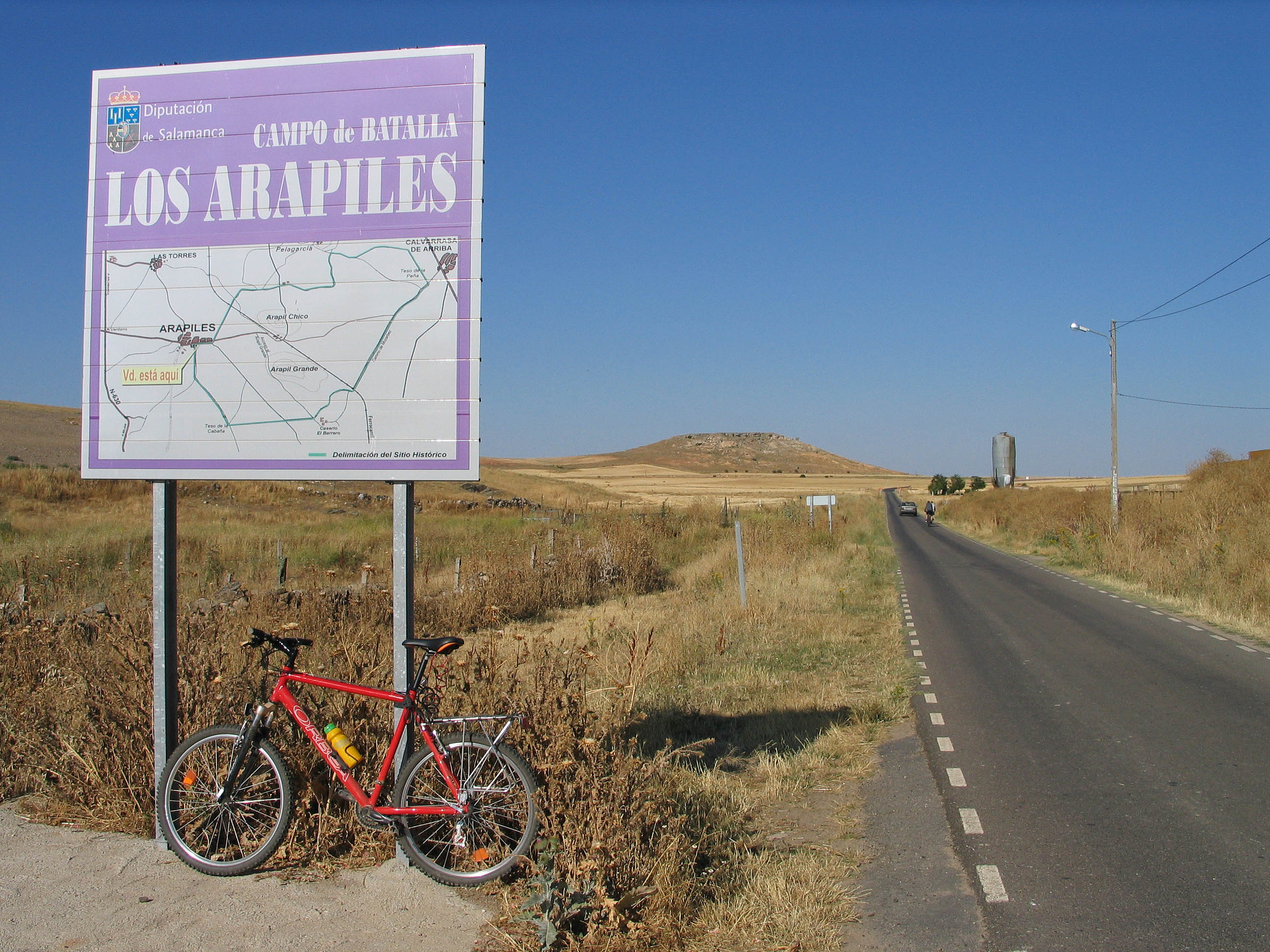
Sign showing the battlefield at Arapiles
