= Battle of Salamanca =

1812 battle of the Peninsular War

- Part of the Peninsular War
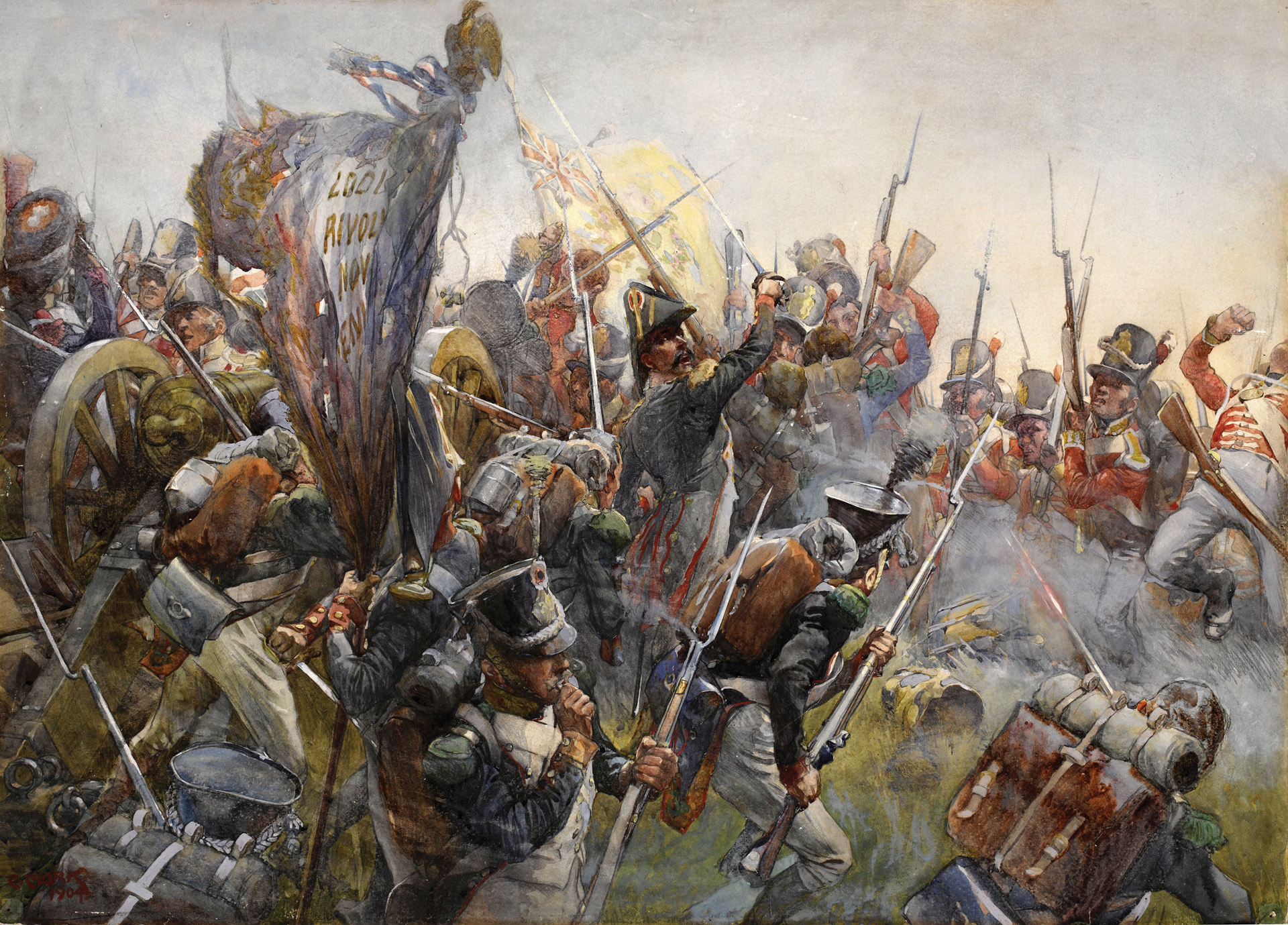
- 1904 illustration of the battle
Date	22 July 1812
Location	Arapiles, Salamanca 40°53′21″N 05°37′29″W
Result	Coalition victory
Territorial changes	The French abandon the region of Andalusia

Belligerents
(First French Empire) French Empire	(United Kingdom of Great Britain and Ireland) United Kingdom; Portugal; Spain

Commanders and leaders
(First French Empire) Auguste de Marmont (WIA) (First French Empire) Jean Bonet (WIA) (First French Empire) Bertrand Clauzel	(United Kingdom of Great Britain and Ireland) Arthur Wellesley

Strength
42,000–49,647	46,000–51,949

Casualties and losses
Up to 6,000–10,000 killed or wounded and 7,000 captured Total casualties: 12,000–17,000 killed, wounded or captured	United Kingdom: 3,129 killed or wounded Portugal: 2,038 killed or wounded Spain: 6 killed or wounded Total casualties: 4,800–5,200 killed or wounded

Peninsular War: Spain
current battle
Wellington in command
Wellington not in command

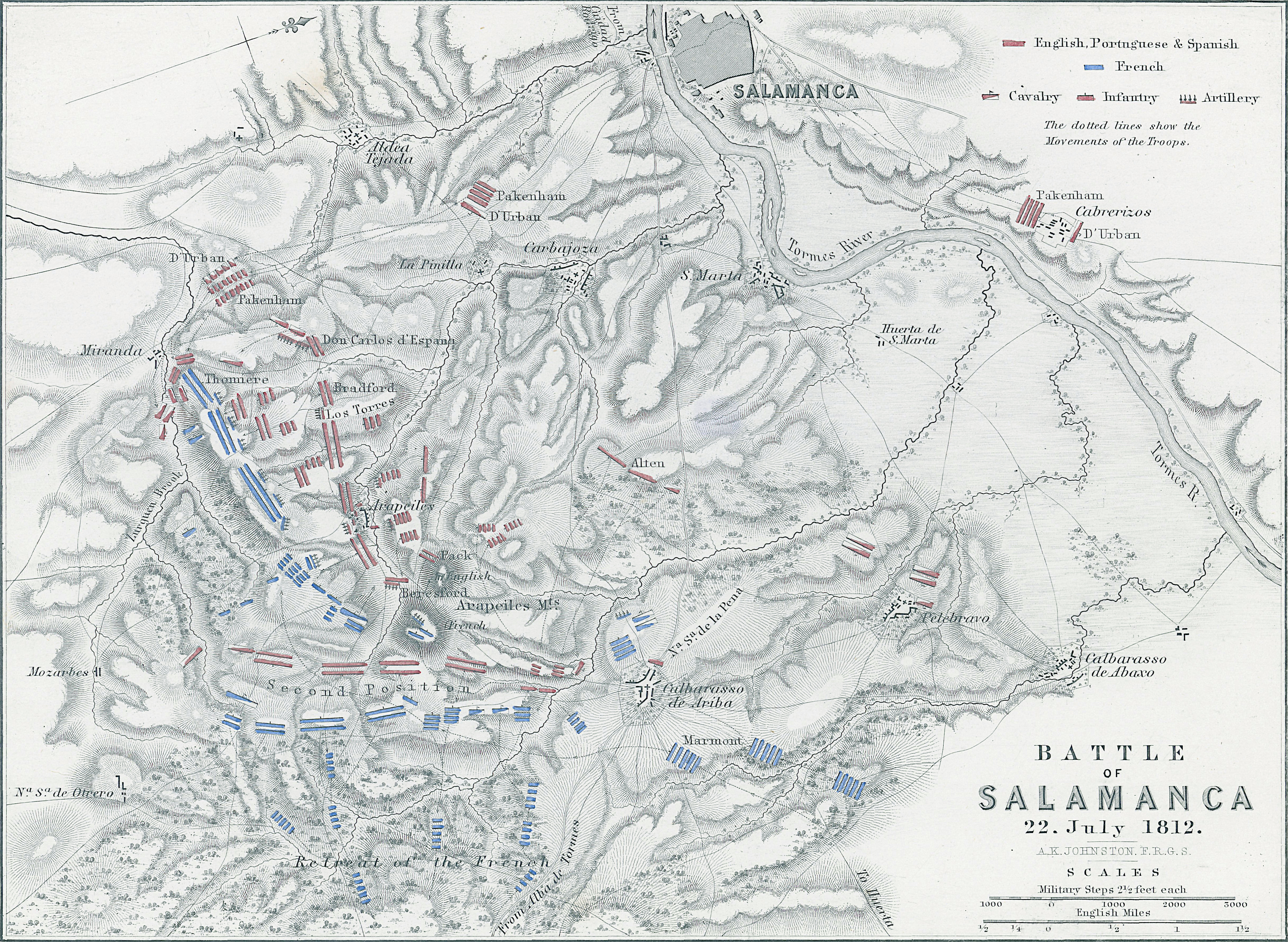
Map of the battlefield

The Battle of Salamanca (in French and Spanish known as the Battle of the Arapiles) took place on 22 July 1812. An Anglo-Portuguese army under the Earl of Wellington (future Duke of Wellington) defeated Marshal Auguste Marmont's French forces at Arapiles, south of Salamanca, Spain, during the Peninsular War. A Spanish division was also present but took no part in the battle.

In his analysis of the Salamanca campaign, author Rory Muir (2001) emphasizes that the quality of Wellington's Anglo-Portuguese Army was moderately superior to Marmont's; this was determined by the Anglo-Portuguese infantry and, notably, cavalry. The difference in the quality of the infantry, however, was "not overwhelming". The French artillery was more numerous – 78 cannon against 62 – but "this was more than offset" by the strength of Wellington's cavalry, both more numerous and more skilled. Good discipline and morale were present in the Anglo-Portuguese Army, which underwent training and reorganization between 1809 and 1812. Constant warfare took its toll on the French soldiers. Their troops at Salamanca were not those professional soldiers of Austerlitz, Jena and Friedland, but they far surpassed most of the "motley horde" Napoleon sent to Russia.

The battle involved a succession of flanking manoeuvres in oblique order, initiated by the British heavy cavalry brigade and Edward Pakenham's 3rd Division and continued by the cavalry and the 4th, 5th and 6th divisions. These attacks resulted in a rout of the French left wing, which was isolated from the rest of the army due to Marmont's tactical error. Marmont and his deputy commander, General Bonet, received shrapnel wounds in the first few minutes of firing. Confusion amongst the French command may have been decisive in creating an opportunity, which Wellington seized. General Bertrand Clauzel, third in seniority, assumed command and ordered a counter-attack by the French reserve toward the depleted Allied centre. The move proved partly successful but with Wellington having sent his reinforcements to the centre, the Anglo-Portuguese forces prevailed. As Muir points out, of all Napoleon's victories, only Austerlitz, Friedland and "possibly" Rivoli can compared to the daring conception and skilful execution of the Battle of Salamanca.

Allied losses numbered 3,129 British, 2,038 Portuguese and 6 Spanish dead or wounded; in total, 5,173. Most of the Spanish troops took no part in the battle as they were positioned to block French escape routes and so suffered just six casualties. The French suffered about 13,000 dead, wounded and captured. As a consequence of Wellington's victory, his army was able to advance to and liberate Madrid for two months, before retreating to Portugal. The French were forced to abandon Andalusia permanently while the loss of Madrid irreparably damaged King Joseph's pro-French government.

== Background ==
In April 1812, following the successful Siege of Badajoz during the allied campaign in Spain, Wellington and the greater part of the Anglo-Portuguese army marched north to expel Marmont's French army who had temporarily invaded Portugal. Following Marmont's retreat to Salamanca Wellington took position behind the Agueda and Coa rivers. In May, acting on Wellington's orders General Hill took a force of 7,000 men to destroy the bridge at Almaraz, breaking the only direct communications between Soult's and Marmont's armies.

On 13 June, Wellington crossed the Agueda and advanced eastward to Salamanca, a town that was a major supply depot for the French army. The French had converted three convents into powerful forts to defend the town and the bridge across the river Tormes. On 19 June the first battery opened fire but it was not until 27 June that, with two of the convents battered and in flames and with no sign of relief, the French troops asked for surrender terms.

For several weeks Wellington found his movements north of Salamanca blocked by Marmont's army, which constantly swelled with reinforcements. With the armies often marching close together, separated by the river, and Marmont repeatedly threatening Wellington's supply line. Moving east, the French crossed to the south bank of the Tormes across another bridge at Huerta and by marching south then west hoped to turn the flank of Wellington's army.

Preceding the battle a letter from Wellington to Castanos was intercepted, stating Wellington's inability to hold his positions. This caused Marmont to try and force a battle, exaggerating his flanking attempt.

By the day of the battle Wellington had decided to withdraw his army all the way back to Portugal, but observed that with the two armies marching parallel to each other, with the British on the inside line, the French became strung out and Marmont had made the tactical error of separating his left flank from the main body of his army. The Duke immediately ordered the major part of his army to attack the overextended French left wing.

=== Forces ===
Marshal Marmont's 50,000-man Army of Portugal contained eight infantry and two cavalry divisions, plus 78 artillery pieces. The infantry divisions were Maximilien Sébastien Foy's 1st (4,900), Bertrand Clauzel's 2nd (6,300), Claude François Ferey's 3rd (5,400), Jacques Thomas Sarrut's 4th (5,000), Antoine Louis Popon de Maucune's 5th (5,000), Antoine François Brenier de Montmorand's 6th (4,300), Jean Guillaume Barthélemy Thomières's 7th (4,300), and Jean Pierre François Bonet's 8th (6,400). Pierre François Xavier Boyer led 1,500 dragoons and Jean-Baptiste Theodore Curto commanded 1,900 light cavalry. Louis Tirlet directed 3,300 artillerymen and there were also 1,300 engineers, military police and wagon drivers.

Wellington's 48,500-man army included eight infantry divisions, formed mainly by British and Portuguese units (also German and one of French royalists), and two independent brigades, five cavalry brigades and 54 cannons (without Spanish cannons). The infantry divisions were Henry Frederick Campbell's 1st (6,200), Edward Pakenham's 3rd (5,800), Lowry Cole's 4th (5,191), James Leith's 5th (6,700), Henry Clinton's 6th (5,500), John Hope's 7th (5,100) and Charles Alten's Light (3,500). Carlos de España commanded a 3,400-man Spanish division, while Denis Pack (2,600) and Thomas Bradford (1,900) led the independent Portuguese brigades.

Stapleton Cotton supervised the cavalry brigades. These included 1,000 British heavy dragoons (1st Cavalry Brigade) led by John Le Marchant, 1,000 British light dragoons (2nd Cavalry Brigade) under George Anson, 700 Anglo-German light horse under Victor Alten, 800 King's German Legion (KGL) heavy dragoons led by Eberhardt Otto George von Bock and 500 Portuguese dragoons under Benjamin d'Urban. Hoylet Framingham commanded eight British (RHA: Ross, Bull, Macdonald; RA: Lawson's, Gardiner, Greene, Douglas, May) and one Portuguese (Arriaga) six-gun artillery batteries.

== Battle ==
=== Manoeuvres ===
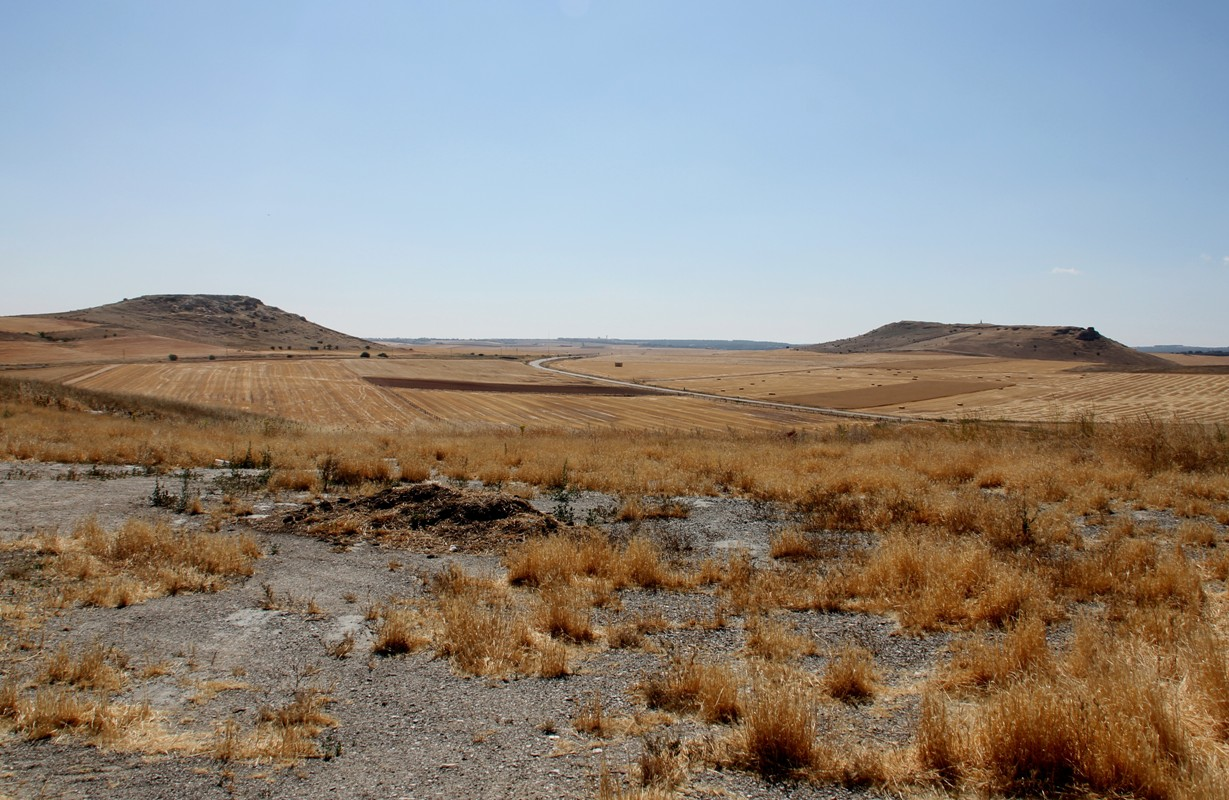
Seen from the village, the Greater Arapile (Arapil Grande) is on the right.

Marmont's army moved south early on 22 July, its leading elements reaching an area southeast of Salamanca. To the west, the Marshal could see Wellington's 7th Division deployed on a ridge. Spotting a dust cloud in the distance, Marmont assumed that most of the British army was in retreat and that he faced only a rearguard. He planned to move his French army south, then west to turn the British right flank. The battlefield had several breaks and hollows, limiting the French Army's sight of the Allied Army. This was a mistake as Wellington had most of his forces hidden behind the ridge, while his 3rd and 5th divisions were en route from Salamanca. Wellington had planned to retreat if outflanked, but waited to see if Marmont would make a blunder.

The Marshal's army planned to move along an L-shaped ridge, with its angle near a steep height known as the Greater Arapile. That morning, the French occupied only the short, north-pointing part of the L. For his flanking move, Marmont marched his divisions west along the long side of the L. The Anglo-Allied army lay behind another L-shaped ridge, inside and parallel to the French L, and separated from it by a valley. Unseen by the French, Wellington assembled a powerful striking force along the long side of the British L. As Marmont moved westward, the French became strung out along the long side of the L. Thomières's division led the way, supported by Curto's cavalry. After that, Maucune, Brenier, and Clauzel. Bonet, Sarrut and Boyer advanced close to the Greater Arapile, while Foy and Ferey held the short side of the L.

=== Wellington attacks ===
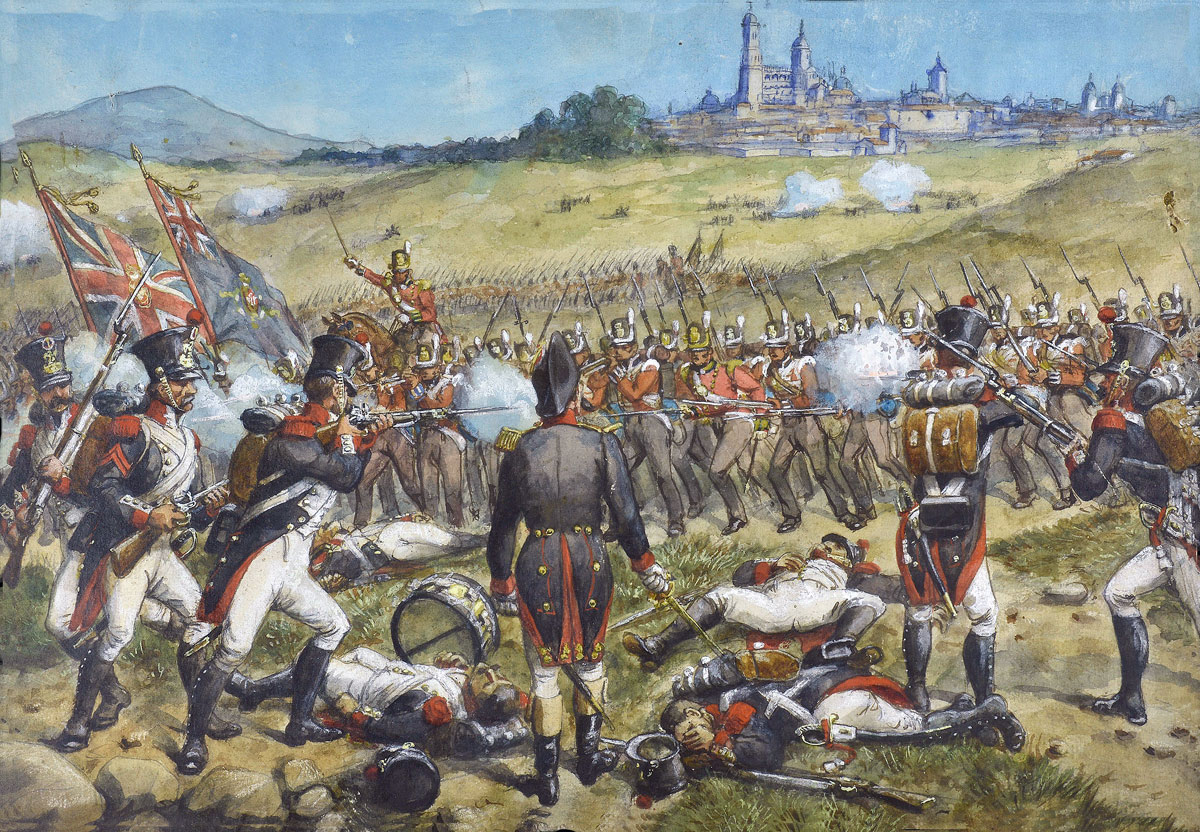
c. 1900 illustration of the battle

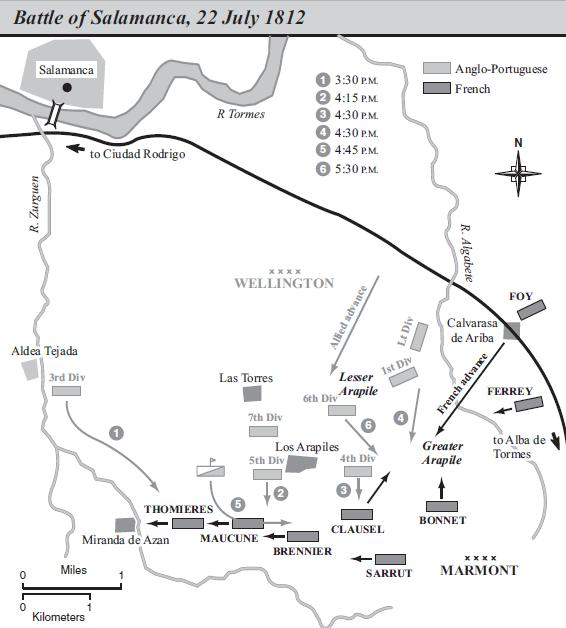
Map of the battle

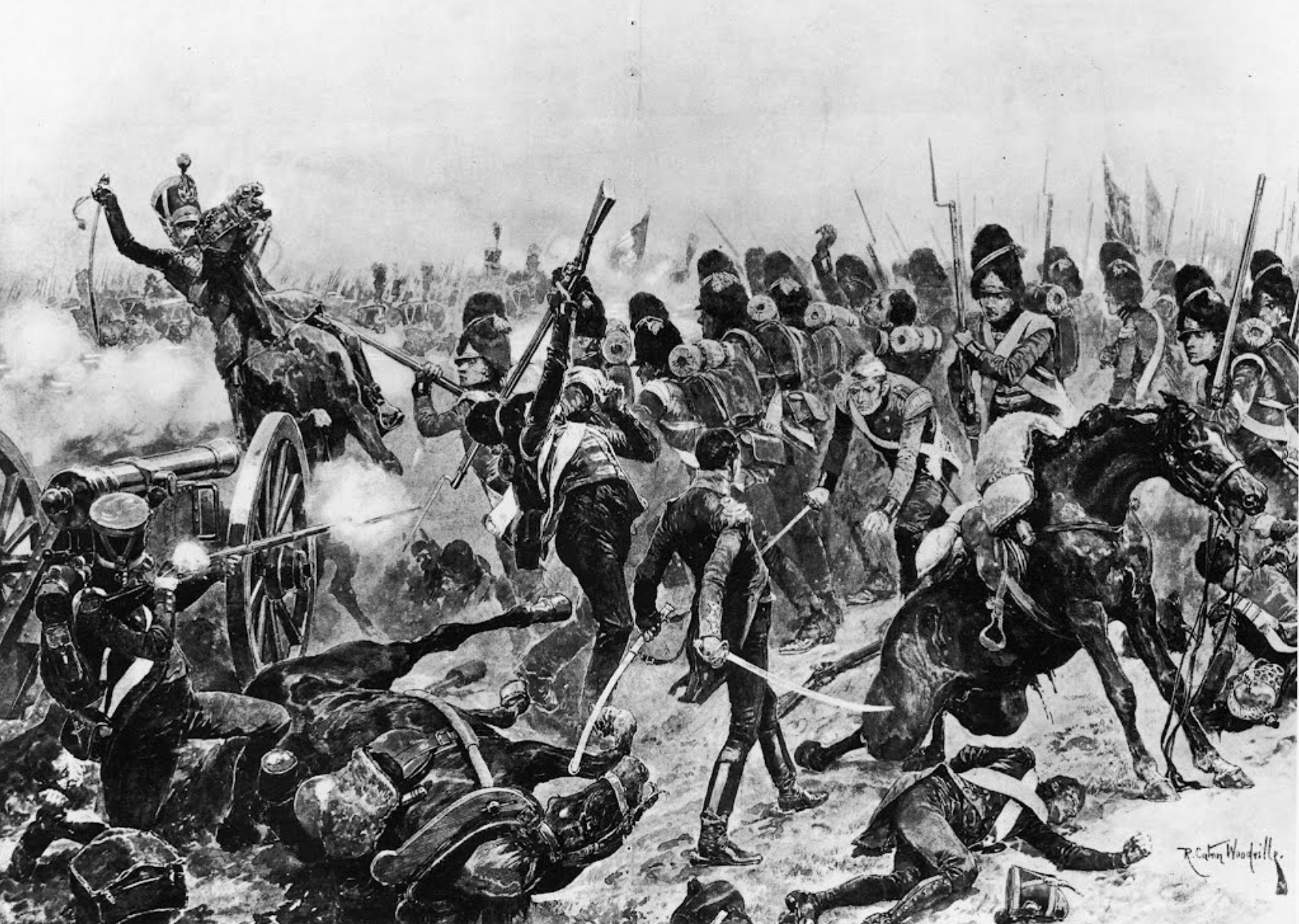
Grenadiers of the 3rd Division charging at French troops during the battle

When the 3rd Division and D'Urban's brigade reached the top of the French L, they attacked Thomières. At the same time, Wellington launched the 5th and 4th divisions, backed by the 7th and 6th divisions, at the long side of the French L.

The 3rd Division came at the head of Thomières's division in a two-deep line. Despite its deployment in column formation, the French division initially repulsed its attackers, but was then routed by a bayonet charge. Thomières was killed. Seeing British cavalry in the area, Maucune formed his division into squares, the standard formation to receive a mounted attack, but a poor choice when defending against infantry. With their two-deep line, Leith's 5th Division easily defeated Maucune in a musketry duel. As the French foot soldiers fell back, Cotton ordered Le Marchant's heavy brigade (5th Dragoon Guards, 3rd and 4th dragoons) to attack them. The left wing of the French army was on the point of being defeated by the 3rd and 5th divisions of Anglo-Portuguese infantry when Le Marchant's dragoons charged in and destroyed battalion after battalion with the heavy cavalrymen's weapon, the sword, an exercise which had been designed by Le Marchant. Many of the French infantrymen sought the protection of the British infantry to escape the sabres of the dragoons. Le Marchant, knowing he had achieved a magnificent success having crushed eight French battalions, was leading a squadron when he was shot in the spine and killed. William Ponsonby succeeded to command of the brigade.

The French army lost its commander very early in the crisis. As Pakenham's 3rd Division prepared to attack Thomières, Marmont finally realized his army's peril. He dashed for his horse, but was caught in a British shellburst which broke his arm and two ribs. His second-in-command, Bonet, was wounded very soon afterwards. Records conflict, however, with Marmont claiming that he was wounded as his wing became overextended, and his incapacitation led to the error not being corrected before Wellington attacked. His enemies place the time of his wounding as during Wellington's attack. For somewhere between 20 minutes and over an hour, the French Army of Portugal remained leaderless. Cole's 4th Division attacked Bonet's division while Pack's Portuguese assaulted the Greater Arapile. With the help of a 40-gun battery firing from the Greater Arapile, both attacks were repulsed by the French.

Assuming command, Clauzel did his best to salvage the dire situation. He committed Sarrut's division to shore up the wrecked left flank, then launched a dangerous counterattack at Cole's 4th Division using his own and Bonet's divisions, supported by Boyer's dragoons. This attack brushed aside Cole's survivors and struck the 6th Division in Wellington's second line. Marshal William Carr Beresford reacted promptly to the developing threat and immediately sent Spry's Portuguese brigade of the 5th Division to engage the French infantry, while Wellington moved the 1st and 7th divisions to assist. After bitter resistance, the divisions of Clauzel and Bonet were defeated and the French army began to retreat.

As the rest of the French army streamed away, Clauzel ordered Ferey to hold off the victorious Allies at all costs. Ferey formed his division in a convex line, following the shape of the hillside. The French infantry had fought in battalion columns that day, but Ferey deployed seven battalions into a three-deep line, with both flanks covered by a battalion in square. The French divisional artillery battery was in close support. With its two British brigades in the front line, Clinton's victorious 6th Division attacked Ferey's division. The first volley of the French soldiers was particularly lethal. The slope was so steep that Ferey's third rank could fire over the heads of the first two ranks. In the gathering dusk, it appeared to the soldiers of Clinton's division that they were attacking a flaming mountain. On the British right flank, Major General Richard Hulse's brigade suffered appalling losses: the 1st/11th Foot lost 340 men out of 516 as casualties while the 1/61st Foot lost 366 out of 546. The French also suffered severe losses and slowly edged backwards until the survivors formed at the edge of the forest. In this position, Ferey was killed by a round shot from the British artillery.

There was a lull as Clinton withdrew his two mauled British brigades and placed Brigadier General Conde de Rezende's Portuguese brigade in the front line for a final attack. The French shot the attacking formation to pieces; the Portuguese brigade reported 487 casualties. Clinton was compelled to replace them with his badly reduced British brigades. By this time the Allied 5th Division was pressing against the French left flank and Ferey's line collapsed from left to right and disappeared into the forest. The French 31st Light Infantry Regiment on the right flank acted as rear guard. Ferey's division lost over 1,100 men in this action. Wellington ordered Clinton to pursue, but his soldiers were completely exhausted. They advanced only 100 yards into the woods and went into bivouac.

=== End ===
Foy's division covered the French retreat towards Alba de Tormes, where there was a bridge they could use to escape. Wellington, believing that the Alba de Tormes crossing was blocked by a Spanish battalion in a fortified castle, directed his pursuit along a different road. España, however, had withdrawn the battalion without informing Wellington, which allowed the French to escape. There are other casualty estimates. The French Army of Portugal suffered up to 7,000 or 10,000 killed and wounded and 7,000 captured. Besides Marmont's severe wounds, two divisional commanders were killed and another wounded. Half of the 5,214 Anglo-Allied losses came from the 4th and 6th divisions. Cotton, Cole, and Leith were all wounded.

== Aftermath ==
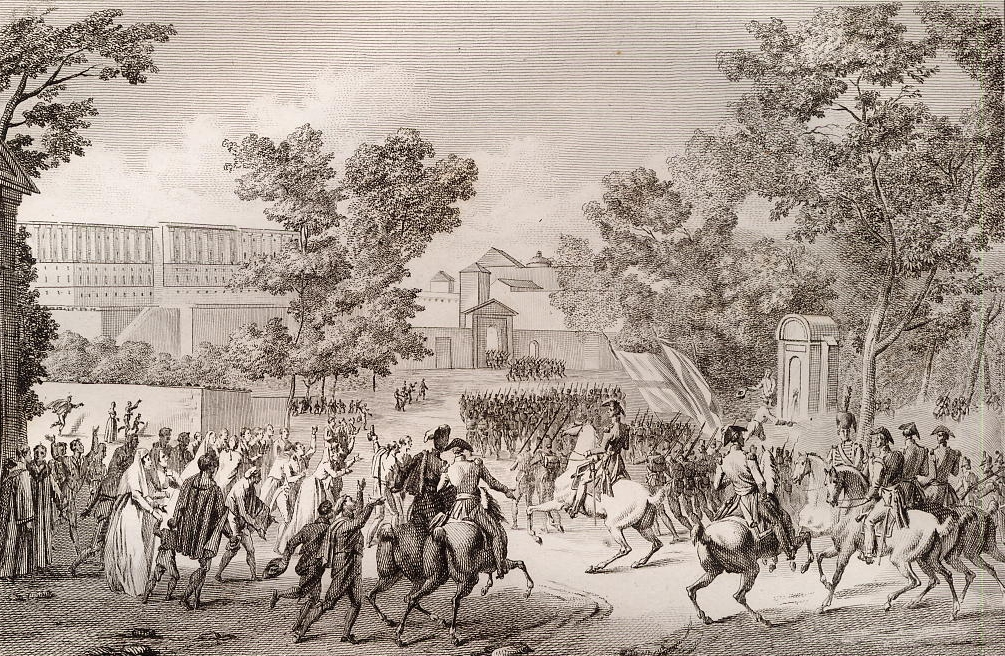
The Anglo-Portuguese Army entering Madrid on 12 August

The Battle of Salamanca was a damaging defeat for the French and while they regrouped, the Anglo-Portuguese Army entered Madrid on 12 August. The Siege of Burgos ensued, then in the autumn the Anglo-Portuguese retreated to Portugal when renewed French concentrations threatened to trap them, although the French forces, which had been stripped of several experienced units to join the Russian campaign, were reluctant to go on the offensive. A failure by Spanish troops to guard a crucial escape route over the bridge at Alba de Tormes tainted the victory. This may have resulted from a misunderstanding between Spanish and British commanders. Subsequent pursuit failed to destroy or to capture the fleeing French.

The battle established Wellington as an offensive general. It was said that he "defeated an army of 40,000 men in 40 minutes." Six days after the battle, Foy wrote in his diary,

"This battle is the most cleverly fought, the largest in scale, the most important in results, of any that the English have won in recent times. It brings up Lord Wellington's reputation almost to the level of that of Marlborough. Up to this day we knew his prudence, his eye for choosing good positions, and the skill with which he used them. But at Salamanca he has shown himself a great and able master of manoeuvring. He kept his dispositions hidden nearly the whole day: he allowed us to develop our movement before he pronounced his own: he played a close game: he utilized the oblique order in the style of Frederick the Great."

Two French Imperial Eagles were captured at Salamanca. It has traditionally been claimed that Ensign John Pratt of the 2/30th Foot's light company took the eagle of the 22nd Line Infantry Regiment, which is currently on display in the Lancashire Infantry Museum in Preston, Lancashire. However, the claim that Pratt captured the eagle is disputed, with Chichester William Crookshank claiming in 1816 that it was taken by the 12 Caçadores Battalion, which he led during the battle. The historian Garry David Wills argued that Crookshank's claim was correct, noting that Pratt himself never claimed to have captured the eagle. In 1912, Edward Fraser published The War Drama of the Eagles, which claimed Pratt captured the 22nd's eagle in an account which contained "several errors and is contradicted by the history of the 44th Foot". Wills further argued that the claim that Pratt captured the 22nd's eagle originated from Fraser's "erroneous" interpretation of 19th-century sources. The eagle of the 62nd Line Infantry Regiment was captured by Lieutenant Pearce of the 2/44th Foot, which was part of the 5th Division. It is currently on display at the Essex Regiment Museum in Chelmsford, Essex. Three terracotta statues representing the captured eagles sit between the high pointed gables of Essex House in Stratford, London. On 23 July, King's German Legion (KGL) dragoons attacked and overran the French rearguard at the Battle of García Hernández. The KGL broke two infantry squares within a few minutes, inflicting around 1,600 casualties on the French.

=== Legacy ===
Armorial achievement of the Spanish Army's 62nd Regiment of Infantry "Arapiles". King Edward VII's cypher and the name of the British Army unit that played a prominent role in the Battle of Salamanca were added at the beginning of the Peninsular War Centenary (1908).

- 22 July is known as Salamanca Day and is the regimental day for The Rifles.
- The battle is mentioned in Tolstoy's novel War and Peace, Book 10 Chapter XXVI. Prior to the Battle of Borodino, Tolstoy describes Napoleon as receiving an aide-de-camp, Fabvier, who has just arrived with news of the Battle of Salamanca. "Fabvier told him of the heroism and devotion of his troops fighting at Salamanca, at the other end of Europe, but with one thought – to be worthy of their Emperor – but with one fear – to fail to please him. The result of that battle had been deplorable. Napoleon made ironic remarks during Fabvier's account, as if he had not expected that matters could not go otherwise in his absence".
- The battle features in Sharpe's Sword by Bernard Cornwell, in which Richard Sharpe helps Wellington bring the French to battle by feeding a known French spy false information. Cornwell also duplicated Wellington's tactics at Salamanca in his retelling of Arthur's victory at the Battle of Mount Badon, in Excalibur, the third and final volume of Cornwell's The Warlord Chronicles.
- The battle is described in Suzanna Clarke's Jonathan Strange and Mr. Norrell, during the time that Jonathan Strange served under Lord Wellington.
- Salamanca Place, in Hobart, Tasmania, commemorates the battle. Mount Wellington is nearby.
- A mock-up of the battle is featured in episode 6, season 2 of the TV series The Crown, "Vergangenheit".
- Benito Pérez Galdós's novel La Batalla de los Arapiles, part of his series Episodios Nacionales features the battle extensively.
- The Spanish Bride, by Georgette Heyer.
- Higgins attempts unsuccessfully to reenact the battle at the beginning of episode 15, season 5 of the TV series Magnum, P.I. but is thwarted by Magnum's unwelcome improvisation.
- Chapter 25, The Raid, of Watership Down has "'By Frith, that'll do,' said Blackberry, for all the world like the Duke of Wellington at Salamanca. "

Preceded by Battle of Ekau	Napoleonic Wars; Battle of Salamanca	Succeeded by Battle of García Hernández
