= Jean Guillaume Barthélemy Thomières =

French Army officer (1771-1812)

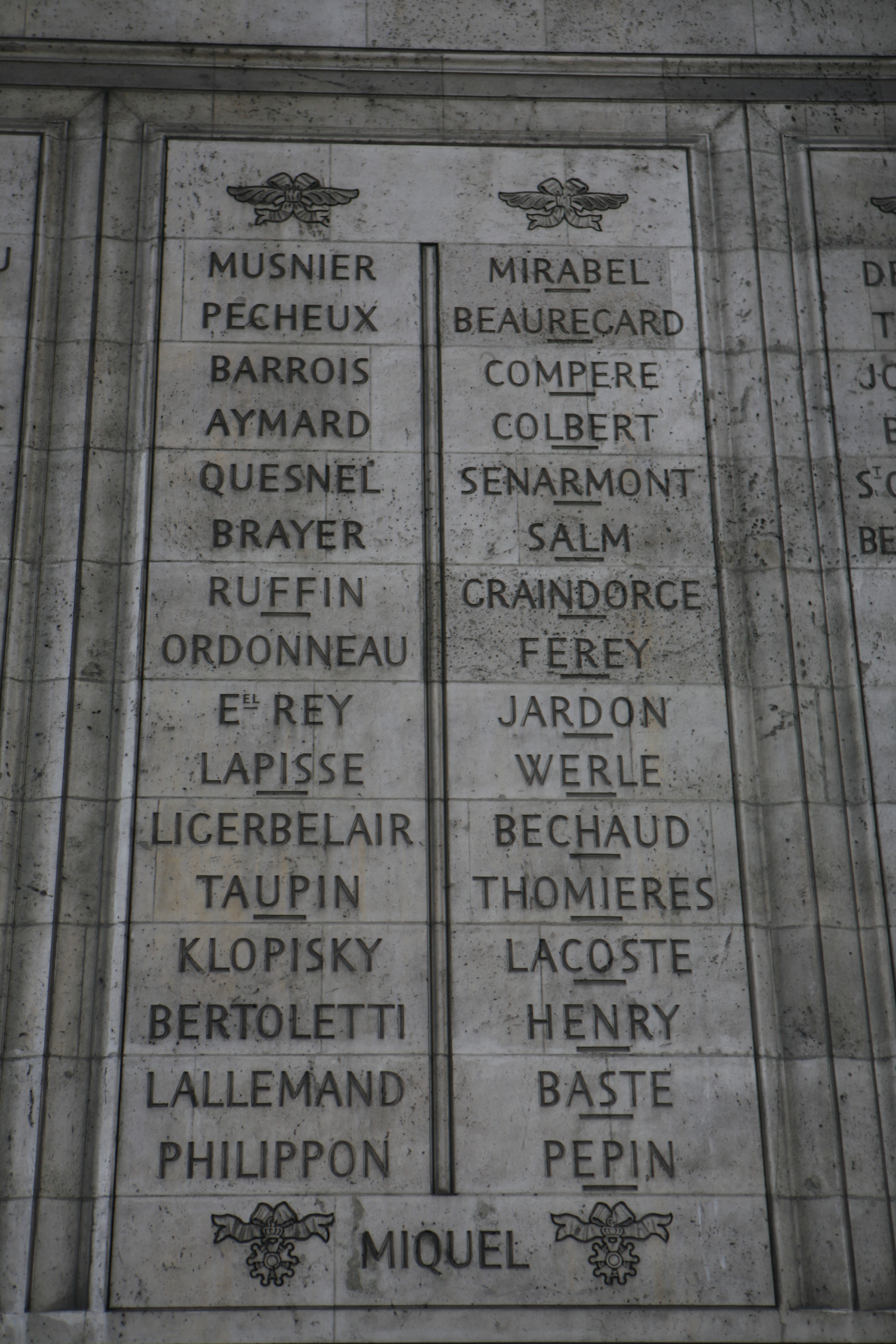
- Thomieres' name (fifth from bottom) on Column 38 of the Arc de Triomphe
- Born: 18 August 1771; Sérignan, France
- Died: 22 July 1812 (aged 40) Arapiles, Salamanca
- Allegiance: French First Republic; First French Empire
- Branch: French Revolutionary Army; French Imperial Army
- Service years: 1793–1812
- Rank: Brigade general
- Conflicts: War of the First Coalition; War of the Pyrenees; Second Battle of Dego; Battle of Mondovì; Battle of Lodi; Battle of Bassano; Battle of Arcole; War of the Second Coalition; Battle of Montebello (1800); Battle of Marengo; War of the Fourth Coalition; Peninsular War; Invasion of Portugal (1807); Battle of Roliça; Battle of Vimeiro; Battle of Corunna; Battle of Bussaco; Battle of Fuentes de Oñoro; Battle of Salamanca †
- Awards: Legion of Honour

Brigade-General Jean Guillaume Barthélemy Thomières (French pronunciation: [ʒɑ̃ ɡijom baʁtelemi tɔmjɛʁ]; 18 August 1771 – 22 July 1812) was a French Army officer who served in the French Revolutionary and Napoleonic Wars. He spent most of his career as a staff officer and before being given command of a brigade during the Peninsular War, where he was killed in action at the Battle of Salamanca. Thomières is one of the names inscribed under the Arc de Triomphe.

== Military career ==
Thomières joined the French Revolutionary Army on 1 January 1793 in the 5th Volunteer Battalion of Hérault and fought against the Spanish in the War of the Pyrenees. Thomières would be elected captain of the battalion in May that year. His battalion would be amalgamated eventually becoming part of the 18th Light.

Thomières was made aide-de-camp to General Jean-Joseph Lamy de Boisconteau [Fr] in July 1793 before being promoted to assistant to the General Staff of the Army of the Eastern Pyrenees in February 1794. In these roles Thomières would take part in the battles of Peyrestortes, Boulou, Céret, San Lorenzo de la Muga, Siege of Roses and the Fluvia.

Thomières transferred to the Army of Italy in 1796 as assistant to General of Brigade François Lanusse and was present at the battles of Second Dego, Mondovì, Lodi, Bassano, and Arcole. In 1800 he fought at the battles of Montebello and Marengo as an aide-de-camp to General Claude Perrin Victor. In 1805 Thomières would join the Grande Armée becoming aide-de-camp to Marshal Jean Lannes in the Reserve Corps in 1806 and would see action in Prussia and Poland.

He was promoted to general officer as General of Brigade in July 1807 and would receive his first major command within 2nd division (Louis Henri Loison's) part of the Gironde observation corps [Fr] under General Jean-Andoche Junot as part of the 1807 invasion of Portugal. On 21 August 1808 he was wounded while leading his brigade at the Battle of Vimeiro.

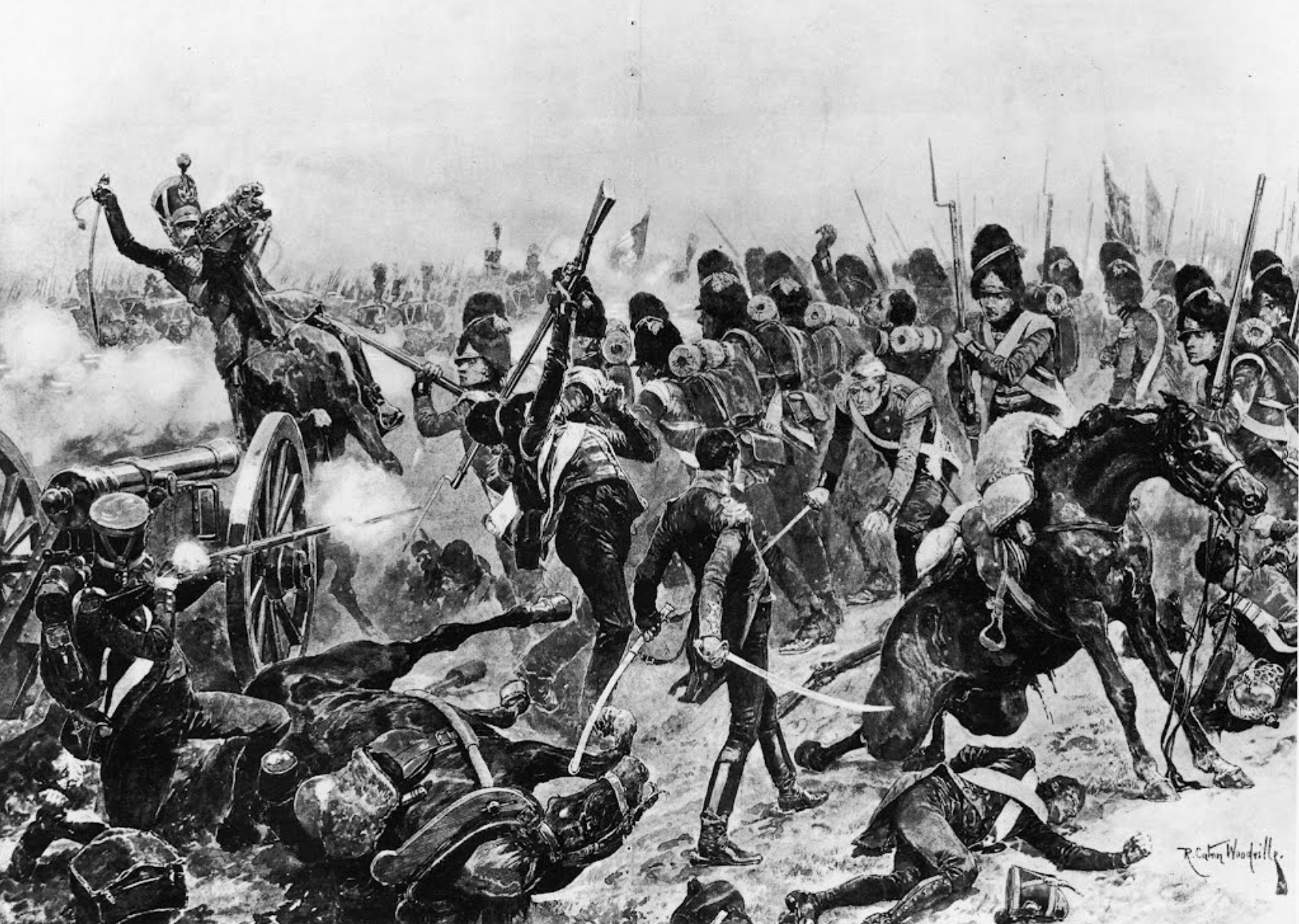
Charge of Pakenham's Third Division (Richard Caton Woodville Jr., 1890)

Thomières would continue to lead different brigades at the battles of Corunna, Bussaco, and Fuentes de Oñoro. He was killed in action at Salamanca where he was provisionally leading the 7th Division in the Army of Portugal. Ordered by Marshal Auguste de Marmont to attempt to cut off the (wrongly assumed to be retreating) Anglo-Portuguese Army, Thomières's division became strung out on the march. With hills obstructing the view of Edward Pakenham's 3rd (UK) Division forming to attack them, Thomières's division was taken by surprise as it crested a hill - expecting to see the allied army in retreat. Instead, they were met with a crossfire as two batteries of artillery, placed on the summit of the western heights opened up at the lead elements. And then were charged by Pakenham's concentrated force while two-thirds of the division was at various points behind the point of contact. Thomières died in the initial contact and by the end of the day the division ceased to exist as a cohesive fighting force.

=== Honours and legacy ===
- France: Officer of the Legion of Honour., 17th of April, 1807
- France: Baron of the Empire, 18th of June 1809
- Saxony: Grand Cross of the Military Order of St. Henry.

Thomières is one of the names inscribed under the Arc de Triomphe, on Column 38, located on the west side.
