= Jean Pierre François Bonet =

- Jean Pierre François, comte Bonet
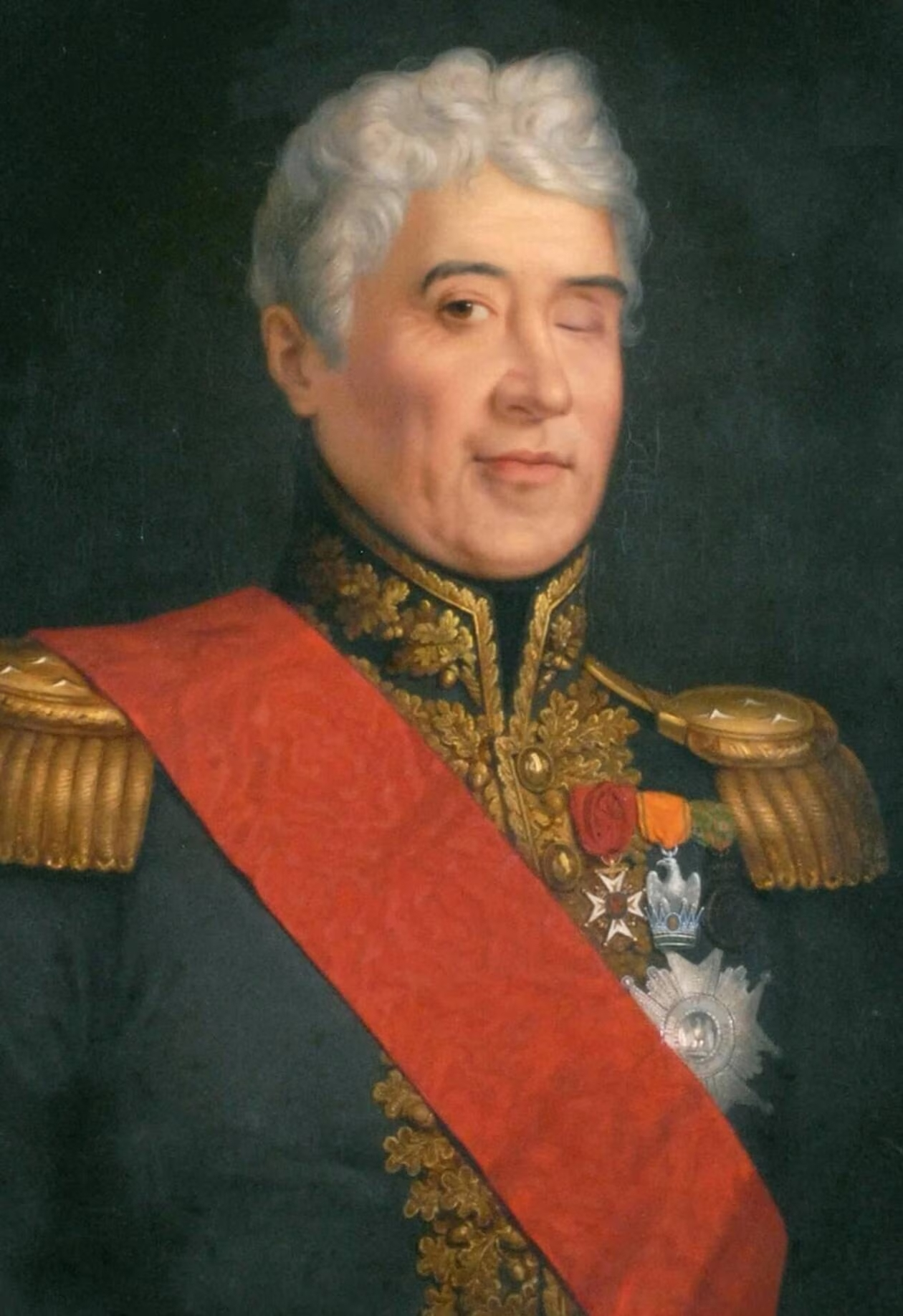
- Born: August 8, 1768; Alençon, France
- Died: November 23, 1857 (aged 89); Alençon, France
- Military career
- Allegiance: France First French Republic; First French Empire First French Empire
- Branch: French Army
- Rank: Général de division
- Conflicts: French Revolutionary Wars; Napoleonic Wars: * Battle of Salamanca
- Awards: Name inscribed under the Arc de Triomphe

Jean Pierre François, comte Bonet (French: [ʒɑ̃ pjɛʁ fʁɑ̃swa bɔnɛ]; Alençon, 8 August 1768 – Alençon, 23 November 1857) was a French military commander during the French Revolutionary Wars and Napoleonic Wars.

During the Peninsular War, Bonet saw action at Gamonal (10 November 1808). Both he and his commanding officer, Marshal Marmont, were wounded by shrapnel at the Battle of Salamanca.

Bonet is among the names of French military leaders inscribed under the Arc de Triomphe.

== Bibliography ==
- Gates, David (1986). The Spanish Ulcer: A History of the Peninsular War. Pimlico 2002. ISBN 0712697306
- Pope, Stephen (1999). The Cassel Dictionary of the Napoleonic Wars. Cassel. ISBN 0-304-35229-2.
- Schneid, Frederick C. (2011). The French Revolutionary and Napoleonic Wars. Mainz: Institute of European History.
