= Jacques Thomas Sarrut =

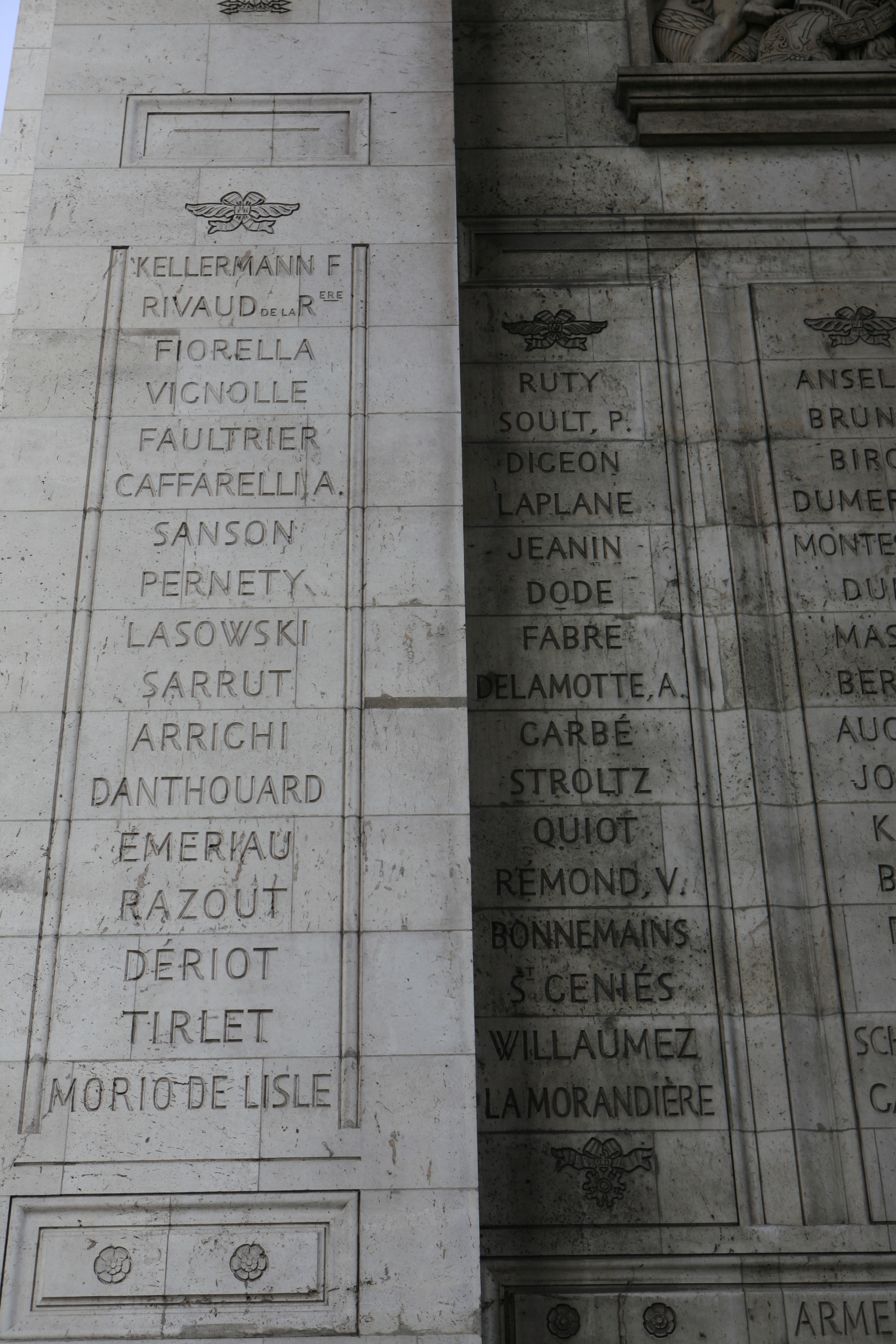
- Sarrut is the tenth name on Column 21 on the Arc de Triomphe
- Born: 16 August 1765; Canté, Ariège, France
- Died: 26 June 1813 (aged 47) Vitoria, Spain
- Allegiance: France
- Branch: Infantry
- Rank: General of Division
- Conflicts: French Revolutionary Wars; Battle of Hohenlinden; Napoleonic Wars; Battle of Jena; Battle of Bussaco; Battle of Fuentes de Oñoro; Battle of Salamanca; Battle of Vitoria
- Awards: Légion d'Honneur, CC, 1804
- Other work: Baron of the Empire, 1810

Jacques Thomas Sarrut (French pronunciation: [ʒak tɔmɑ saʁy]; 16 August 1765 – 26 June 1813) joined the French army and became a division commander in the First French Empire of Napoleon. He led a regiment at Hohenlinden, a brigade at Jena, Bussaco, and Fuentes de Oñoro, and a division at Salamanca. He was mortally wounded while leading his soldiers against the Anglo-Allied army at the Battle of Vitoria. Sarrut is one of the names inscribed under the Arc de Triomphe on Column 21.

== Revolution ==
Sarrut was born on 16 August 1765 at Canté in what is now the department of Ariège, France, which is on the border with Spain. He became Chef de Brigade (colonel) of the 3rd Demi-Brigade de bataille on 28 May 1794. He transferred to command of the 8th Infantry Demi-Brigade on 19 February 1796. That year the 8th was serving with the Army of the North, but in 1797 the unit transferred to the Army of Germany. In 1798, the demi-brigade switched between the Army of Mainz, the Army of the Danube, and the Army of the Rhine. At the Battle of Hohenlinden on 3 December 1800, the 8th Demi-Brigade with a strength of 2,680 men was part of Antoine Richepanse's division.

== Empire ==
On 15 July 1811, Sarrut's division of the Army of Portugal counted 4,922 men present. The division consisted of three battalions each of the 2nd Light, 4th Light, and 36th Line Infantry Regiments.
