= Auguste de Marmont =

French Marshal (1774–1852)

Marshal of the Empire Auguste de Marmont Duke of Ragusa
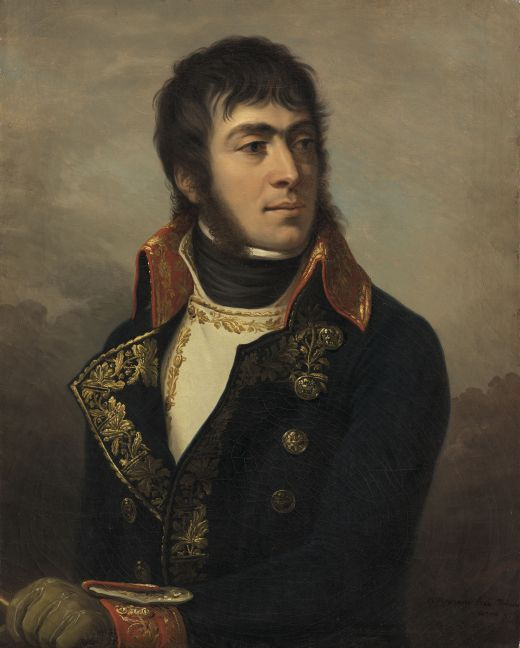
- Portrait by Andrea Appiani, 1798
- Born: 20 July 1774; Châtillon-sur-Seine, France
- Died: 22 March 1852 (aged 77); Venice, Kingdom of Lombardy–Venetia
- Military career
- Branch: French Army
- Rank: Marshal of the Empire
- Conflicts: French Revolutionary Wars; • Toulon; • Italy 1796–97; • Egypt and Syria; • Marengo; Napoleonic Wars; • Ulm; • Ragusa 1806; • Dalmatia 1809; • Graz; • Wagram; • Znaim; • Salamanca; • Germany 1813 (Lützen, Bautzen, Dresden, Leipzig); • North-east France (Six Days, Gué-à-Tresmes, Laon, Fère-Champenoise, Paris)
- Awards: Grand Cross of the Legion of Honour

Auguste Frédéric Louis Viesse de Marmont, duc de Raguse (English: /mɑːrˈmɒ̃/ mar-MOHN, French: [oɡyst fʁedeʁik lwi vjɛs də maʁmɔ̃]; 20 July 1774 – 22 March 1852) was a French general and nobleman who rose to the rank of Marshal of the Empire and was awarded the title Duke of Ragusa (French: duc de Raguse). In the Peninsular War, Marmont succeeded the disgraced André Masséna as commander of the French army in northern Spain but lost decisively at the Battle of Salamanca as France ultimately lost the war in Spain.

At the close of the War of the Sixth Coalition, Marmont went over to the Restoration and remained loyal to the Bourbons through the Hundred Days. This gave Marmont a reputation as a traitor among the remaining Bonapartists, and in French society more broadly. He led the royalist Paris garrison during the July Revolution in 1830, but his efforts proved incapable of quelling the revolution, leading King Charles X to accuse Marmont of betraying the Bourbons as he had betrayed Napoleon.

Marmont departed France with Charles's entourage and never returned to France. Spending his exile mostly in Vienna and other lands of the Austrian Empire, he died in Venice in 1852.

== Early life and career ==
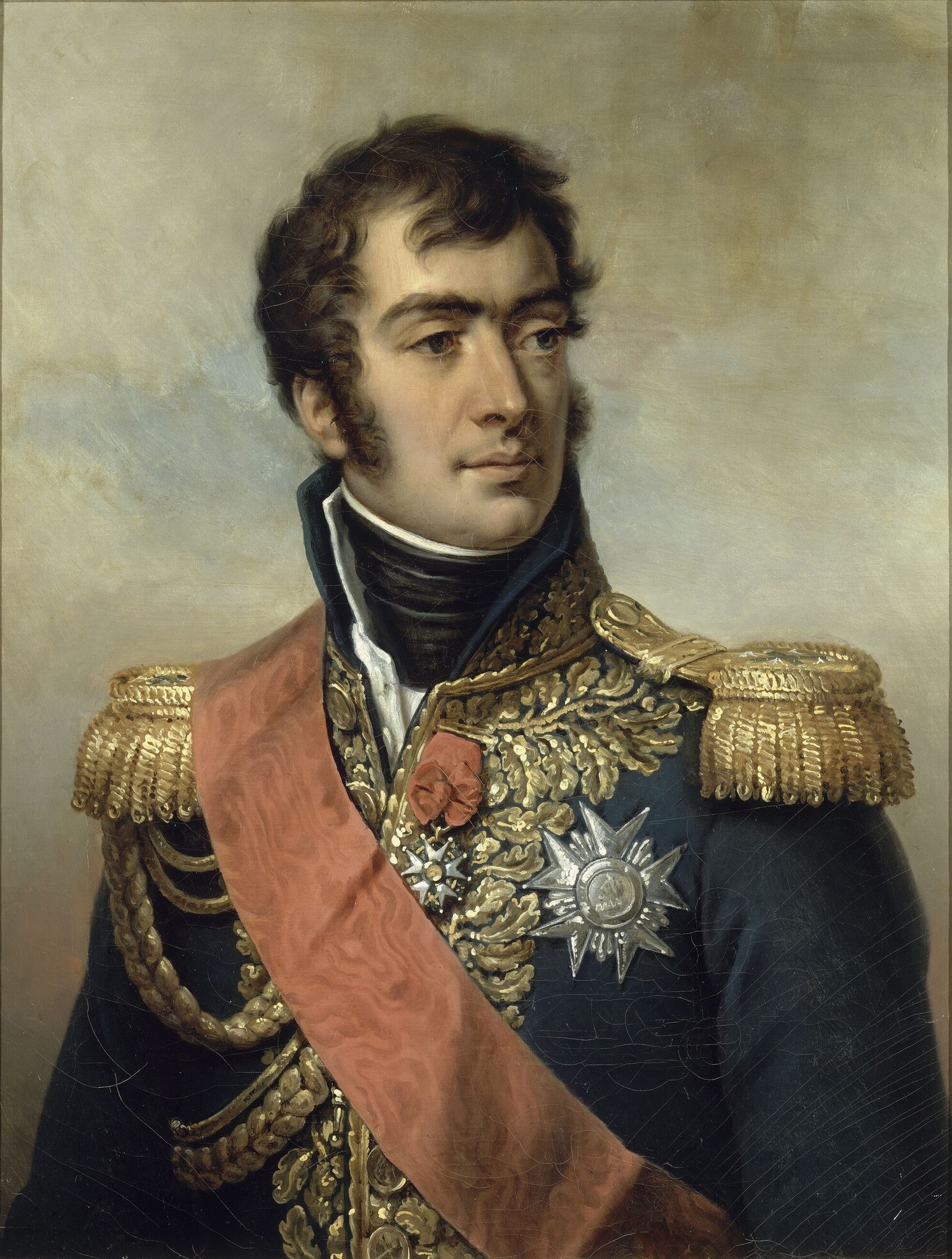
Marmont as Marshal of the Empire, by Jean-Baptiste Paulin Guérin (1837)

Marmont was born at Châtillon-sur-Seine, the son of an ex-officer in the army who belonged to the petite noblesse and adopted the principles of the Revolution. In his memoirs, Marmont claimed to have been taught how to read as a boy using the Compte rendu of Jacques Necker. His love of soldiering soon showed itself, and his father took him to Dijon to learn mathematics before entering the artillery. There, he made the acquaintance of Napoleon Bonaparte, which he renewed after obtaining his commission when he served in Toulon.

The acquaintance ripened into intimacy; Marmont became General Bonaparte's aide-de-camp, remained with him during his disgrace and accompanied him to Italy and Egypt, winning distinction and promotion to general of brigade. In 1799, he returned to Europe with his chief. He was present at the coup d'état of the 18th Brumaire and organized the artillery for the expedition to Italy, which he commanded with great effect at Marengo. For this, he was at once made general of division. In 1801, he became inspector-general of artillery, and in 1804, grand officer of the Legion of Honour. However, he was greatly disappointed at being omitted from the list of officers who were made marshals.

== Napoleonic Wars ==
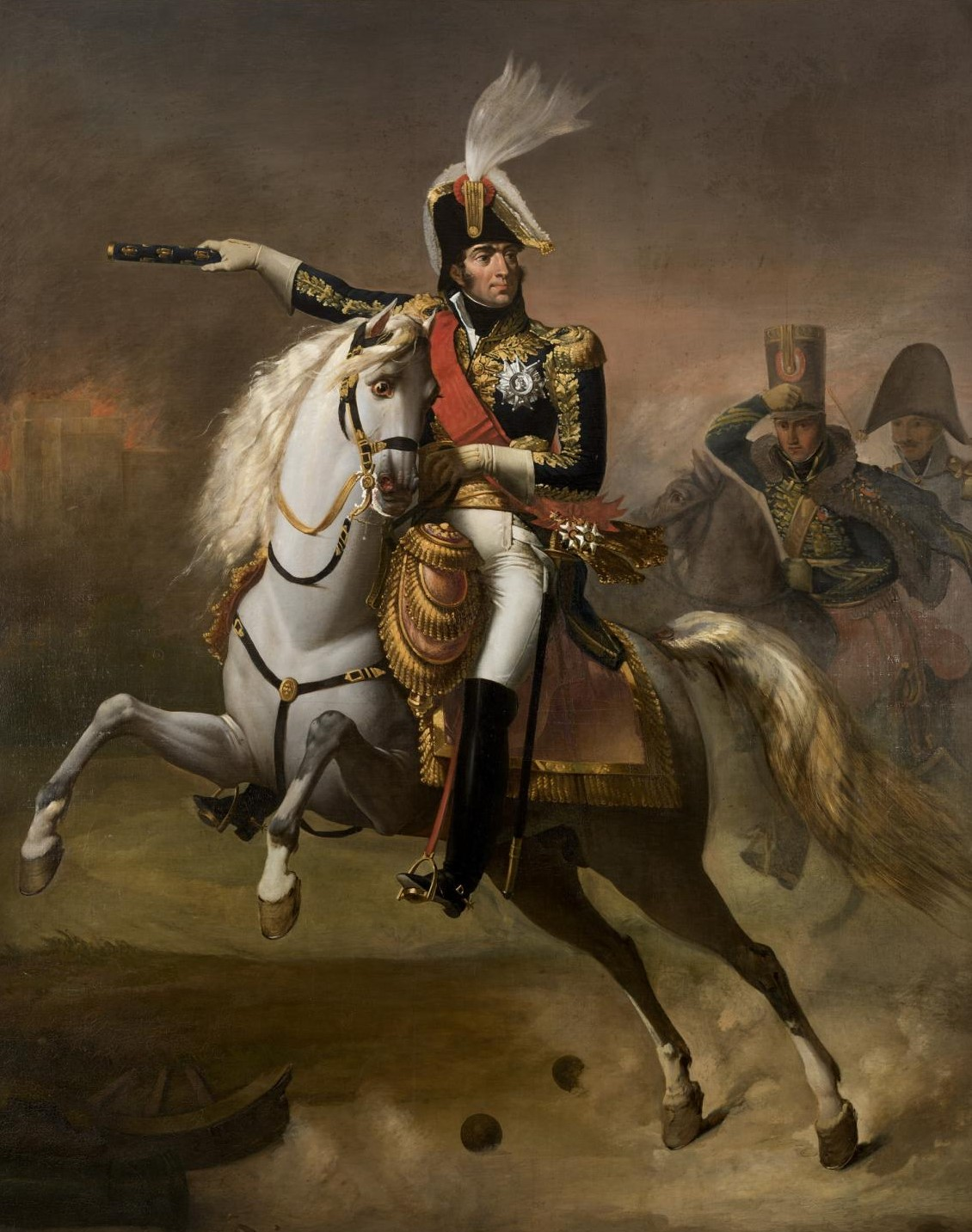
Equestrian portrait of Marmont

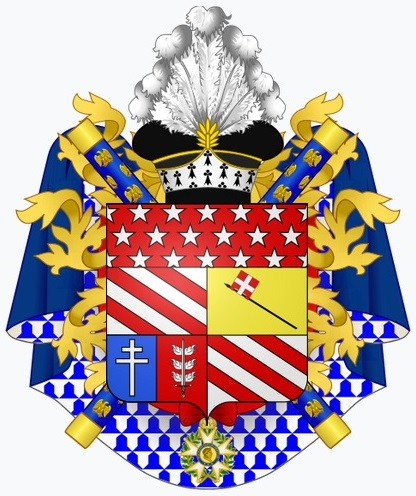
Heraldic achievement of Auguste-Frédéric-Louis Viesse de Marmont, Duke of Ragusa

In 1805, he received the command of a corps, with which he did good service at Ulm. He was then directed to take possession of Dalmatia with his army and occupied the Republic of Ragusa. For the next five years, he was military and civil governor of Dalmatia, and traces of his beneficent régime still survive both in great public works and in the memories of the people. In 1808, he was made Duke of Ragusa.

In the War of the Fifth Coalition, he defeated an Austrian holding force in the Dalmatian Campaign of May 1809 and captured the opposing commander. Breaking out of Dalmatia, he reached Ljubljana (Laibach) in early June. After he defeated Ignaz Gyulai's corps in the Battle of Graz, Napoleon summoned the XI Corps to Vienna. Marmont arrived in time to fight in the Battle of Wagram on 5 and 6 July. In the subsequent pursuit of Archduke Charles, Marmont's corps was in a compromising position and was rescued only by the arrival of Napoleon with heavy reinforcements. Napoleon made him a Marshal of the Empire, though he said, "Between ourselves, you have not done enough to justify entirely my choice." Of the three marshals created after Wagram, the French soldiers said,

MacDonald is France's choice
Oudinot is the army's choice
Marmont is friendship's choice.

Marmont was appointed governor-general of all the Illyrian provinces of the empire. This region included the Croatian port city state of Ragusa. In May 1811, Marmont was hastily summoned to succeed Masséna in the command of the French army in northern Spain. Despite the presence of the British army, his relief of Ciudad Rodrigo was a great feat. The manoeuvering which preceded the Battle of Salamanca was not successful, however, as Wellington ordered his cavalry to charge Marmont's unsuspecting left flank in the battle and inflicted a great defeat on the French. Marmont and his deputy commander Comte Jean-Pierre François Bonet were both struck by shrapnel very early in the battle. Marmont was gravely wounded in the right arm and side, and command of the battle passed to Bertrand Clauzel. He retired to France to recover.

In April 1813, Napoleon again gave Marmont the command of a corps, which he led at the battles of Lützen, Bautzen and Dresden. He then fought throughout the great defensive campaign of 1814 until the last battle before Paris. Marmont's forces fought a fighting retreat back to the commanding position of Essonne, inflicting high casualties on the enemy.

Marmont then took upon himself a political role, seeking to halt what he now saw as a pointless prolonging of a war that France would now assuredly lose. Marmont contacted the Allies and reached a secret agreement with them. As the Allies closed on Montmartre, Marmont—together with marshals Mortier and Moncey—marched to a position where they were quickly surrounded by Allied troops and then surrendered their forces.

== Bourbon service ==
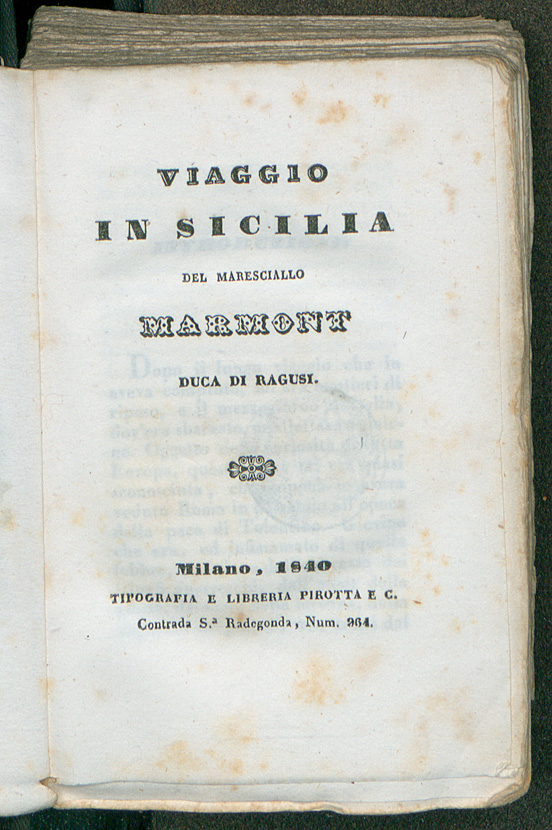
Viaggio in Sicilia, 1840

Marmont stayed loyal to the restored Bourbon king Louis XVIII during the Hundred Days, and following Waterloo, voted in favour of the execution of Marshal Ney.

He was made a Peer of France and a major-general of the Royal Guard, and in 1820, a knight of the Order of the Holy Spirit and a grand officer of the Order of Saint Louis. He was the major-general of the guard on duty in July 1830 during the July Revolution and was ordered to put down with a strong hand any opposition to the July Ordinances. Himself opposed to the court policy, he nevertheless tried to do his duty and only gave up the attempt to suppress the revolution when it became clear that his troops were outmatched. This brought more obloquy upon him, and Charles X even ordered him arrested, saying:

Will you betray us, as you betrayed him?

Marmont accompanied the king into exile and forfeited his marshalate. His desire to return to France was never gratified and he wandered in central and eastern Europe, settling finally in Vienna, where he was well received by the Austrian government. Strangely, he was made tutor to the Duke of Reichstadt, the young man who had once for a few weeks been styled Napoleon II. Despite his long friendship with Napoleon, by this time the verb "raguser"—derived from his title, the Duke of Ragusa—was a household word in France that meant "to betray". Thirty years later, as an old man living in Venice, little children in the street would point and say, "There goes the man who betrayed Napoleon." He died in Venice in March 1852, the last living Napoleonic marshal.

== Works ==
In his last years, Marmont spent much of his time working on his Mémoires, which are of great value to the military history of the time.

His works are:

- Voyage en Hongrie, etc. (4 vols., 1837)
- Voyage en Sicile (1838); trans. it., Milan, 1840
- Esprit des institutions militaires (1845)
- Cesar; Xenophon; and Mémoires (8 vols., published after his death in 1856)

== Family ==
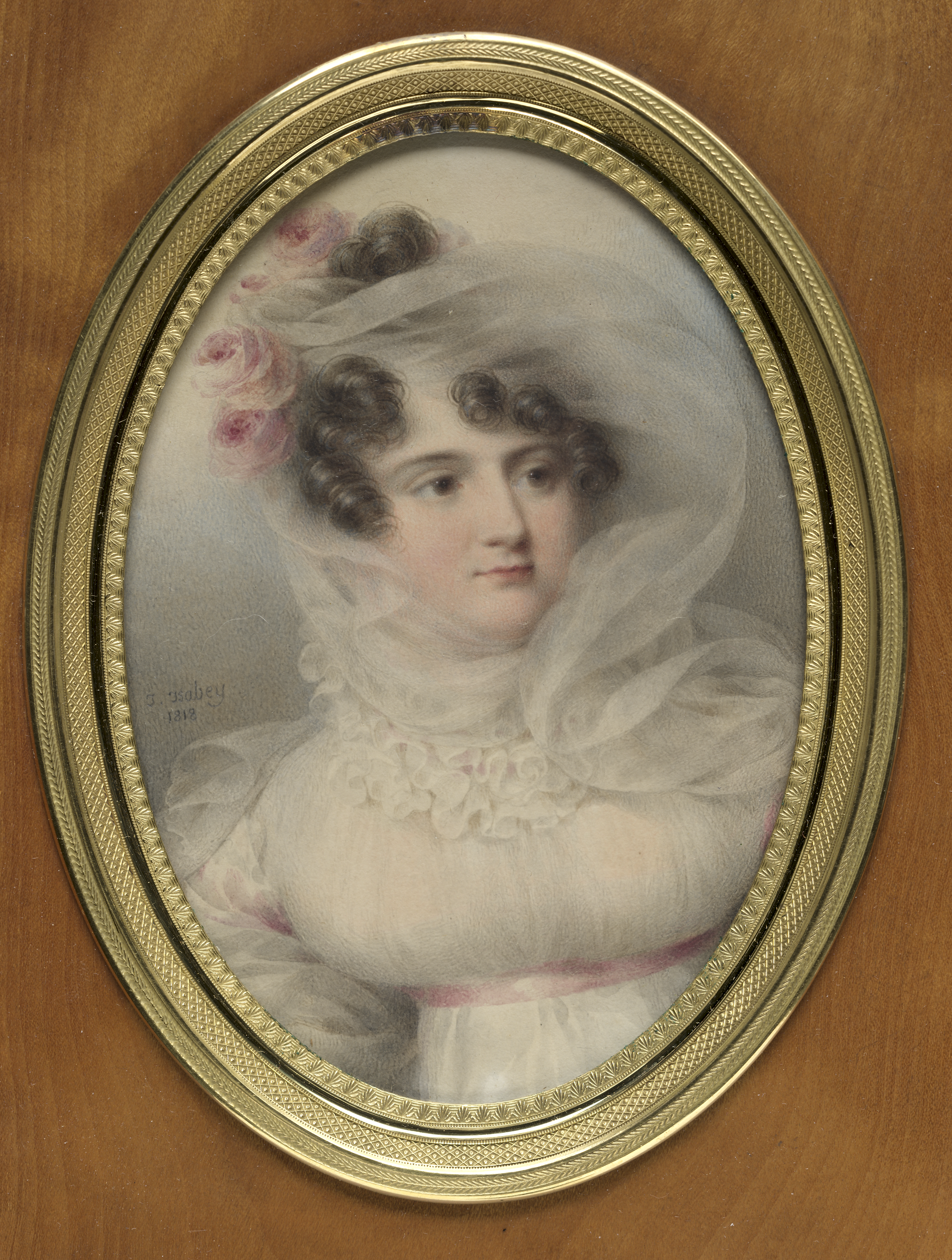
Portrait of Anne-Marie-Hortense Perregaux, Duchess of Ragusa, 1818

In 1798, Marmont married Anne-Marie-Hortense Perregaux, the daughter of Jean-Frédéric Perregaux, a Swiss (and Protestant) banker, later a founder and regent of the Banque de France, and Adélaïde de Praël de Surville, herself the natural daughter of the banker to the court of Louis XV, Nicolas Beaujon. They had no children and were divorced in 1817. She outlived him by five years, dying in Paris in 1857.

== Evaluation ==
Marmont is perhaps one of the most controversial marshals created under the Empire. His reputation, like many French generals in Spain, was tarnished by his defeats in the Peninsular War. However, on the whole, Marmont's military career was quite impressive. He was perhaps the most educated of the marshals and one of the few to write a thesis on the art of war. He was a talented strategist, understanding the art of command and the movement of troops. He performed wonderfully in Dalmatia making what John Elting calls "a remarkable 300-mile march through frequently roadless country, scattering two Austrian forces, but clinging to his independent status..." Perhaps even more impressive is his study and evaluation of the Spanish theater of the war. He studied Wellington's nature of war, refusing to give battle against the British unless the ground was of Marmont's choosing. This led to a series of manoeuvres where Marmont frequently had the upper hand. Marmont understood the importance of cooperation in the Peninsula by supporting his fellow marshals. Tactically Marmont was deadly and quick to strike, but prone to sloppiness which caused him his two defeats.

== Sources ==
- Arnold, James R. Napoleon Conquers Austria. Westport, Conn.: Praeger Publishers, 1995. ISBN 0-275-94694-0
- Chandler, David The Campaigns of Napoleon. Macmillan, New York, 1966.
- Fremont-Barnes, Gregory (30 November 2007). "Marmont, Auguste Frédéric Louis Viesse de". In Hodge, Carl C. (ed.). Encyclopedia of the Age of Imperialism, 1800-1914: [2 volumes]. Bloomsbury Publishing USA. p. 459. ISBN 978-0-313-04341-3.
- Hamilton-Williams, David The Fall of Napoleon. John Wiley and Sons, New York, 1994. ISBN 0-471-11862-1
