= Robe (disambiguation) =

A robe is a loose-fitting outer garment.

Robe may also refer to:

== Places ==
=== Australia ===
- Robe, South Australia, a town and locality on the southeast coast of South Australia
  - District Council of Robe, a local government area with its offices in the town
  - Robe wine region, a wine region adjoining the town of Robe in South Australia
- County of Robe, a cadastral unit in of South Australia

=== Ethiopia ===
- Bale Robe, also spelled Roobee, a town in the Bale Zone of Oromia, Ethiopia
- Apostolic Prefecture of Robe, a Latin Catholic pre-diocesan jurisdiction with see in the above? below city
- Robe, Arsi, the capital of the Robe Aanaa in the Arsi Zone of Oromia, Ethiopia
  - Robe (Aanaa), a Aanaa (district) in the Arsi Zone of Oromia, Ethiopia

=== Elsewhere ===
- Robe, Washington, a community in the United States

== Rivers ==
- Robe River (Australia), a river flowing in Western Australia
- Robe River (Ethiopia), which flows through the Robe woreda in the Arsi Zone of Oromia Region, Ethiopia
- Robe River (Ireland), in Mayo, Ireland

== People ==
- Roberto Iniesta (born 1962), Spanish musician known as "Robe"
- Annie Robe (1866–1922), British-American actress
- Ben Calf Robe (born 1958), Blackfoot elder, residential school survivor and scout
- Christopher Robe, American academic and media critic
- Corneliu Robe (1908–1969), Romanian footballer
- Emmanuel Robe (born 2002), French footballer
- Frederick Robe (1801–1871), British politician and Governor of South Australia
- Harold A. Robe (1881–1946), American lyricist
- Leighanne Robe (born 1993), English footballer
- Moving Robe Woman (1854–1935), Lakota woman who fought in the Battle of the Little Bighorn
- William Robe (1765–1820), British military officer
- William Livingstone Robe (1791–1815), British military officer
- Wolf Robe (c. 1840–1910), Cheyenne chief

== Other uses ==
- Informal name for:
  - a wardrobe
  - a dressing gown
  - a bathrobe

== See also ==
- The Robe (disambiguation)
- Robe River (disambiguation)
- Yellow Robe, a surname
