= Siege of Astorga (1812) =

1812 siege during the Peninsular War

- Part of the Peninsular War
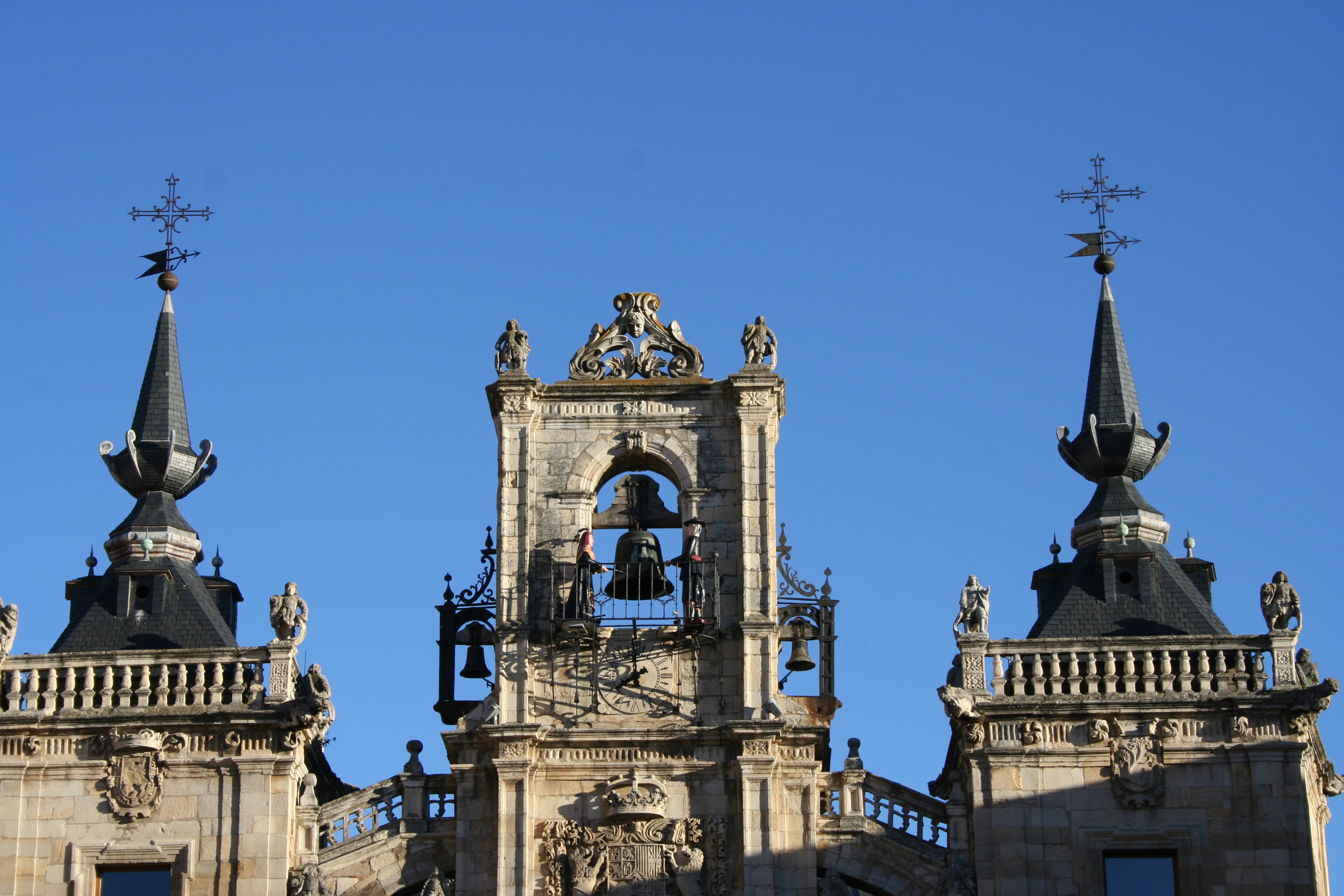
- View of the Town Hall of Astorga
Date	29 June – 19 August 1812
Location	Astorga, Spain 42°27′32″N 6°3′48″W
Result	Spanish victory

Belligerents
(First French Empire) French Empire	Spain

Commanders and leaders
(First French Empire) Maximilien Foy	Francisco Castaños; José Santocildes

Strength
2,000; 14–17 guns	28,000

Casualties and losses
1,200 killed, wounded or captured 14–17 guns lost	Unknown

Peninsular War
Castile 1811–13
current battle

The siege of Astorga of 1812 took place between 29 June and 19 August 1812, at Astorga, León, Castile-León, Spain, during the Peninsular War.

== Background ==
The French autumn counterattack started with the Siege of Astorga.

== Siege ==
On 29 June, the Spanish troops of Lieutenant-General Francisco Gómez de Terán y Negrete, Marquess of Portago, started the operations, and laid siege to Astorga. The siege was part of the Allied offensive in the summer of 1812. The Spanish VI Army led by General José María Santocildes, by order of General Francisco Castaños, take the measures necessary for the recovery of Astorga. On 18 August, after a hard resistance, the French garrison surrendered to the Spaniards. During the siege, part of the Spanish troops marched towards Salamanca to join the Allied army under Arthur Wellesley, commanded by General Santocildes, and contributed successfully in the campaign with the capture of Tordesillas, blocking Toro and Zamora, and occupying Valladolid.

== Aftermath ==
The French autumn counterattack proceeded with the Siege of Burgos.

== See also ==
- Siege of Astorga 1810
- Battle of Salamanca
