= Battle of Tordesillas (1812) =

1812 siege during the Peninsular War

- Part of the Peninsular War
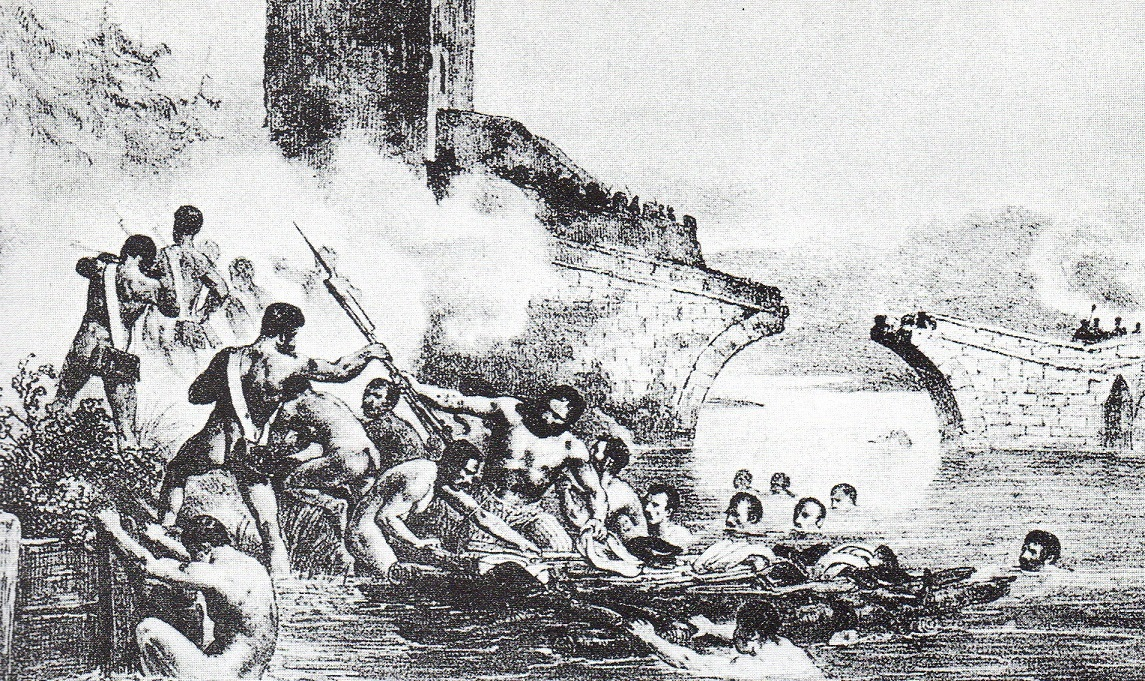
- The feat of Captain Guingret from Foy's command at Tordesillas (depiction by Charles Motte).
Date	25–29 October 1812
Location	Tordesillas and its surroundings, Spain 41°30′N 5°0′W
Result	French victory

Belligerents
(First French Empire) French Empire	(United Kingdom of Great Britain and Ireland) United Kingdom; Portugal; Spain

Commanders and leaders
(First French Empire) Joseph Souham (First French Empire) Maximilien Foy	(United Kingdom of Great Britain and Ireland) Arthur Wellesley; José Santocildes

Strength
53,000	35,000

Casualties and losses
approx. 350 killed, wounded or captured	approx. 800 killed, wounded or captured

Peninsular War: Spain
current battle
Wellington in command
Wellington not in command

In the Battle of Tordesillas, Battle of Villamuriel or Battle of Palencia between 25 and 29 October 1812, a French army led by Joseph Souham outmaneuvered and pushed back an Anglo-Portuguese-Spanish army commanded by Arthur Wellesley, Marquess Wellington. After its failed Siege of Burgos, the 35,000-man Allied army withdrew to the west, pursued by Souham's 53,000 French soldiers. On 23 October, French cavalry defeated the Allied rear guard in the Battle of Venta del Pozo. The Allies pulled back behind the Pisuerga and Carrión Rivers and took up a defensive position.

Beginning on the 25th there were clashes at Palencia and Villamuriel de Cerrato as Souham sought to turn the Allied north flank. The offence on Villamuriel was unsuccessful for the French, but by a well-executed attack on Palencia – Wellington's left wing – Souham forced Wellington to adopt a new unorthodox defensive position. The French commander was prompted to pause for reconnaissance. The stalemate was broken on 29 October when the laborious General of Division Maximilien Sébastien Foy managed to get a party of naked French soldiers swam the Duero River at Tordesillas with their weapons on a raft. Upon reaching the far bank, they took up their guns and routed the Brunswick defenders of a key bridge. When across, Foy was rapidly strengthened by the rest of Souham's army. With an intact bridge in French hands, Wellington was forced to continue his retreat toward Portugal. In the battle, the Coalition lost 800 men killed, wounded, and captured (excluding the last affair, in which the losses on both sides are unknown), while the French casualties were 350.

Meanwhile, Wellington's subordinate Rowland Hill withdrew from Madrid. The two British commanders united their armies near Alba de Tormes on 8 November. By this time the combined French armies were led by Jean-de-Dieu Soult. Though 80,000 French faced 65,000 Allies on the battlefield of Salamanca neither commander initiated a battle, whereupon Wellington began a withdrawal. After a retreat in miserable conditions during which hundreds of soldiers were captured or died of hunger and exposure, the Allied army went into winter quarters. The actions were fought during the Peninsular War, part of the Napoleonic Wars.

== Background ==
On 22 July 1812, General Arthur Wellesley, Marquess Wellington's won a great victory over Marshal Auguste Marmont's Army of Portugal at the Battle of Salamanca. Marmont was badly wounded, two of his division commanders were killed, and his army severely mauled with 10,000 killed and wounded. An additional 4,000 soldiers, 20 cannons, two eagles, and six colors were captured for Allied losses of 4,762 men. King Joseph Bonaparte evacuated Madrid and its forts surrendered to the Allies on 13 August. One major consequence of Salamanca was that Marshal Jean-de-Dieu Soult raised the two and one-half year Siege of Cádiz on 25 August 1812 and abandoned the province of Andalusia.

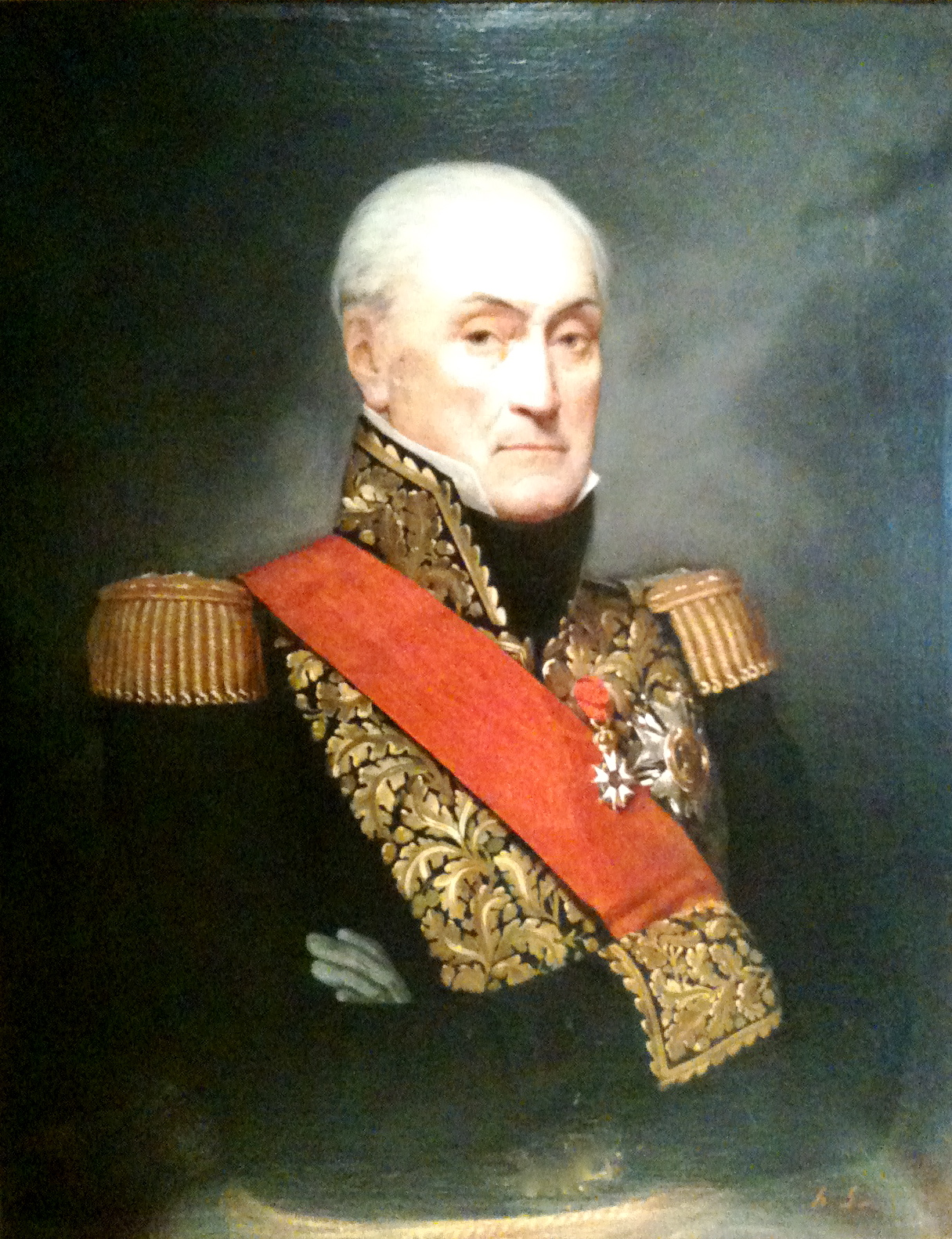
General Joseph Souham

Hoping to exploit the summer's successes, Wellington began the Siege of Burgos on 19 September 1812. Burgos' 2,000-man garrison was led by General of Brigade Jean-Louis Dubreton who supervised a very able and aggressive defense. During their futile siege, the Allies suffered 2,100 casualties before withdrawing on 21 October. While Wellington was attempting to reduce Burgos, the French reacted promptly to the crisis. To oppose his 35,000-man army, General of Division Joseph Souham assembled 53,000 men in the north of Spain. This force included 41,000 men of the reconstituted Army of Portugal, 6,500 infantry and 2,300 cavalry from the Army of the North, and a 3,400-man brigade from Bayonne. In the south, Soult and Joseph advanced on Madrid with 61,000 soldiers and 84 guns. To oppose these masses, Lieutenant General Rowland Hill had 31,000 Anglo-Portuguese and 12,000 Spaniards. Wellington's host included 24,000 Anglo-Portuguese and 12,000 Spanish troops under General José María Santocildes.

Wellington stole a march on Souham and the Frenchman did not discover the Allied retreat until late on 22 October. Souham immediately launched almost 6,000 cavalry in pursuit of his enemies. On the 23rd, the Allied main body crossed the Pisuerga River at Torquemada and spread out to defend the west bank. The same day, the French cavalry fought Wellington's rear guard in the drawn Battle of Venta del Pozo. The Allies counted 230 casualties while the French lost about 200 men.

== Battle ==
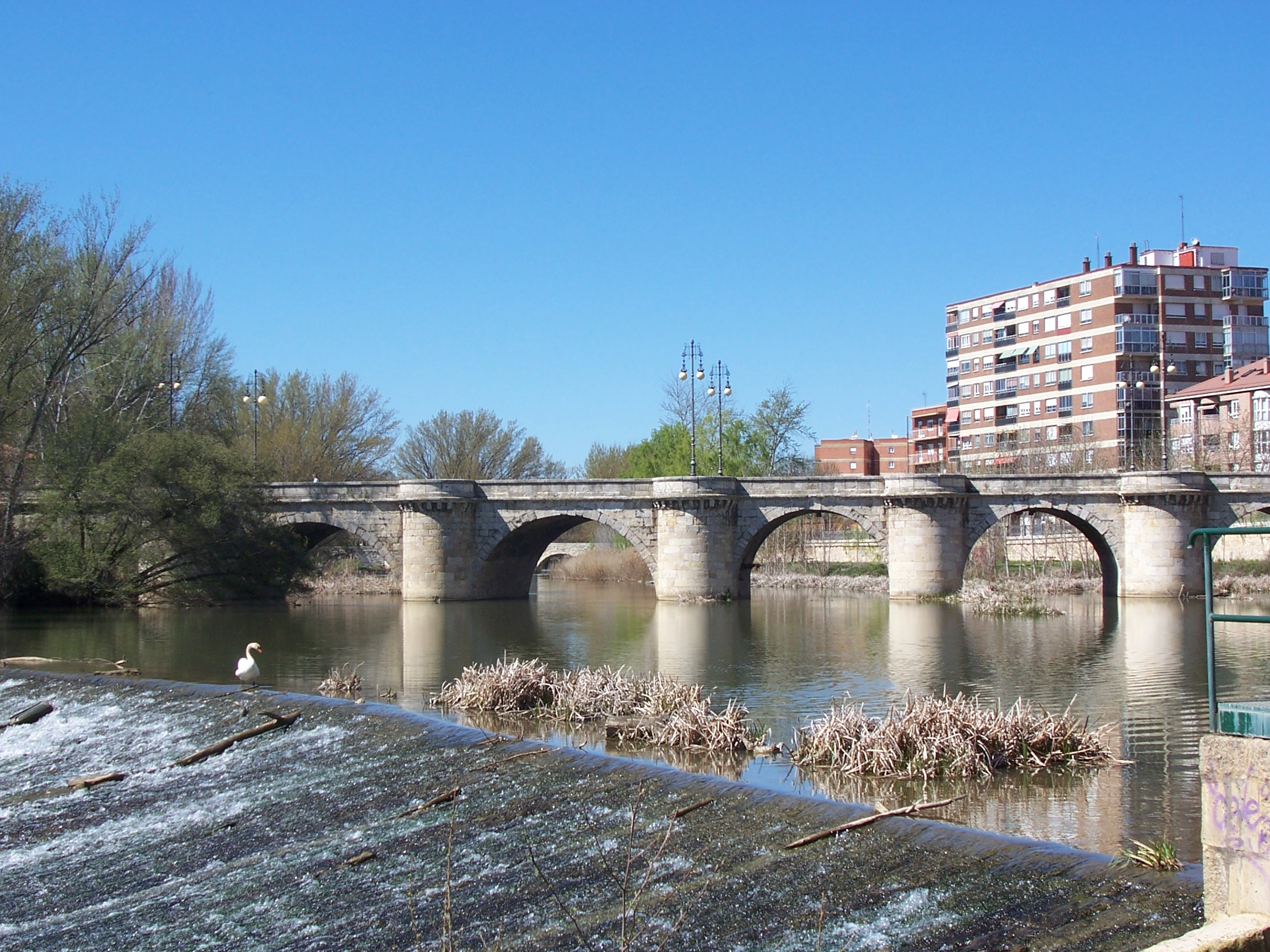
Stone bridge at Palencia

On 25 October, Souham advanced on Wellington's center and left flank which were posted along the Pisuerga and Carrión Rivers with his right flank at Valladolid. A French probe of his center was repulsed by the 5th Division, but on the left a Spanish division was driven from Palencia on the east bank of the Carrión. The Spanish were pursued so closely that the French got across the Carrión bridge before it could be blown up and General Maximilien Sébastien Foy's division secured a bridgehead. General Antoine Louis Popon de Maucune's division crossed the Carrión farther south at Villamuriel de Cerrato. Since, Foy's and Maucune's thrusts threatened to cut off a portion of his army, Wellington committed four brigades to drive Maucune back. After a tough fight the French were ejected from Villamuriel. In these operations, the French inflicted 800 casualties on the Allies while losing only 350 men. With his river defenses outflanked by Foy, Wellington ingeniously shifted his army to the east bank of the Pisuerga. While on the 23rd he held the west bank of the Pisuerga, on the 25th he defended the east bank. Planting his left flank (formerly his right) at Valladolid and securing his right flank on a tributary river 20 miles (32 km) upstream, the British army commander held a strong position. The baffled Souham ordered a reconnaissance as he pondered the situation for a couple of days, then Foy scored another coup.

On 29 October, Captain Guingret led 54 men of the 6th Light Infantry Regiment across the Duero River at Tordesillas. The soldiers stripped naked and silently swam across the river, towing a raft with their weapons. Taking up their muskets, they attacked the bridge guard which consisted of a half-company of the Brunswick Oels Jägers. Surprised and attacked from an unexpected direction, the Brunswick officer and his men fled, allowing the French to capture the bridge along with nine prisoners, while suffering no losses. The seizure of a bridge to the west compromised Wellington's defensive line. Foy's troops at Tordesillas were reinforced by Souham. Though Wellington managed to contain the French bridgehead, he was forced to order a retreat.

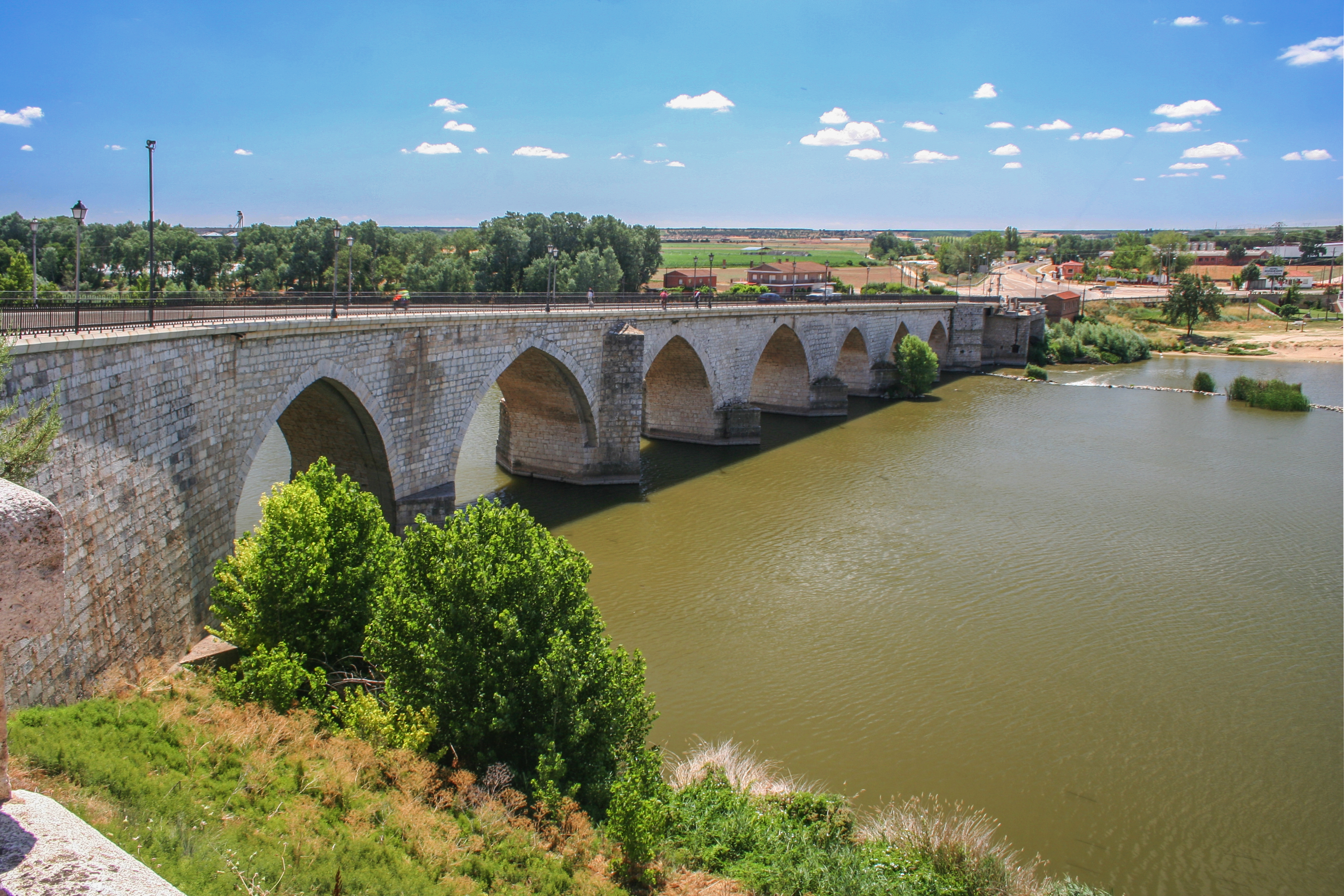
Stone bridge over the Duero at Tordesillas.

== Retreat ==
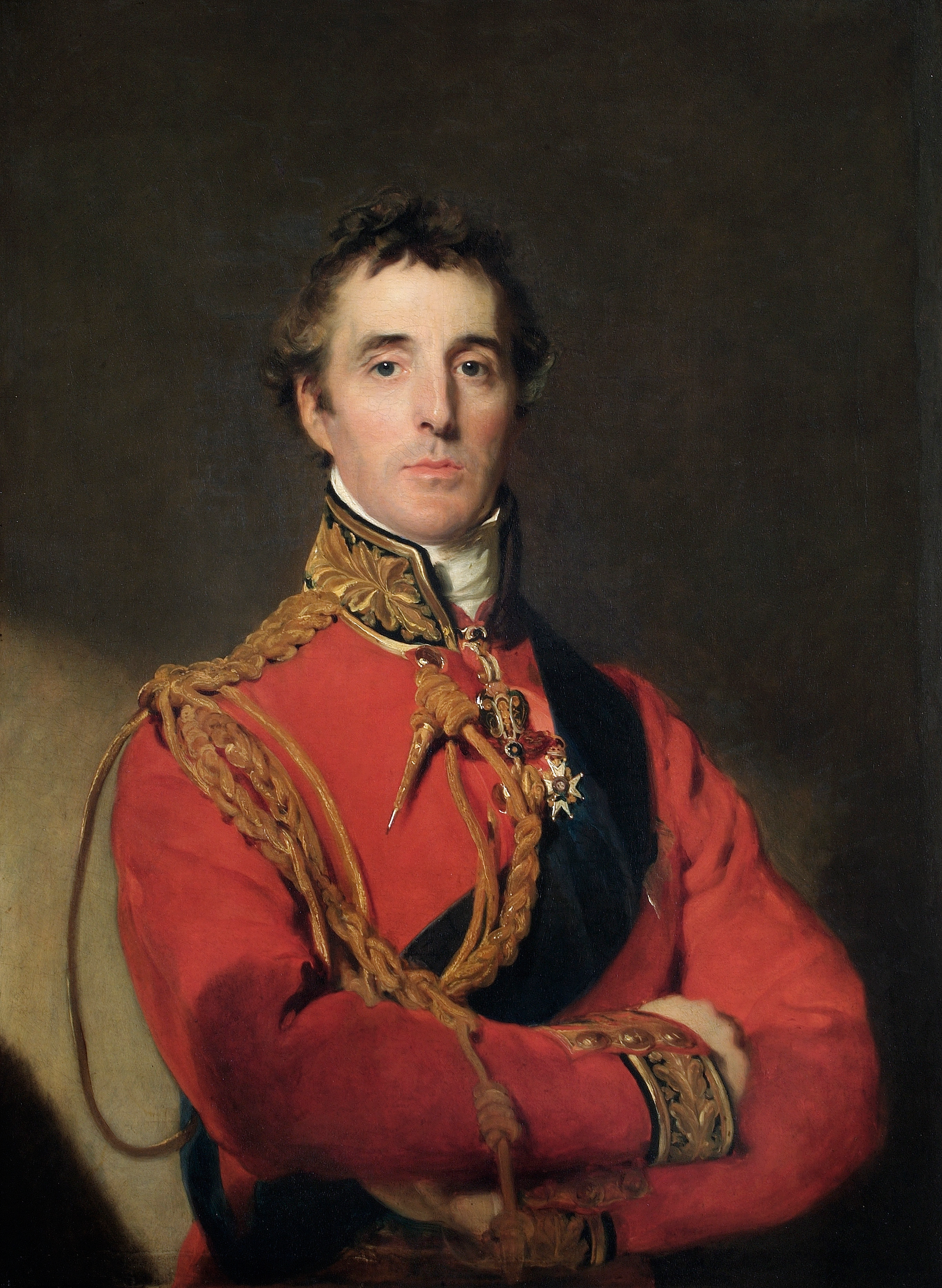
Arthur Wellesley, Marquess of Wellington

Soon afterward, Souham's pursuit slackened when General of Division Marie-François Auguste de Caffarelli du Falga reclaimed 12,000 Army of the North troops and returned to the Bay of Biscay coast to deal with a new outbreak of Spanish guerilla attacks. Following instructions from Wellington, Hill evacuated Madrid on 31 October 1812. Hill's 4,000-man rear guard held off Soult's advance guard at the Aranjuez bridge on the 30th. A week later, he linked up with Wellington near Alba de Tormes. Meanwhile, Souham joined Soult on 8 November. On 10 and 11 November the two armies sparred along the Tormes River near Alba. Twelve voltiguer (light infantry) companies and the 45th Line Infantry Regiment of the French 5th Division were repelled by Brigadier General Kenneth Howard's brigade of the 2nd Division. This unit included the 1st Battalions of the 50th Foot, 71st Foot, and 92nd Foot and was supported by 2nd and 14th Portuguese Line Infantry Regiments. Casualties amounted to 158 French, 69 British, and 44 Portuguese. Disappointed here, Soult's army crossed the Tormes farther south and Wellington fell back.

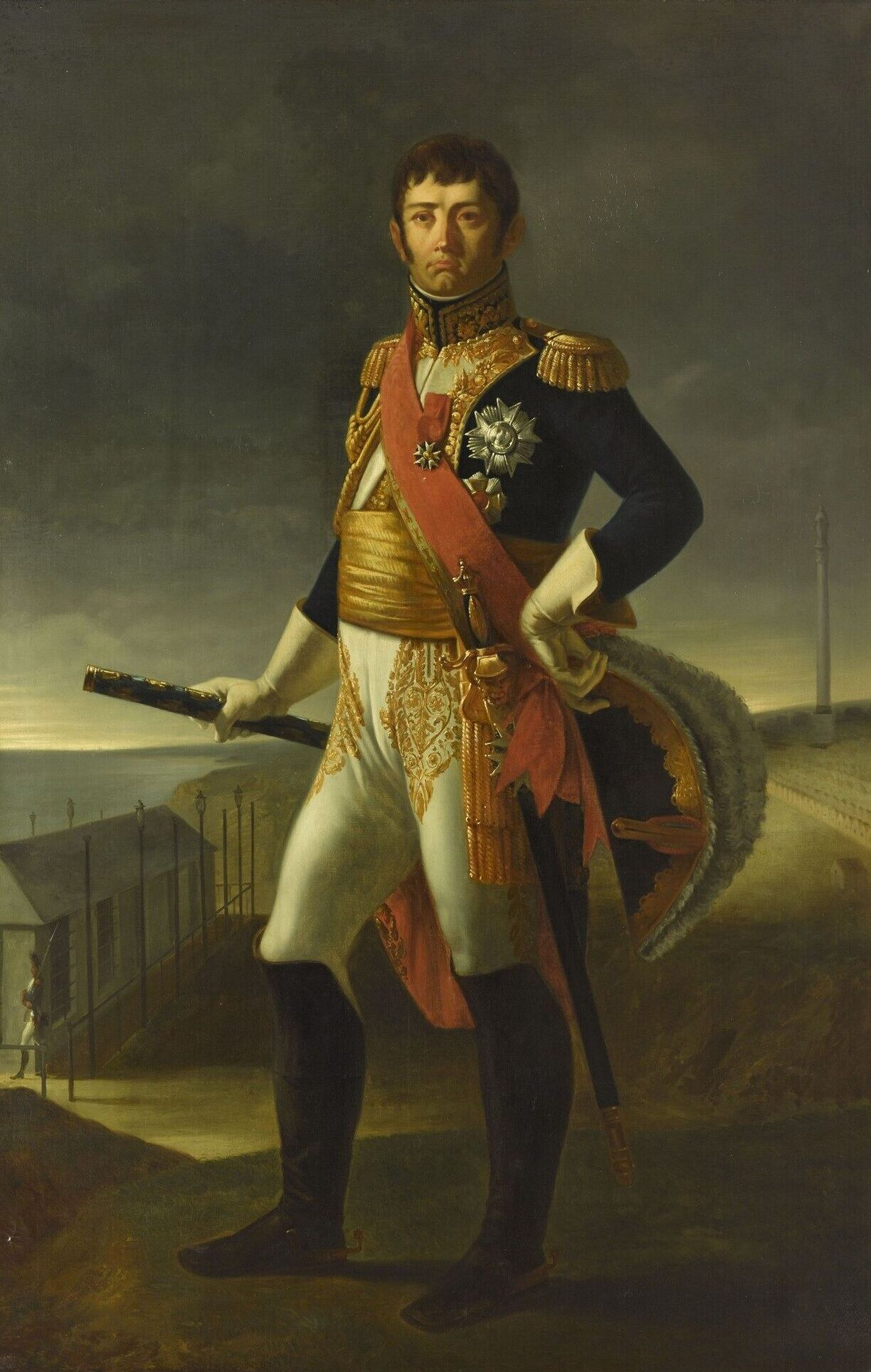
Marshal Jean-de-Dieu Soult

On 15 November, 80,000 French troops faced 65,000 Allied soldiers on the old Salamanca battlefield. To the fury of the French soldiers and officers, Soult failed to order an attack. Instead, Wellington began retreating that afternoon. As the Allies marched away, rain began to fall continuously. As the supplies in the Salamanca depots were feverishly packed up and sent away, Wellington's logistical arrangements collapsed completely. Fortunately for the Allies, Joseph had forbidden all but his cavalry to pursue. On 16 November at Matilla de los Caños del Río, Brigadier General Charles Alten with 1,300 men clashed with 2,000 French cavalry consisting of the 2nd Hussar, 5th and 27th Chasseurs à Cheval and 7th Lancer Regiments. Alten had the 1st and 2nd Hussars of the King's German Legion and the 14th Light Dragoons, as well as two cannons and the light company of the 1st Battalion of the 28th Foot. The French lost 50 men, almost all of whom were wounded and captured, while Alten's command suffered 34 casualties.

Already demoralized by having to retreat, the Allied soldiers were soon forced to survive on acorns when the inept Quartermaster General James Willoughby Gordon directed the supply trains onto the wrong road. On 17 November, Gordon sent the cavalry rear guard off to a flank and for a time the retreating infantry were directly exposed to the attentions of the French cavalry. On this day, Wellington's second-in-command Edward Paget was made a prisoner by the French horsemen. The misery of the hungry foot soldiers was intense as they struggled to march on muddy roads in the cold weather.

During the retreat three of Wellington's division commanders took matters into their own hands. Lieutenant General William Stewart and two others decided to disobey the army commander's direct order to retreat by a certain road. Stewart was joined by Lieutenant General George Ramsay, Lord Dalhousie and either Major General John Oswald or Lieutenant General Henry Clinton. When Wellington found them in the morning, the three divisions were in complete confusion. Later the army commander was asked what he said in the situation and he replied, "Oh, by God, it was too serious to say anything." On 16 November, the French cavalry rounded up 600 stragglers and the following day, they captured even more.

The Allies staggered into their base at Ciudad Rodrigo on 19 November. Two-fifths of the army's soldiers were either ill or missing. The humor of the rank and file was not improved when Wellington issued a nasty letter to his division and brigade commanders and it was leaked to the press. A total of 5,000 men were missing. While many of the missing were on the way to French prison camps, the majority had died from starvation or hypothermia. Though the Allied army had apparently been defeated, in fact much had been accomplished in 1812. The French had been ejected from the cities of Ciudad Rodrigo, Badajoz, Seville, and Astorga, and the provinces of Andalusia, Extremadura, and Asturias.
