= Battle of Cogorderos =

1811 battle during the Peninsular War

- Part of the Peninsular War
Date	23 June 1811
Location	Near Benavides, Spain 42°32′N 5°56′W
Result	Spanish victory

Belligerents
(First French Empire) French Empire	Spain

Commanders and leaders
(First French Empire) Jean-André Valletaux †; (First French Empire) Jean Pierre François Bonet	Francisco Taboada

Strength
3,000	6,000–7,300

Casualties and losses
500 killed, wounded or captured Hundreds of prisoners	17 killed 83 wounded

Peninsular War
Castile 1811–13
current battle

The Battle of Cogorderos took place at Cogorderos, in the Province of León, Castile-León, on 23 June 1811, between a French force under Brigadier General Jean-André Valletaux and a Spanish force commanded by General Francisco Taboada y Gil during the Peninsular War. After seven hours of battle, the French were defeated and retreated to León. Despite the victory, Taboada, threatened by the bulk of General Jean Pierre François Bonet's army, retired to Astorga. However, Bonet and Marshal Jean-Baptiste Bessières decided against sending more troops to Extremadura, which favored the advance of Wellington in the south.

== Background ==
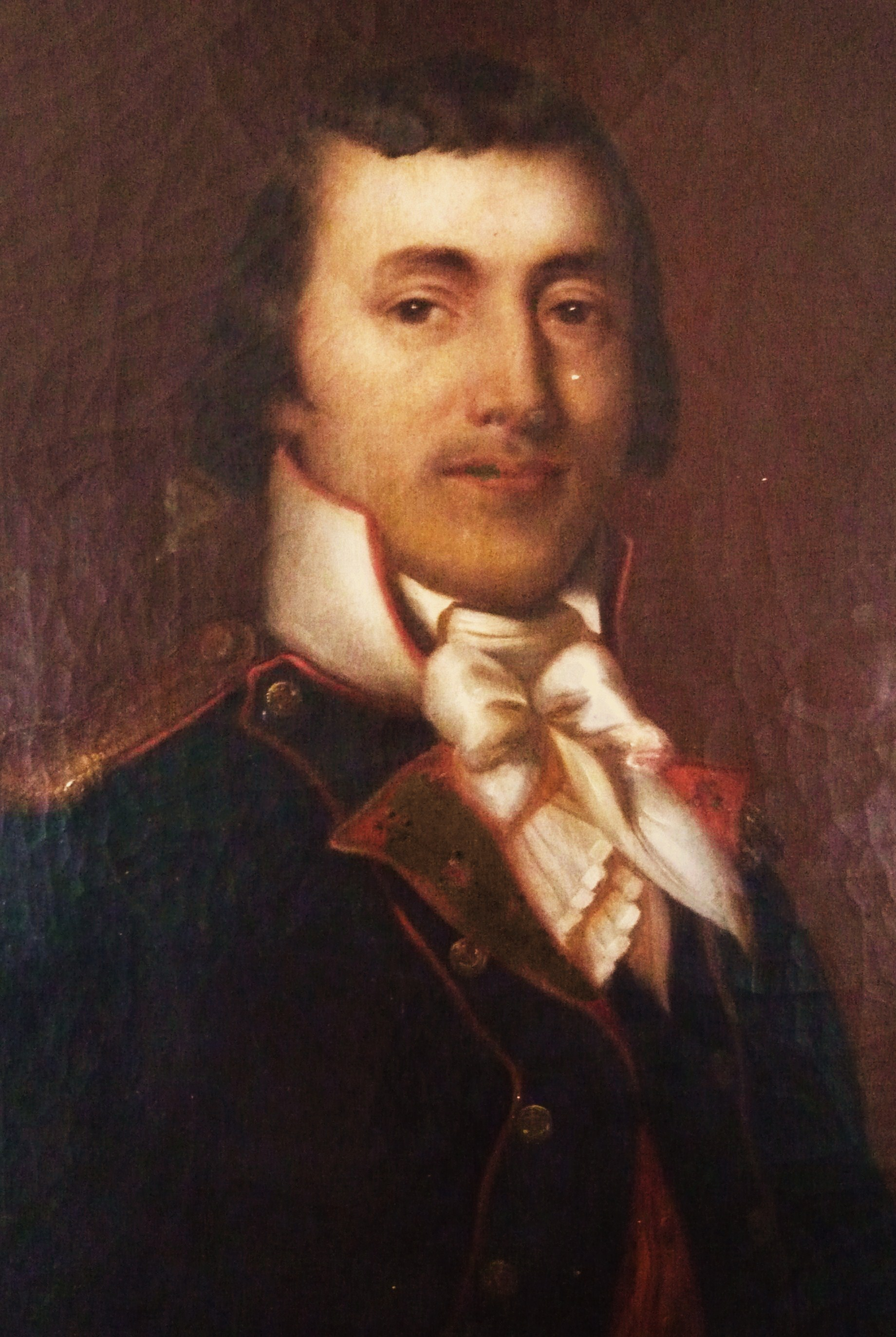
Brig-General Jean-André Valletaux

In June 1811, the French occupied the Páramo Leonés. In response, Spanish troops under the command of Field Marshal José María Santocildes launched a strong attack against the French garrison at León, and forced the French to evacuate the city. The garrison commander of León, Brigadier General Jean-Baptiste Jeanin, destroyed several sections of the wall of the city, and on 19 June, retreated to Benavente. On 22 June, Santocildes and his forces entered in León, after 14 months of French occupation; the imminent arrival of French reinforcements, however, forced them to withdraw a short time later.

Meanwhile, General Jean Pierre François Bonet moved from Asturias to León, concentrating his troops on the right bank of the river Órbigo. On the morning of 23 June, Brigadier General Jean-André Valletaux with 5,000 men, relieved the French garrison in the town of Benavides. At heavy cost to themselves, the French forced the Spanish to retreat, who withdrew having suffered few casualties. The French general then decided to attack General Francisco Taboada y Gil's troops, located in the small town of Cogorderos.

== Battle ==
Despite having little knowledge of Taboada's troops, and possessing a smaller force than his opponent, Valletaux went on the attack. The Spanish fought tenaciously for more than four hours, until Brigadier General Federico Castañón arrived with three battalions of the Oviedo Regiment, commanded by Colonel Pedro Méndez de Vigo. In concert with Taboada's cavalry, the newcomers attacked the French flank and turned the tide of the battle. The Spanish launched three charges, inflicting heavy losses on the French, and after seven hours of battle, the French finally retreated, leaving behind a large amount of weapons and equipment, and several hundred of prisoners, including 11 officers. Valletaux himself was killed in the fighting, dying in the first Spanish charge. The Spanish captured three regimental eagles, and hunted down many of the French soldiers as they withdrew. Total French casualties amounted to 500 dead or wounded, while the Spanish lost 17 dead and 83 wounded.

== Aftermath ==
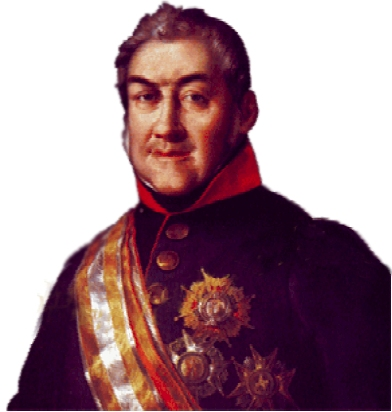
Field Marshal José María Santocildes

Despite the victory, Taboada, threatened by the bulk of the army of General Jean Pierre François Bonet, retired to Astorga. However, Bonet and Marshal Bessières suspended sending more troops to Extremadura, which favored Wellington's advance in the south. In July, the French army at León was reinforced with several thousand men under General Jean-Marie Dorsenne, who replaced Bessières.
