= Francisco Javier Abadía =

Spanish army officer (1770–1836)

- Born: 1770; Barcelona, Catalonia, Spain
- Died: 16 February 1836 (aged 65–66) Málaga, Andalusia
- Conflicts: War of the Pyrenees; Siege of Toulon; Siege of Roses; War of the Oranges; Peninsular War; Battle of Bailén; Battle of Uclés; Battle of Ciudad Real; Battle of Barrosa

Francisco Javier Abadía y Aragorri (1770–1836) was a Spanish lieutenant general and, briefly, minister of war.

== Early career ==
Abadía enlisted as a cadet in the Toledo Infantry Regiment and was garrisoned at Ceuta and Melilla.

In 1793, during the War of the Pyrenees, he saw action as a sub-lieutenant at Toulon and promoted to second lieutenant for his bravery in action. He saw further action at Balaguer, at the strategic bridge at Molins de Rei and at Sant Llorenç de la Muga.

Following the fall of Figueras (28 November 1794), Abadía took part in defending Rosas (28 November 1794 – 4 February 1795), until the governor, General Domingo Izquierdo, ordered the stronghold to be evacuated by sea, and Abadía, at the head of 500 troops, was ordered to oversee the operation. Taken prisoner by the French, he remained in captivity until the end of the war, in July 1795. In 1799 he was promoted to lieutenant.

He saw action during the War of the Oranges, and in December 1802 Abadía was promoted to captain of the newly created Monte Mayor Light Infantry Battalion, where he served together with Captain José de San Martín.

In 1803 Abadía was promoted to lieutenant colonel and transferred to Cadiz where, four years later, he was promoted to colonel.

== Peninsular War (1807–1814) ==
=== 1808 ===
At the outbreak of the war, Abadía fought with the Army of Andalusia's 1st Division, under Reding. At Mengíbar (16 July 1808) he fought hand-to-hand with a French cuirassier officer, whom he took prisoner, and three days later he fought at Bailén. He was promoted to brigadier for these two actions.

In December 1808, while serving under the Marquis del Palacio in the Army of the Centre, Abadía was promoted to field marshal, promotion he turned down.

=== 1809 ===
In January 1809 he fought at Uclés, where the Army of the Centre suffered a major defeat and retreated into the Sierra Morena, where he was incorporated into the Army of La Mancha, under José de Urbina, Count of Cartaojal.

Cartaojal, having established his headquarters at Ciudad Real, was harassed by General Sebastiani's forces at Consuegra (Toledo) and, on withdrawing from there towards the end of March, was heavily defeated at Ciudad Real, Santa Cruz de Mudela y El Viso del Marqués. As a result of these defeats, Cartaojal was forced to relinquish his command of the Army of the Centre to General Venegas, and in April was arrested pending a court martial, together with Field marshal Tomás Moreno and Brigadier Abadía.

Abadía's situation was further complicated when the Junta Superior de Granada accused him not only of fomenting unrest among the troops by his reforms, without ever achieving order and discipline, but also cast doubt over his loyalty due to his friendship with General Tomás de Morla who, having been sent to Madrid to negotiate the capitulation of the capital, had surrendered himself to the French as a prisoner of war and was thereafter branded a traitor by the Cortes.

Following this accusation, the Junta Suprema sentenced Abadía to solitary confinement pending trial and sent him to Úbeda. After a month and a half, given that the accusations against him had not been proven, together with his evident illness, he was allowed to travel to Málaga, pending any possible implication in the court martial against Cartaojal. Meanwhile, that June he was promoted to field marshal for his services during the withdrawal of the Army of Andalusia to Sierra Morena, promotion that was back-dated to 1808, when he had originally turned doen the promotion.

When Andalusia was invaded in January 1810, Abadía hastened to Campo de Gibraltar, and the following May was appointed commander-in-chief of the region where, on several occasions, he was able to prevent the French troops from landing along the coast of Málaga or crossing the Serranía de Ronda.

In March 1810 the court martial against Cartaojal, to which Abadía was finally only called as a witness, was dropped and Abadía was fully absolved of any irregularity.

=== 1811 ===
In January 1811, now with the 4th Army, Abadía saw further action at Sancti Petri and at Barrosa.

In May 1811 Castaños sent Abadía to replace Santocildes as commander-in-chief of the Army of Galicia, now the 6th Army. (Note: According to Oman (1911): "He [Abadía] was in every way inferior to his junior and predecessor [Santocildes], being neither so alert nor so cautious, and having a craze for unnecessary innovation in matters of detail, which might have been harmless in time of peace, but was vexatious when carried out during a campaign. Wellington had at first conceived great expectations from his intelligence, but soon became entirely disappointed with him". (Oman 1911, p. 469.))

That August, 30,000 French troops under Jean-Marie Dorsenne, set on expelling the Spanish forces from region of Astorga, attacked Abadía's outposts. Fortunately for his army, Abadía, heeding the advice of his predecessor, Santocildes, had already taken to the hills and his divisions only suffered serious defeats at the mountain passes of Manzanal (under General Federico Castañón) and Fuencebadon (under Conde de Belvedere). Dorsenne then sacked Villafranca del Bierzo (28 August) and withdrew to Astorga on the 30th-31st, burning every village on his way. Although Abadía was able to reoccupy Villafranca and Ponferrada, the British commissioner with Abadía's army, lieutenant colonel Sir Howard Douglas, reported that his troops were "in even worse condition than might be expected...". (Note: "—half the soldiers without trousers, and wearing only capotes—while the clothing of the rest shows great need for improvement. They are a fine body of men, standing well, though deeply marked by privation, and as badly trained as equipped. The best corps can only manœuvre singly, not attempting movements of the line; the Toledo battalion broke down in attempting to change front en échelon. The cavalry are on a level with the infantry, move with wide gaps between squadrons, and cannot go accurately through the sword exercise. The horses might each be a Rosinante—the artillery as badly manned as horsed." (Oman 1911, p. 473))

And although Abadía had started the June campaign with some 15,000 men present under arms, (Note: 1st Division: Major-General Losada (Asturians): 5,459; 2nd Division: Major-General Taboada: 3,994; 3rd Division: Major-General Cabrera: 2,567; Reserve at Lugo: 2,654; Cavalry: 631. (Oman 1911, p. 637)) his army had now been reduced to, at most, 10,000 men.

=== 1812 ===
In June 1812, while still commander-in-chief of the army of Galicia, Abadía was appointed minister of War, although he later resigned both posts for health reasons. Once recovered, in November, he was transferred to the Army of the Reserve being created at El Puerto de Santa María, and the following month accepted the command of its 1st Division.

=== 1813 ===
In February 1813 he was commissioned to organise the corps to be sent overseas and later that year he was appointed chief inspector of these corps stationed at Isla de León. He was then tasked with setting up a military academy and an arsenal in Granada. However, his health again led him to resign his post and request permission to concentrate on recovering fully.

=== 1814 ===
Unable to return to service until October 1814, he was then given command of the newly created General Inspection of Veteran Troops and Infantry and Cavalry Militias of America, based in Madrid

== Post-war career ==
In 1815 he was promoted to lieutenant general and awarded the Grand Cross of the Order of Isabella the Catholic. Towards the end of the year, he was transferred to Cádiz.

In August 1816 he was arrested by General Álvarez Campana, and imprisoned in the Cartuja de Jerez, before being transferred to the Alhambra at Granada and from there to Valencia, where he was imprisoned for some six months in the Monastery of San Miguel de los Reyes. He then spent two years confined to barracks at Peñíscola, and later moved to Benicarló and Alicante, without ever being interrogated or being informed of any charges against him.

Whilst confined to barracks at Alicante in 1819 he was awarded the Grand Cross of the Order of Saint Ferdinand and of Merit, the highest honour for distinguished service awarded to officers.

With the advent of a new political regime, in 1820 he was allowed to travel to Málaga, where he spent much time visiting spas to recover his health as well as trying to recover all the documentation that had been confiscated from him when he was arrested.

That December, he was appointed interim military governor of Málaga.

In April 1821 he resigned his post and was appointed political head of the province of Murcia. While at Murcia, he was denounced by a deputy for his opposition to the Government, for which the Supreme Court of Spain, following a request from Parliament, initiated proceedings against him.

In August 1823 he was taken prisoner by the Milicia Nacional who had an order signed by General Riego to deport Abadía to Tangier. However, during the voyage another boat rescued Abadía and brought him back to Spain. That October Abadía was appointed commander-in-chief of Campo de Gibraltar, and the following December, captain general of Granada.

In January 1824 Fernando VII gave Abadía permission to return to Málaga.

In January 1832 he was called to Madrid and commissioned with studying the situation of the convicts of the Kingdom.

In August 1833 he presented his resignation as captain general of Granada for health reasons. However, on detecting an outbreak of cholera in Huelva that same month, he stayed on to prevent the epidemic spreading further. The following November he was able to resign and was appointed member of the Supreme Council of War and the Navy.

In April 1834 he was appointed member of the War commission of the Royal Council of Spain and the Indies, although he resigned the following October and took up residence at the barracks at Granada.
