= José María Santocildes =

Spanish general

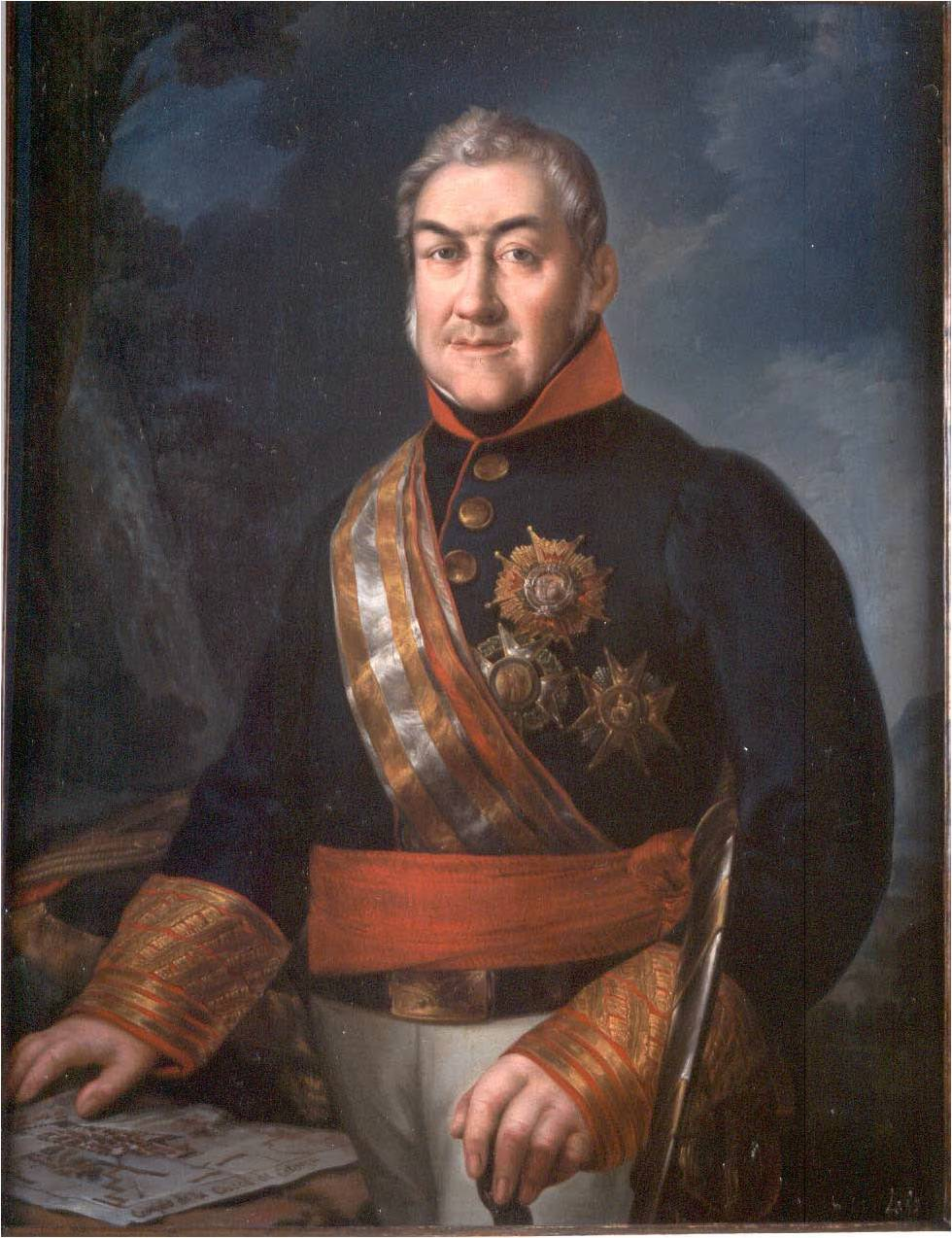
- Portrait by Miguel Parra Abril
- Born: 29 June 1771; Barcelona, Spain
- Died: 6 March 1847 (aged 75)
- Conflicts: Peninsular War; Battle of Medina de Rioseco; Battle of Zornoza; Battle of Espinosa de los Monteros; Siege of Astorga; Battle of Cogorderos; Battle of Tordesillas; Siege of Astorga; Siege of Burgos

José María Santocildes y Llanos (1771–1847) was a Spanish general during the Peninsular War.

== Peninsular War ==
He commanded the Spanish garrison at Astorga which, on 9 October 1809, repelled an attack by Carrier and for which Santocildes was promoted to brigadier. In January the following year, he carried out an attack at Puente de Órbigo (25 January 1810), but was forced to retreat to Astorga, where he was besieged by General Loison's division from 11 to 16 February 1810 and, some ten days later, by Marshal Clauzel who, on 26 February, invited Santocildes to capitulate before declaring a full siege on 21 March.

The siege-train arrived on 15 April, and two days later, Clauzel's superior, General Junot, arrived to witness the final attack. After an "admirable" defence, Santocildes was forced to surrender on the 22nd, when his infantry only had thirty cartridges a head left.

Taken prisoner, Santocildes was interned at Mâcon. Managing to escape in October, he reported for duty at Cadiz in February 1811.

He was sent to the Army of Galicia, where he again took command of the Regmiment of Santiago. In March 1811, he was appointed interim commander-in-chief of the 6th Army, overseeing the training and reorganising it into three infantry divisions and a Reserve division.

By Summer 1811, he had 15,305 men present under arms, with Major-Generals Losada heading the 1st Division (Asturians); Taboada, the 2nd Division; Cabrera, the 3rd Division. Some 5,500 men were left to garrison Ferrol, Vigo, and Corunna.

That August, Santocildes handed over his command to Abadía, was promoted to field marshal.

== Post-war career ==
During the Hundred Days, he was chief of staff of Castaños's Ejército de Observación de la Derecha, from April 1815 to January 1816.

He was promoted to lieutenant general in 1816.

He was captain general of Valencia from November 1832 to August 1833 and in November 1834 he was appointed interim captain general of Catalonia.

== Bibliography ==
- . (in Catalan)
- "El Coronel Santocildes: Un Heroe Humilde". (in Spanish)
- Glover, Michael (2001). The Peninsular War 1807-1814. London: Penguin. ISBN 0-141-39041-7
- Smith, Digby (1998). The Napoleonic Wars Data Book. London: Greenhill. ISBN 1-85367-276-9
