= Robe River =

Robe River may refer to:

- River Robe (Ireland)
- Robe River (Australia)
- Robe River (Ethiopia)

== See also ==
- Robe (disambiguation)
