= The Robe (disambiguation) =

The Robe is a 1942 novel about the crucifixion of Jesus.

The Robe may also refer to:

- The Robe (film), a 1953 Biblical epic film adaptation of the novel
- The Robe (album), a 1997 album by the hard rock band Ten
  - The Robe (EP), a 1997 EP by Ten, the title song on Ten's eponymous album
- "The Robe" (Northern Exposure), a 1994 television episode

== See also ==
- Robe (disambiguation)
