= William Livingstone Robe =

British Army officer

- Born: 1791; Woolwich, England
- Died: 19 June 1815 (aged 23 or 24); Near Waterloo, Belgium
- Relatives: William Robe (father)
- Military career
- Allegiance: United Kingdom
- Branch: British Army
- Service years: 1807–1815
- Rank: Lieutenant
- Unit: Royal Horse Artillery
- Conflicts: Peninsular War; Waterloo Campaign
- Awards: Mention in Despatches; Army Gold Medal (2 clasps); Waterloo Medal (posthumous)

Lieutenant William Livingstone Robe (1791 – 19 June 1815) was a British Army officer of the Royal Horse Artillery who was noted for his distinguished conduct in battles of the Peninsular War. He died at the Battle of Waterloo.

== Biography ==
Robe was born in 1791 in Woolwich, the son of then-First Lieutenant William Robe and his wife Sarah. He became a cadet at the Royal Military Academy at Woolwich on 9 April 1805, and obtained a commission as second lieutenant in the Royal Horse Artillery on 3 October 1807. That year, he accompanied the Royal Navy fleet that wintered in Gothenburg. He then went to Gibraltar, whence he volunteered for service in Portugal, and joined his father during the Battle of Vimeiro on 21 August 1808. He was promoted to be lieutenant on 28 June 1808.

Robe took part in Sir John Moore's retreat to Coruña, was engaged at the actions of Pombal, Sabugal, Fuentes d'Onore, El Boden, Badajos, Tarifa, Salamanca and the preceding attacks, Madrid, Burgos, Nivelle, Nive, Adour, and Bayonne. He was in no fewer than thirty-three actions as a subaltern, and was mentioned by Wellington for his distinguished conduct at Nivelle and Nive, where he commanded a mountain battery of artillery carried on mules.

Robe was one of the four officers of William Norman Ramsay's Troop of Horse Artillery struck down near La Haye Sainte, at the Battle of Waterloo, and died from the effects of his wounds on the following day, 19 June 1815. Just before his death, he sent a message to his father to assure him that he died like a soldier. The Army Gold Medal he had already been authorised, with clasps for the battles of Nivelle and Nive, and the posthumous Waterloo Medal, were sent after his death to his family. His fellow officers erected a monument to his memory in the church at Waterloo. An howitzer (one of 3), Portuguese in origin, taken by the French in the Peninsular, were carried off by Lt. Robe at Nive (1813), was engraved by his fellow officers and presented to his father by the MGO, Lord Musgrave, and now resides in a private collection in England.
