= Yellow Robe =

Yellow Robe is a surname. Notable people with the surname include:

- Chauncey Yellow Robe (1867–1930), Lakota educator, actor and activist
- Rosebud Yellow Robe (1907–1992), Lakota folklorist, educator and writer
- William S. Yellow Robe Jr. (1960–2021), Assiniboine actor, author, director, and educator
