= Benavides, León =

Benavides Banavices
- municipality
- Coat of arms

- Location within Spain
- Coordinates: 42°32′5″N 5°56′19″W
- Country: Spain
- Autonomous community: Castile and León
- Province: León
- Municipality: Benavides

Government
  - Mayor: Ana Rosa Sopeña Ballina (PP)

Area
  - Total: 74.07 km^{2} (28.60 sq mi)
- Elevation: 840 m (2,760 ft)

Population (2025-01-01)
  - Total: 2,321
  - Density: 31.34/km^{2} (81.16/sq mi)
- Demonym: Benavidense
- Time zone: UTC+1 (CET)
  - Summer (DST): UTC+2 (CEST)
- Postal Code: 24280
- Telephone prefix: 987
- Website: www.aytobenavides.es

Benavides (Spanish pronunciation: [benaˈβiðes]; also called Benavides de Órbigo, Leonese: Banavices) is a municipality in the province of León, Spain. It is part of the route of St. James. As of 2018, the population is 2497. The total area is 74.07 km (46.02 mi).
