= Maximilien Sébastien Foy =

French military leader (1775–1825)

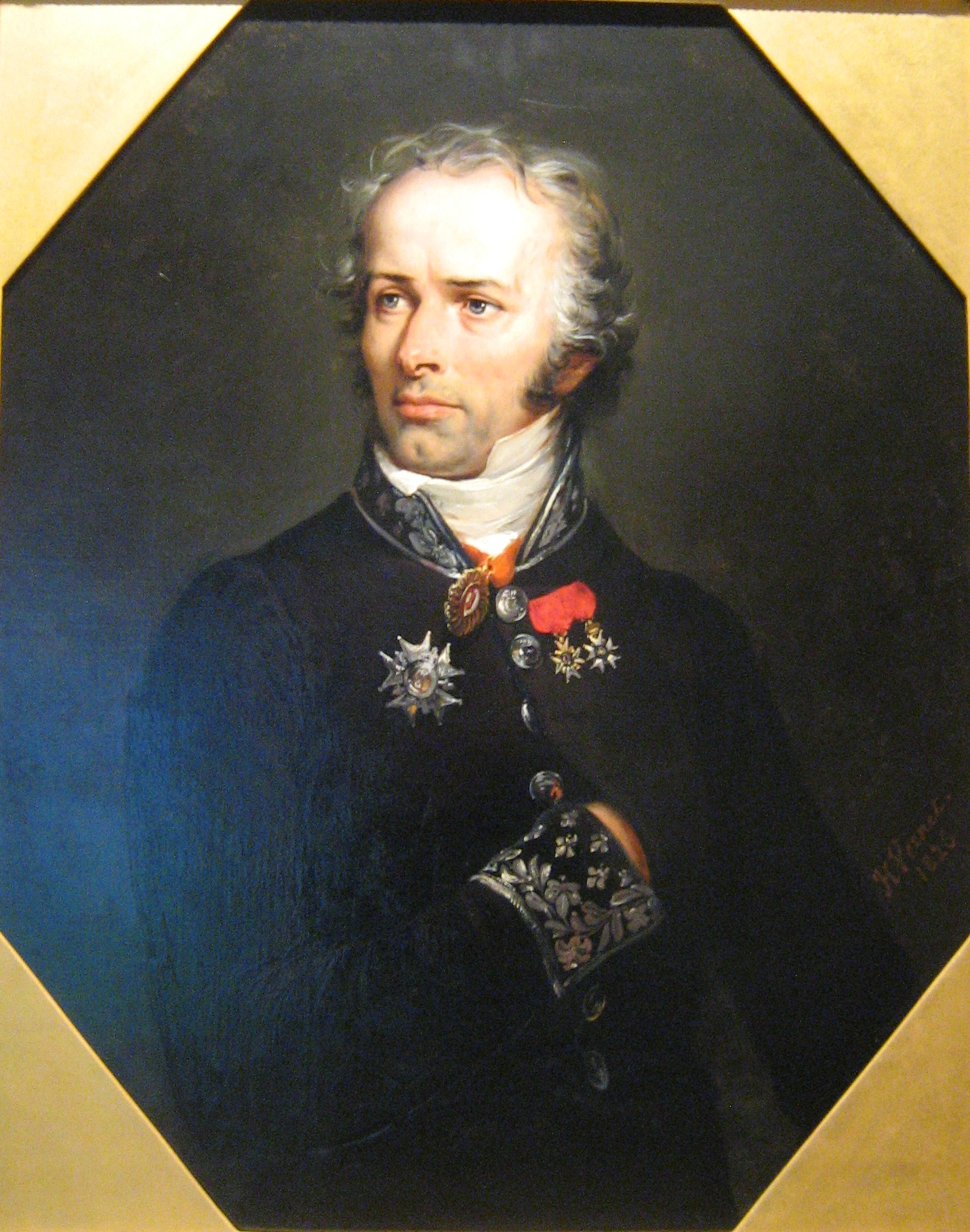
- Portrait by Horace Vernet
- Born: 3 February 1775; Ham, France
- Died: 28 November 1825 (aged 50); Paris, France
- Military career
- Allegiance: France
- Branch: Army
- Conflicts: French Revolutionary Wars; Battle of Valmy; Battle of Jemappes; First Battle of Zurich; Peninsular War; Battle of Bussaco; Battle of Salamanca; Battle of García Hernández; Battle of Tordesillas (1812); Battle of Vitoria; Battle of Orthez; War of the Seventh Coalition; Battle of Quatre Bras; Battle of Waterloo
- Awards: Legion of Honour

Maximilien Sébastien Foy (French pronunciation: [maksimiljɛ̃ sebastjɛ̃ fwa]; 3 February 1775 – 28 November 1825) was a French Army officer and politician who served in the French Revolutionary Wars and the Napoleonic Wars.

== Revolution ==
He was born in Ham, Somme, and educated in the military school of La Fere, and made sub-lieutenant of artillery in 1792. He was present at the battles of Valmy and Jemappes, and in 1793 obtained a company, as promotion was rapid in those days. In all the subsequent campaigns (including the First Battle of Zurich) he was actively employed under Dumouriez, Pichegru, Moreau, Masséna, and others.

== Early Empire ==
In 1803, he was colonel of the 5th regiment of horse artillery, and refused, from political principles, the appointment of aide-de-camp on Napoleon's assumption of the imperial throne. Nevertheless, he was employed in Auguste Marmont's II Corps and shared in the victories of Napoleon's brilliant 1805 Ulm Campaign in Germany. In 1806, he commanded the artillery of the army stationed in Friuli, for the purpose of occupying the Venetian territory incorporated by the treaty of Pressburg with the kingdom of Italy. In 1807, he was sent to Constantinople to introduce European tactics in the Turkish service, but this object was defeated by the death of Selim III and the opposition of the Janissaries.

== Service in Portugal ==
On Foy's return, the expedition against Portugal was preparing. He received a command in the artillery under Maj-Gen Jean-Andoche Junot in the first French invasion of Portugal. During the occupation of Portugal, he filled the post of inspector of forts and fortresses. He was severely wounded at the Battle of Vimeiro. After the Convention of Cintra, he returned to France, and with the same army proceeded to Spain. In November 1808, he was promoted to general of brigade and fought under the command of Marshal Nicolas Soult at the Battle of Corunna.

In early 1809, he led a brigade under Soult in the second French invasion of Portugal. When commanded to summon the Bishop of Porto to open the gates of Porto, he was seized, stripped by the populace and thrown into prison. He escaped with difficulty. At the Second Battle of Porto, he alertly spotted Arthur Wellesley's surprise river crossing. Leading the 17th Light Infantry in a futile attempt to drive the British back, Foy was wounded.

Foy was wounded again while leading his brigade at the Battle of Bussaco during the third French invasion of Portugal. In 1810, he made a skilful retreat at the head of 600 men, in the face of 6,000 Spaniards, across the Sierra de Caceres. Early in 1811, he was selected by Marshal André Masséna to convey to the emperor the critical state of the French army before the Lines of Torres Vedras. This commission, though one of great peril — the country being in a complete state of insurrection — Foy successfully accomplished, for which he was promoted to divisional general.

== Service in Spain ==
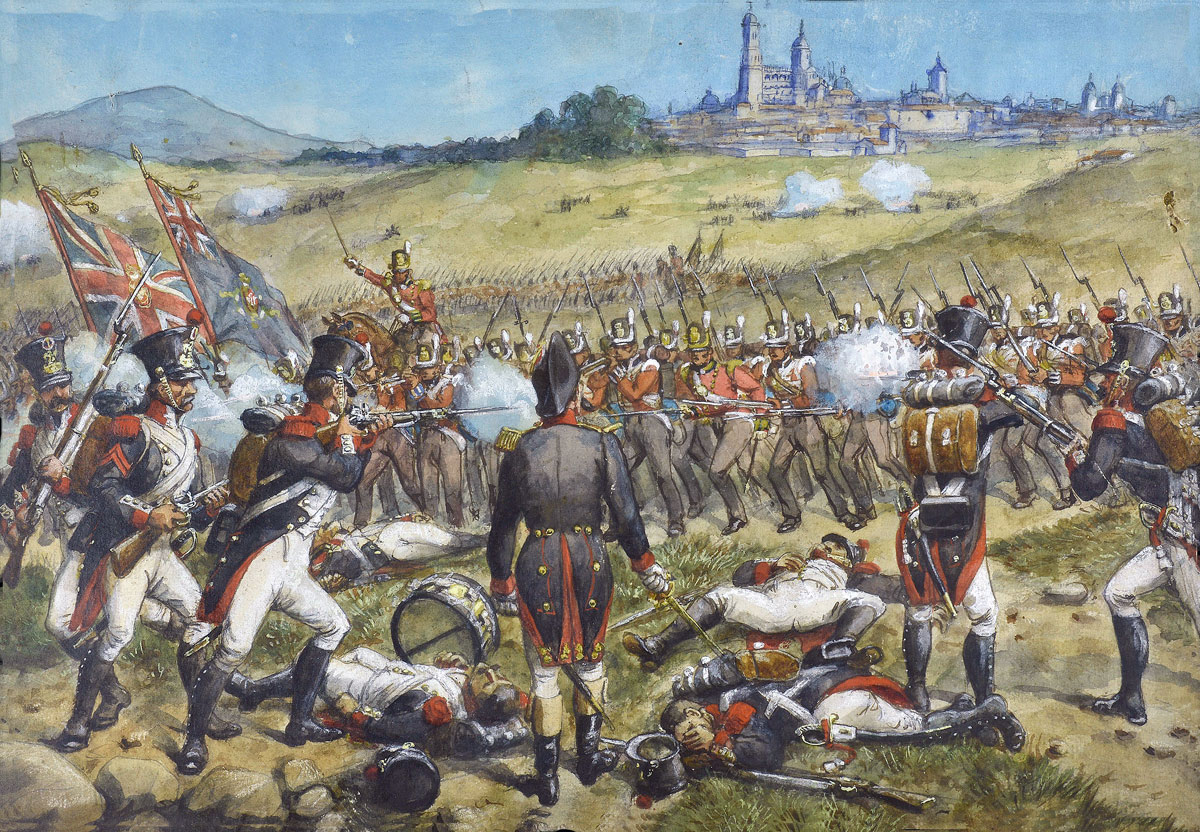
The Battle of Salamanca, where Foy covered the French army's retreat

In July 1812, Foy was in the Battle of Salamanca and covered the retreat of the defeated French army. He was one of those who, when Wellington raised the siege of Burgos and retreated to the Douro, hung upon his rear and took some prisoners and artillery, forcing to retreat.

On the news of the disasters in Russia and Wellington's consequent resumption of offensive movements, Foy was sent with his division beyond Vitoria to keep the different parties in check. After the Battle of Vitoria, at which he was not present, he collected 20,000 troops of different divisions at Bergana, and had some success in skirmishes with the Spanish corps forming the left wing of the allied army. He arrived at Tolosa about the same time as Lieut-Gen Thomas Graham. After a sanguinary contest in that town, retreated upon Irun, from which he was quickly dislodged, and finally recrossed the Bidassoa River.

Foy commanded a division in Marshal Soult's army during the Battle of the Pyrenees in July 1813. After Soult's defeat at Sorauren, Foy saved his division and parts of other commands by retreating northeast over the Roncesvalles Pass.

== Final career ==
In the Battle of the Nive on 9 December 1813 and the Battle of St. Pierre d'Irrube on the 13th, Foy distinguished himself. In the hard fought Battle of Orthez, on 27 February 1814, he was left apparently dead on the field. Before this period he had been made Count of the Empire and commander of the Legion of Honour. In March 1815, he was appointed inspector general of the fourteenth military division, but on the return of Napoleon, during the Hundred Days, he embraced the cause of the emperor. Foy commanded a division of infantry in the battles of Quatre Bras and Waterloo, at the last of which he received his fifteenth wound. This terminated his military career.

In 1819, he was elected a member of the Chamber of Deputies, the duties of which he discharged until his death in November 1825; and from his first entrance into the chamber, was distinguished for his eloquence, and quickly became the acknowledged leader of the opposition. Before his death he wrote a history of the Peninsular War.
