= Jean-André Valletaux =

French military commander

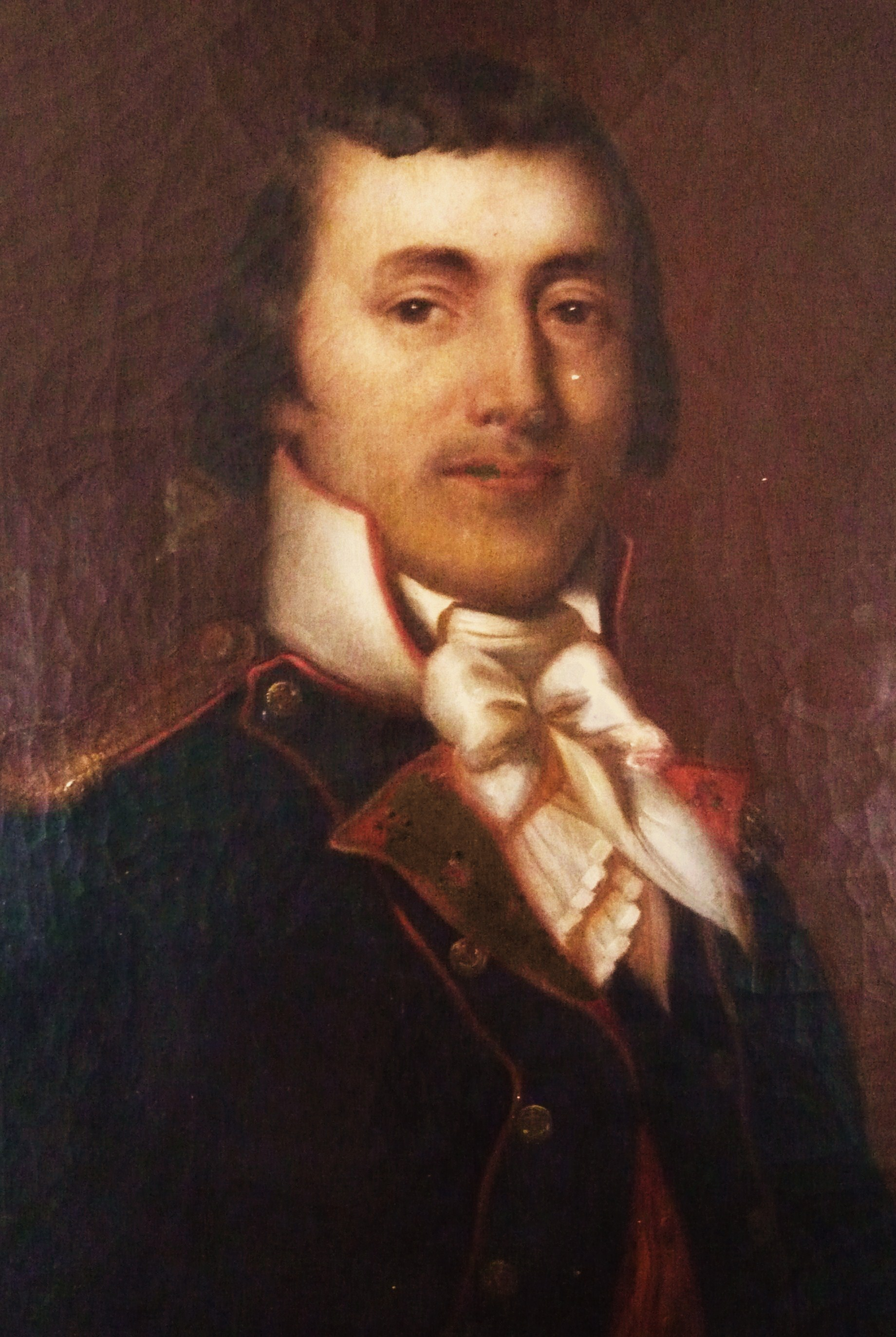
Jean-André Valletaux

Jean-André Valletaux (French pronunciation: [ʒɑ̃n‿ɑ̃dʁe valto]; 23 November 1773 in Hiersac – 23 June 1811 Cogorderos) was a French military commander during the French Revolutionary Wars and Napoleonic Wars, a brigadier in the Peninsular War, and Commander of the Legion of Honour.

Valletaux died as commander of the French forces at the Battle of Cogorderos, in Spain.

His name is inscribed under the Arc de Triomphe.

== Bibliography ==
- Gates, David (1986). The Spanish Ulcer: A History of the Peninsular War. Pimlico 2002. ISBN 0712697306
- Pope, Stephen (1999). The Cassel Dictionary of the Napoleonic Wars. Cassel. ISBN 0-304-35229-2.
- Schneid, Frederick C. (2011). The French Revolutionary and Napoleonic Wars. Mainz: Institute of European History.
