= Christopher Robe =

Christopher Robé is a professor in film and media studies at Florida Atlantic University. He has published Left of Hollywood: Cinema, Modernism, and the Emergence of U.S. Radical Film Culture., which resituates such well-known auteurs like Sergei Eisenstein and Jean Renoir in an American political context.. It also argues that the 1930s proved a vital moment in time regarding the emergence of Left Film Theory.

His book, Breaking the Spell: A History of Anarchist Filmmakers, Videotape Guerrillas, and Digital Ninjas., addresses the rise of video activism and the new anarchism from the 1970s to the present. Robé can be seen discussing the book in the following interview. His newest book, "Abolishing Surveillance: Digital Media Activism and State Repression" addresses how various communities like counter-summit protesters, cop watchers, Muslim American youth, and animal rights activists use video activism in their grassroots work to counter state repression and for self-determination. He can be seen speaking about his book here. He is also conducting archival-based research for a book on Raymond Williams that historically situates some of his key theoretical ideas in developing grassroots media with present-day concerns over the democratization of digital media. His collection co-edited with Stephen Charbonneau, "InsUrgent Media from the Front: A Media Activism Reader" was published in fall 2020 by Indiana University Press.

== Writing ==
He writes occasionally for Pop Matters and Cineaste:

The Alchemy of the Velvet Underground's Art:

Freedom Is An Endless Meeting: The Utopian Vision of Women Talking:

Disruptive Film and Political Turmoil: Disruptive Film and Political Turmoil

Adjusting the Focus on Somali-Americans: "First Person Plural" and "Muslim Youth Voices": Adjusting the Focus on Somali-Americans: 'First Person Plural' and 'Muslim Youth Voices'

Bill Gunn's 'Personal Problems' and a History of the Video Revolution: Bill Gunn's 'Personal Problems' and a History of the Video Revolution

Documenting the Little Abuses: Copwatching, Community Organizing, and Video Activism: Documenting the Little Abuses: Copwatching, Community Organizing, and Video Activism

Field of Vision: An Expedition in Short-Form Documentary Filmmaking: FieldofVision.pdf

Expanding Our Field of Vision: An Interview with Laura Poitras: ExpandOurField.pdf

The Watermelon Woman, or What Happened to New Queer Cinema: 'The Watermelon Woman', or, Whatever Happened to New Queer Cinema?

Disruptive Film: 'Disruptive Film' Creates a Constellation Where the Past and Present Meet

The Quay Brothers Collected Short Films: Pathological Visions: Desire and Alienation in the Films of the Quay Brothers

Two Days, One Night: The Dardennes' Laboring Body in 'Two Days, One Night'

Boyhood: 'Boyhood' and the Transcendence of the Everyday

Jean Luc-Godard, Introduction to a True History of Cinema: Jean-Luc Godard: A Montage of Attractions
