= Francisco Taboada y Gil =

Spanish military leader

Francisco Taboada y Gil (1752–1831) was a Spanish military commander.

== Early career ==
Taboada enlisted as a Fusilier lieutenant in the Provincial Regiment of Santiago de Compostela in 1769, and was promoted to Rifleman lieutenant in 1770 and Fusilier captain in 1778. In 1786 he was appointed lieutenant colonel of his regiment and colonel in 1787, and over the following two and a half years he commanded garrisons at La Coruña and Ares.

== Peninsular War ==
On 29 July 1810, Taboada, having taken command of Echevarria's brigade based at Puebla de Sanabria, numbering some 200 men, was driven from the town by the 5,000 French troops led by General Serras, who had set out from his headquarters at Benavente with the intention of threatening the frontier of the Tras-os-Montes, in the north of Portugal. General Silveira then gathered all the Portuguese militia of his district at Braganza to defend the frontier. But instead of advancing, Serras turned back, left some 400–600 troops (a battalion of the 2nd Swiss Regiment and a squadron of horse) at Puebla de Sanabria, and withdrew to Zamora. As soon as he was far enough away, Silveira and Taboada united their forces and, on 4 August, attacked the French force that had been left in the town, routing it. The French troops finally surrendered some six days later, about 20 officers and 350 men, all that remained of the original force, being taken prisoners. Serras, on learning of the attack, hurried back but found Puebla de Sanabria empty, for the allies forces had made off with their prisoners and taken to the mountains. Serra then went back to Benavente, and Taboada reoccupied Puebla de Sanabria, where he remained, unopposed.

On 23 June 1811, Taboada's troops defeated the French general Jean-André Valletaux, who was killed, at the Battle of Cogorderos.

== Post-war career ==
Taboada was promoted to lieutenant general in October 1816.
