= Siege of Astorga =

1810 siege during the Peninsular War

- Part of the Peninsular War
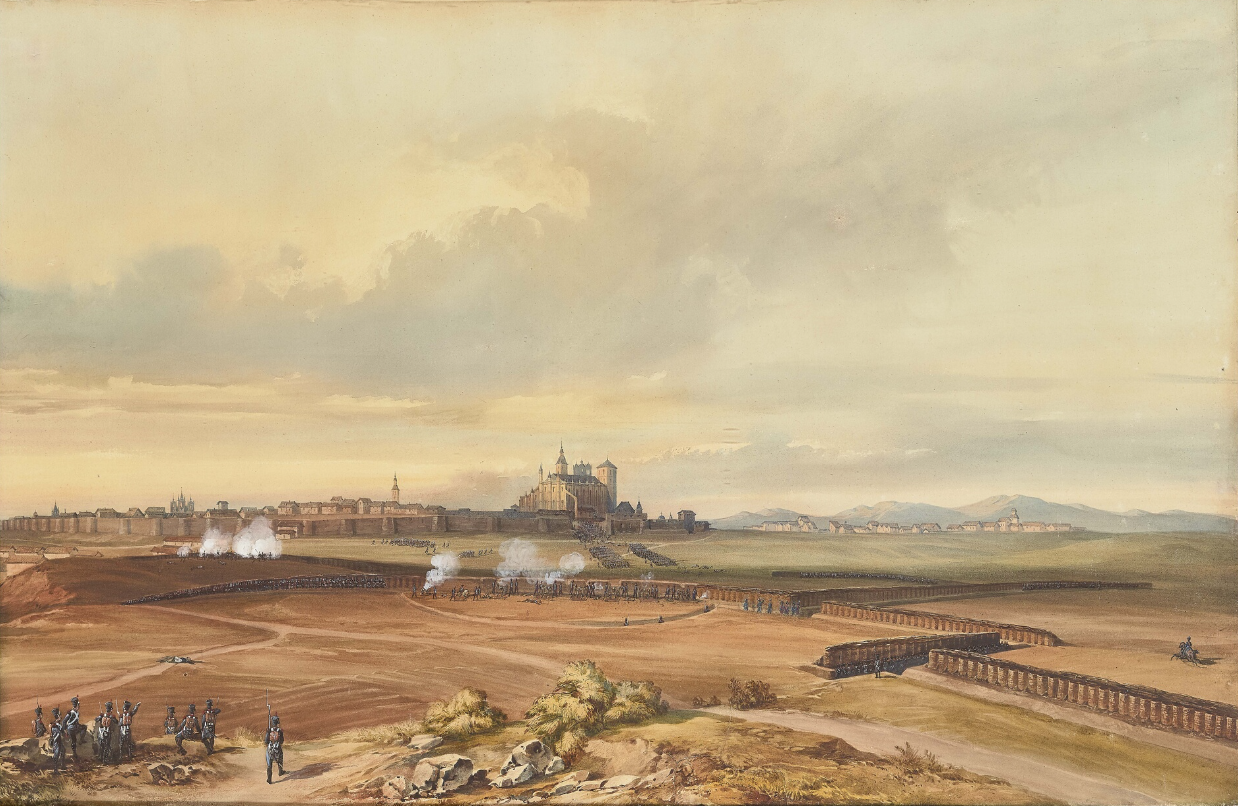
- Astorga is stormed on 21 April 1810 at 7 in the evening by Siméon Fort, 1841-1842
Date	21 March – 22 April 1810
Location	Astorga, Castile and León, Spain 42°27′30″N 6°3′30″W
Result	French victory

Belligerents
France	Spain

Commanders and leaders
(First French Empire) André Masséna (First French Empire) Jean-Andoche Junot	(Spain) José María Santocildes

Strength
27,000	2,800

Casualties and losses
800	2,800

Peninsular War: Third French invasion
current battle

The siege of Astorga was an attempt by French forces to capture Astorga, Spain in a campaign of the Peninsular War. Astorga was located on the flank of the French invasion of Spain and Portugal, and was meant to be used as a headquarters during the campaign. For several weeks no attack took place, as neither side had artillery enough to fight well. Shortly after the French guns arrived, however, a hole was made in the wall and the city fell shortly thereafter. The French overpowered the Spanish garrison inside and took the city on 22 April 1810.

== Location ==
Astorga is located in the province of León, in northwest Spain. Because of its location, it sat on the flank of the French army as they advanced into Spain, and then invaded Portugal. The city was built into a hill, part of the Manzanal mountains; and therefore was provided with natural defenses. The French had already been defeated once trying to take the city, in September 1809, after which General La Romana repaired the walls of the city and built up its defenses.

== Forces ==
The French forces, part of André Masséna's army, were led by Jean-Andoche Junot. Junot arrived at Astorga on March 21 with Napoleon's 8th corps, consisting of 12,000 men, including 1,200 cavalry forces. Junot's forces included the Irish Legion; they had joined earlier that month. Astorga would be the first action for the Second Battalion of the Legion. Junot placed Bertrand Clauzel's division in the position Loison had held, with Solignac in support, and St. Croix to watch the rear.

== Campaign ==
General Loison attempted to take the city in February 1810, as it was meant to be his headquarters during the invasion of Portugal; but was unprepared to attack the defenses he found there, and was forced to retreat. Junot's troops came to assist Loison, but brought no siege guns with them; It took Junot weeks to gather enough artillery to assault the town. In the meantime, the French forces dug trenches to besiege the town. Incidentally, the English and Spanish troops under Wellington had the same troubles when they recaptured the city in 1812. The garrison in Astorga had no siege guns, either: for several weeks there was a standoff. During these weeks, Santocildes emptied the town of 3,000 of its residents and stocked up on supplies for the siege, which began on March 21 of 1810. The Spanish could expect no hope from Wellington's forces, which remained in Portugal. Until the siege guns arrived, there was no action except nuisance fire from what little artillery Junot had, and skirmish parties sent out from Astorga.

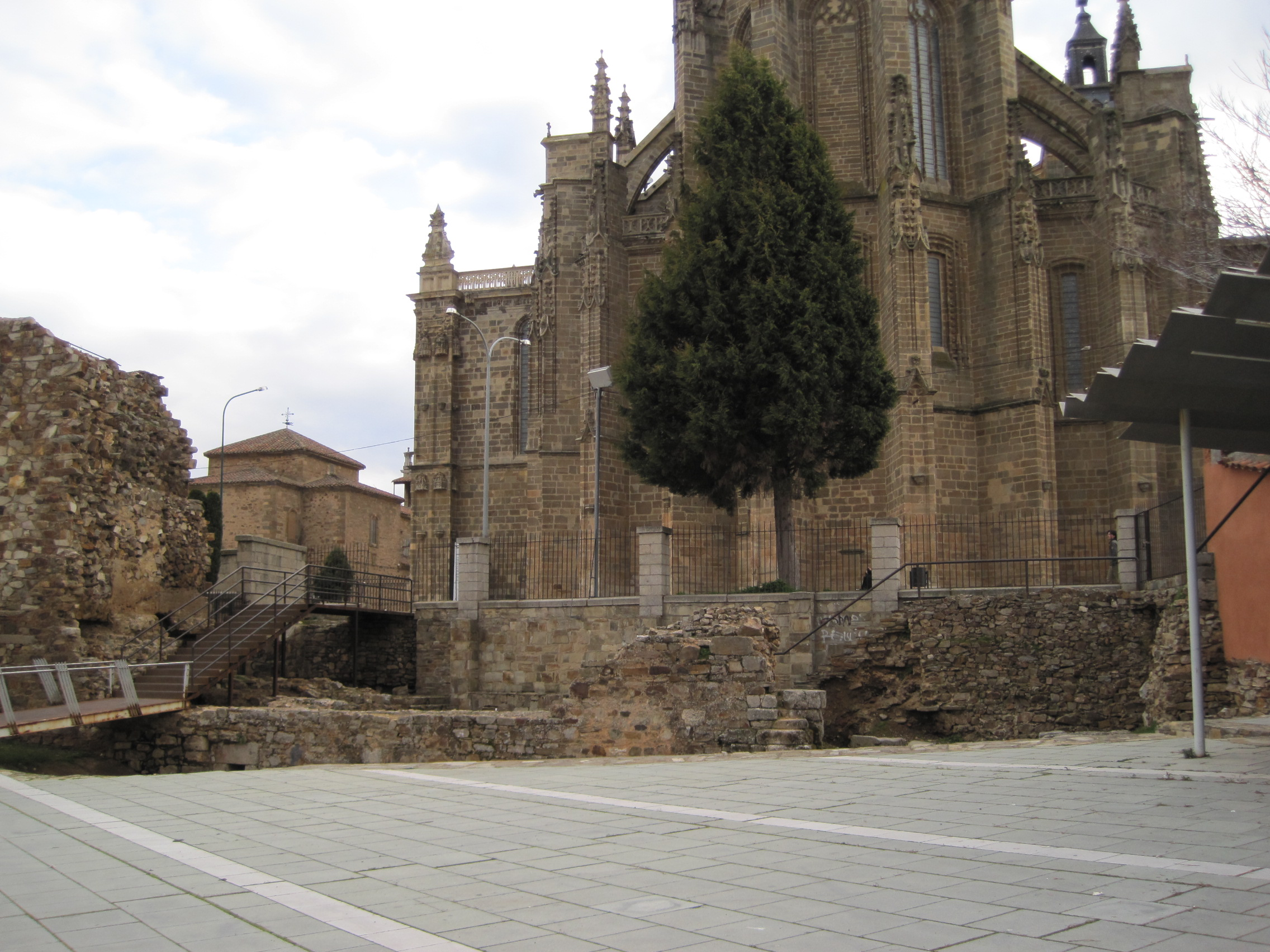
Part of the city walls where the French troops breached

Junot's 18 siege guns arrived on April 15 from Valladolid, and by the 20th, the wall of the city was breached. The French stormed the city the next evening; however, their first attack was repulsed at the cost of 300 men. Those of the storming company who were not killed holed up just inside the wall and held the position for the night. The next morning, Santocildes surrendered as the French were preparing for another attack.

== Aftermath ==
Santocildes was almost out of ammunition when he surrendered: he had fewer than 30 rounds of ammunition left per man, and only 8 rounds of artillery. He gave the French 2,500 prisoners and the city, but cost the French 160 men, with 400 wounded. His garrison lost only 51 dead and 109 wounded. Most of the French casualties came in the assault on the breach. The Irish Legion led the charge over the wall, and suffered heavy losses: Captain John Allen's company's drummer boy continued to beat the charge after having lost both legs, for which he was given the French Legion of Honor.

== Notes ==
Preceded by Siege of Cádiz	Napoleonic Wars; Siege of Astorga	Succeeded by Siege of Ciudad Rodrigo (1810)
