= Jean-Louis Dubreton =

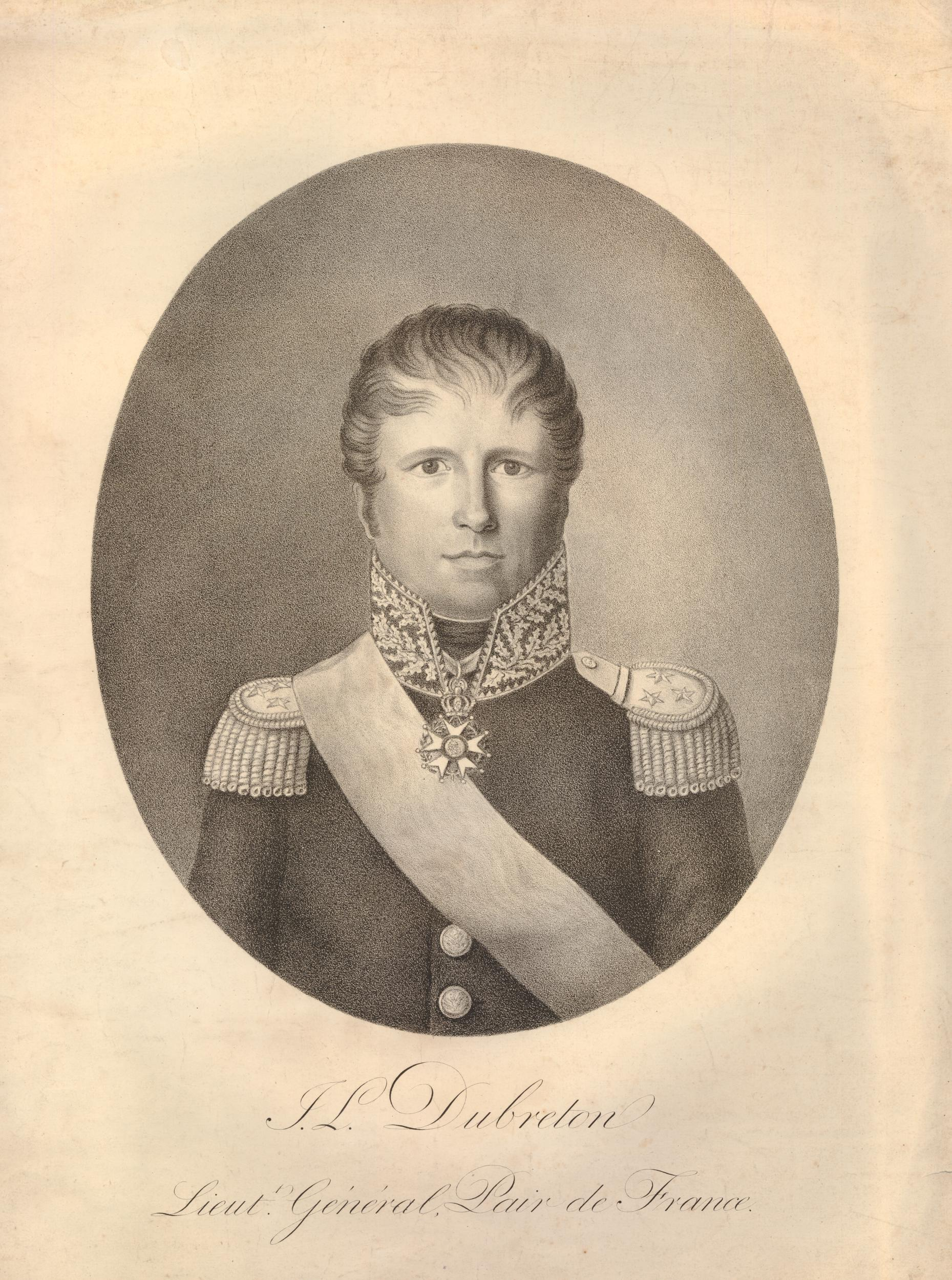
- Born: 18 January 1773; Ploërmel, Brittany, France
- Died: 27 May 1855 (aged 82) Versailles, France
- Allegiance: France
- Branch: Infantry
- Service years: 1790–1819
- Rank: General of Division
- Conflicts: French Revolutionary Wars; Napoleonic Wars; Peninsular War; • Siege of Burgos
- Awards: Légion d'Honneur; Order of Saint-Louis
- Other work: Chamber of Peers (1819)

Jean-Louis Dubreton (French pronunciation: [ʒɑ̃ lwi dybʁətɔ̃]; 18 January 1773 – 27 May 1855) enlisted in the French army in 1790 and served during the French Revolutionary Wars where he gained advancement. During the War of the First Coalition he fought against the allies in the north and against the War in the Vendée. By 1801 he commanded a battalion in Italy. The year 1803 found him leading a regiment during the failed French occupation of Santo Domingo.

During the Napoleonic Wars, Dubreton served in Holland and Germany, becoming a general officer in 1811. Later he transferred to Spain where he won fame by leading the defenders during the Siege of Burgos, one of Wellington's rare setbacks. Promoted, he commanded a division at Dresden, Leipzig, and Hanau in the autumn of 1813. King Louis XVIII appointed him to several military posts and, in 1819, to the Chamber of Peers, a lawmaking body. Dubreton is one of the names inscribed under the Arc de Triomphe on Column 35.
