= General Slade =

General Slade may refer to:

- John Ramsay Slade (1843–1913), British Army major general
- Sir John Slade, 1st Baronet (1762–1859), British Army general
- Marcus Slade (1801–1872), British Army lieutenant general
