= André Thomas Perreimond =

French general (1766–1844)

- Born: 2 October 1766; Vidauban, Var, Kingdom of France
- Died: 2 January 1844 (aged 77) Toulon, French Empire
- Branch: Cavalry
- Rank: Général de division
- Conflicts: War of the First Coalition; Battle of Kaiserslautern; Peninsular War; Battle of Villagarcia; Battle of Maguilla
- Awards: Officier of the Legion of Honour

André Thomas Perreimond (Note: In his A History of the Peninsular War, Charles Oman refers to him both as Perreimond (Oman 1902, p. 644 & 1903, p. 6) and as Perreymond (Oman 1908, p. 118 & 1911, p. 638); Le Marchant (1841) referred to him as Peyremmont.) (2 October 1766 – 2 January 1844) was a French cavalry officer who saw service in several armed conflicts, including the Peninsular War.

In the biography of the British cavalry commander John Le Marchant, his nephew Denis Le Marchant referred to Perreimond "as a soldier of acknowledged gallantry, who prided himself on his knowledge of his profession; but he was of a vain-glorious disposition, and entertained an utter contempt for the English cavalry...".

== Career ==
=== Peninsular War ===
==== 1808 ====
Towards the end of 1808, Perreimond led one of the three brigades of Latour-Maubourg's 3,695-sabre-strong Division of Dragoons that formed the Reserve of Cavalry of the French Army of Spain.

That Christmas, the Duke of Infantado sent his vanguard, together with the greater part of his cavalry, under General Venegas, to surprise the two regiments of Perreimond's brigade of dragoons at Tarancón and cut their the line of retreat. Perreimond charged the Spanish line of battalion squares and was able to get through with the loss of fifty or sixty men.

==== 1809 ====
Following the death of Antoine Paris d'Illins at Ocaña in November, Perreimond was given the cavalry brigade of the 4th Corps. His three regiments of Light Horse were stationed at Madridejos.

With the defeat of the Spanish troops at Ocaña, the way was now open for the French to invade Andalucía in three large columns; the first, through Almodóvar to Andújar; the second through Valdepeñas, and the third, 10,000 troops led by Sebastiani on the left flank, through Tomelloso towards Montizón, to cut off the Spanish army's retreat towards Murcia.

==== 1810 ====
According to the morning states of January 15, at the French War Office, Perreimond's Light Horse, consisted of 1,349 sabres. Perreimond had arrived at Tomelloso with his Light Horse on 6 January 1810, followed three days later by the column led by Sébastiani and Louis de Bouillé. The French troops stayed in the town for another two days waiting to be joined by General Milhaud's 1,721 Dragoons before proceeding.

==== 1811 ====
On 15 July 1811, Perreimond's Light Cavalry, made up of the 2nd Hussars and the 5th Chasseurs, numbered 1,015 men present under arms. The unit was part of Marshal Victor's 1st Corps of Marshal Soult's Army of the South.

==== 1812 ====
Following the reorganisation of the Army of the South, the returns for 1 March 1812 had the 1st Division of Cavalry headquartered at Ribera, in Estremadura, with Perreimond's 1st Brigade, made up of the 2nd Hussars, the 21st Chasseurs and the 26th Dragoons, and Bonnemains' 2nd Brigade, made up of the 5th Chasseurs and the 27th Chasseurs.

In April, cavalry units led by Perreimond and Charles Lallemand were defeated at Villagarcia.

In June, Perreimond and Lallemand saw action at Maguilla, under Comte d'Erlon.

The following October, Perreimond's Cavalry Division (144 officers and 2,349 men in 20 squadrons) made up of the 2nd Hussars, 5th, 10th, 21st, 27th Chasseurs, 7th Lancers, would be one of the three cavalry divisions of Marshal Soult's Army of the South. Later that month, Perreimond's Chasseurs chased Freire's Murcian cavalry out of Tarancón.
