= Charles Murray Marling =

British diplomat (1862–1933)

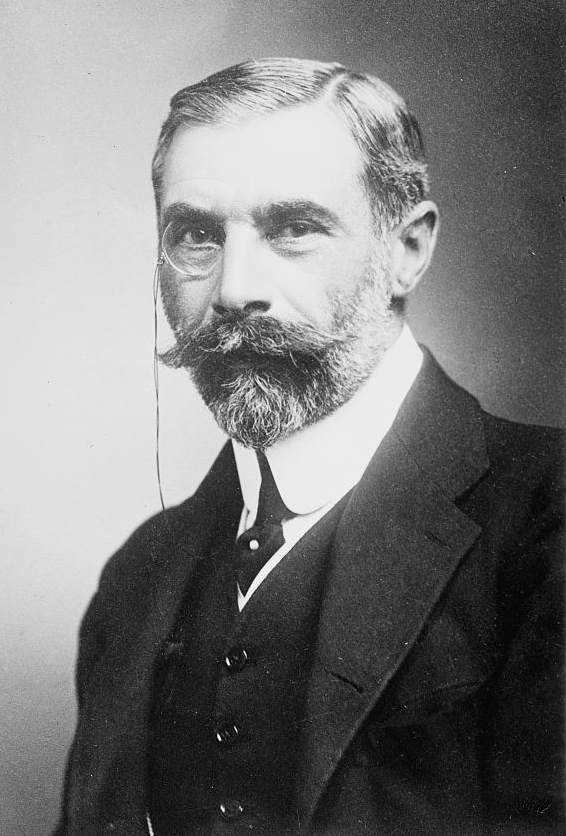

Sir Charles Murray Marling GCMG CB (3 December 1862 – 17 February 1933) was a British diplomat.

== Early life ==
Marling was born on 3 December 1862 in the village of King's Stanley near Stroud, Gloucestershire, the second son of Sir William Marling, 2nd Baronet. His brother was Percival Marling who was awarded the Victoria Cross. He was educated at Wellington and Trinity College, Cambridge before joining the Diplomatic Service in 1888. He rose through the ranks, being appointed Third Secretary in 1890, Second Secretary in 1894, First Secretary in 1904, and Councillor of Embassy in 1906.

== Diplomat ==
He was the British Envoy Extraordinary and Minister Plenipotentiary to Persia from 1916 to 1918, having acted in a temporary capacity there since 1915.

On 4 March 1919 he was appointed as the British Ambassador to Denmark.

From 1921 he was British Ambassador to the Netherlands from where he retired five years later, he was promoted to Knight Grand Cross of the Order of St Michael and St George.

== Honours ==
- He was awarded the Grand Cross of Order of the Dannebrog for service in Denmark.
- He was appointed a Commander of the Order of St Michael and St George (CMG) in 1908.
- He was appointed a Companion of the Order of the Bath (CB) in the 1911 Coronation Honours.
- In the 1916 Birthday Honours he was promoted to Knight Commander of the Order of St Michael and St George (KCMG).
- In the 1926 Birthday Honours he was promoted to Knight Grand Cross of the Order of St Michael and St George (GCMG).

== Family life ==
In 1909, Marling married Lucia Slade, the only daughter of Sir John Ramsay Slade and granddaughter of Marcus Slade. They had two daughters and a son. Lucia died in 1927 in a motoring accident at Dieppe, France. Marling died at his London home on 16 February 1933 aged 70.

Diplomatic posts
| Preceded by Sir Walter Townley | Envoy Extraordinary and Minister Plenipotentiary to His Imperial Majesty the Shah of Persia; 1915–1918 | Succeeded by Sir Percy Cox |
| Preceded by Ralph Spencer Paget | Envoy Extraordinary and Minister Plenipotentiary of the United Kingdom to the Kingdom of Denmark; 1919–1921 | Succeeded by The Earl Granville |
| Preceded by Sir Ronald Graham | Envoy Extraordinary and Minister Plenipotentiary of the United Kingdom to the Kingdom of the Netherlands; 1921–1926 | Succeeded by The Earl Granville |
