= Battle of Villagarcia =

1812 battle of the Peninsular War

- Part of the Peninsular War
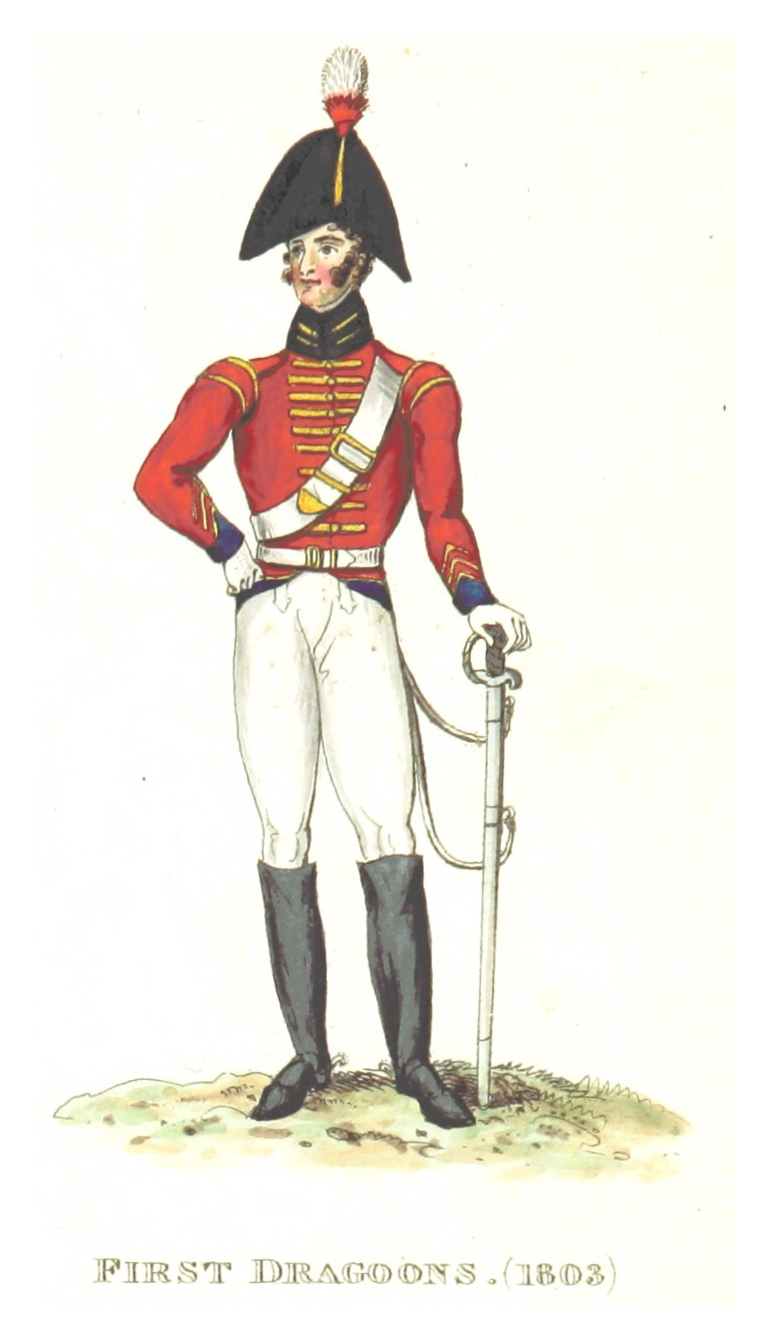
- A British heavy dragoon of the era
Date	11 April 1812
Location	Villagarcia de la Torre, Spain 38°17′N 06°04′W
Result	British victory

Belligerents
Great Britain	France

Commanders and leaders
Stapleton Cotton; John Le Marchant	François Antoine Lallemand

Strength
1,400	1,100

Casualties and losses
51 killed or wounded	53 killed or wounded 136 captured

The Battle of Villagarcia (Note: Also known as the Battle of Llerena) took place on 11 April 1812, near the village of Villagarcia de la Torre in Spain. Part of the Peninsular War, British cavalry under Sir Stapleton Cotton routed a French cavalry force led by Charles Lallemand.

The French cavalry had become isolated from the main body of their army, and Stapleton tried to cut them off through simultaneous frontal and flank attacks. The plan came close to disaster when troops making the frontal assault did so prematurely, before the situation was saved by the arrival of forces under John Le Marchant on the French left.

Casualties were roughly similar on both sides, but the French were forced to retreat and lost 136 prisoners.

== Background ==
The capture of Badajoz on 6 April 1812 allowed Wellington's Anglo-Portuguese Army to take the offensive. Prior to moving the bulk of his forces north where he would launch his Salamanca campaign Wellington entrusted a considerable proportion of his available cavalry to a force under General Sir Rowland Hill who was ordered to drive the retreating French army of Marshal Soult, who had failed in his attempt to relieve Badajoz, back into Andalusia to the south. The French rearguard under General D'Erlon were under orders to fall back towards Seville if pressed hard. Hill's cavalry, under Sir Stapleton Cotton, were indeed pressing those French forces still remaining in the province of Extremadura hard.

Cotton had two brigades of heavy cavalry available, commanded by John Le Marchant, (Note: 3rd and 4th Dragoons and 5th Dragoon Guards) and Sir John Slade (Note: 1st Dragoons, 3rd and 4th Dragoon Guards) respectively, as well as one of light cavalry under Frederick Ponsonby (Note: 12th, 14th and 16th Light Dragoons). Only Ponsonby's brigade and the 5th Dragoon Guards were involved in the fighting. The French cavalry attached to D'Erlon's two infantry divisions was commanded by Charles Lallemand, and was composed of the 2nd Hussars and the 17th and 27th Dragoons.

== Battle ==
On the evening of 10 April 1811, General Cotton climbed the steeple of a church in Bienvenida. He knew that the French were occupying Llerena and saw that there were considerable numbers of cavalry five miles closer to him near the village of Villagarcia. Cotton decided that he should attempt to trap the French cavalry with his superior forces. During the night he despatched Ponsonby with the 12th and 14th Light Dragoons to probe the Villagarcia area, whilst Le Marchant was sent on a circuitous march to get on the French left flank and, it was hoped, cut off their retreat. Slade was also instructed to concentrate his brigade on Bienvenida, though he seems to have been tardy in moving. Cotton retained the 16th Light Dragoons as a reserve. At some time during the night Cotton realised that Ponsonby's force might alert the French before Le Marchant was within striking distance and despatched an aide-de-camp with orders to halt the light cavalry; unfortunately the order arrived too late.

Peninsular War
Castile 1811–13
current battle

Two squadrons of the British light cavalry had forced the French vedettes out of the village of Villagarcia but, around dawn, had run into the full force of the French cavalry and were then chased back. Ponsonby subsequently found his two regiments faced by the three strong regiments under Lallemand and had to make a controlled withdrawal whilst skirmishing against heavy odds.

As ordered, during the night Le Marchant had moved his brigade over tortuous terrain for a considerable distance. Coming down from rugged hills bordering the plain where the action was fought Le Marchant and the 5th Dragoon Guards had pulled considerably ahead of the other two regiments of the brigade. Looking through the trees of the wood his men were moving through, Le Marchant noticed French cavalry, drawn up in two deep columns, were pushing the six squadrons of light dragoons back towards a narrow ravine flanked by stone walls. He realised an immediate charge was needed, before Ponsonby's squadrons were forced into the congested and broken ground to their rear.

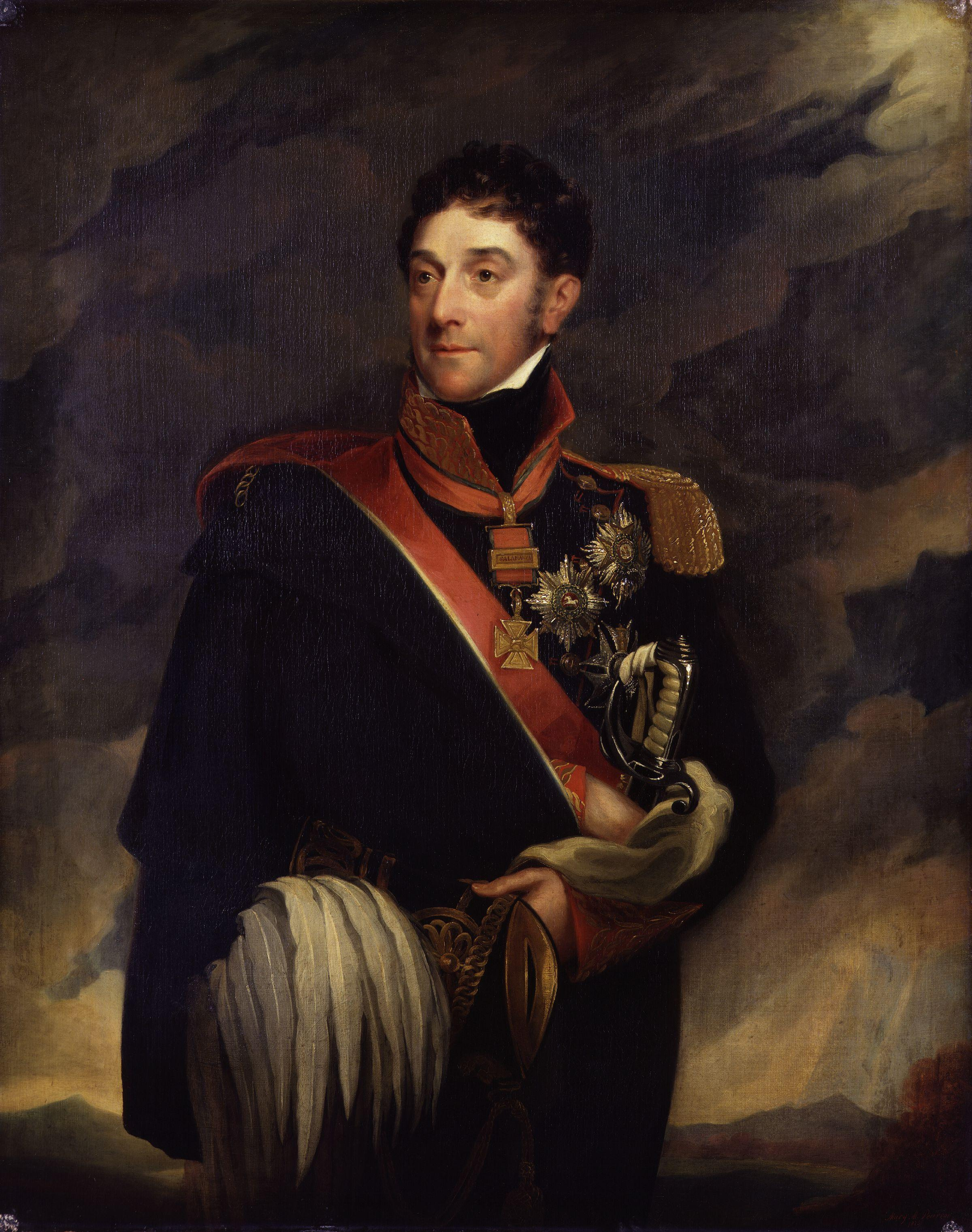
Stapleton Cotton

Lallemand reportedly caught a glimpse of red-coated figures in the woods to his left and rode to alert General André Thomas Perreimond (referred to as Peyremmont, in British sources), leading the 2nd Hussars. Perreimond ignored his concerns, claiming the British dragoons were probably a small detachment who had lost their way.

At this point the advantage that the French had enjoyed in the action was suddenly reversed. Le Marchant led his dragoon guards out of the woods and they formed their ranks whilst accelerating into the charge. The 5th Dragoon Guards attacked with their squadrons in echelon, their left refused, and struck the deep and exposed left flank of the French formation to considerable effect. Simultaneously with Le Marchant's charge the 16th Light Dragoons, led by Cotton, appeared to Ponsonby's right-rear; they jumped a stone wall in line, and also charged. The French cavalry were thrown into instant confusion and were swiftly broken.

The British pursuit, continuing to inflict casualties and take prisoners, was conducted all the way back to the walls of Llerena where the bulk of D'Erlon's force was concentrated. The French rallied briefly at a ditch halfway to Llerena, but they were outflanked by the 16th Light Dragoons and were forced into flight once more. A few hours later the French abandoned Llerena and continued their retreat out of Extremadura.

== Aftermath ==
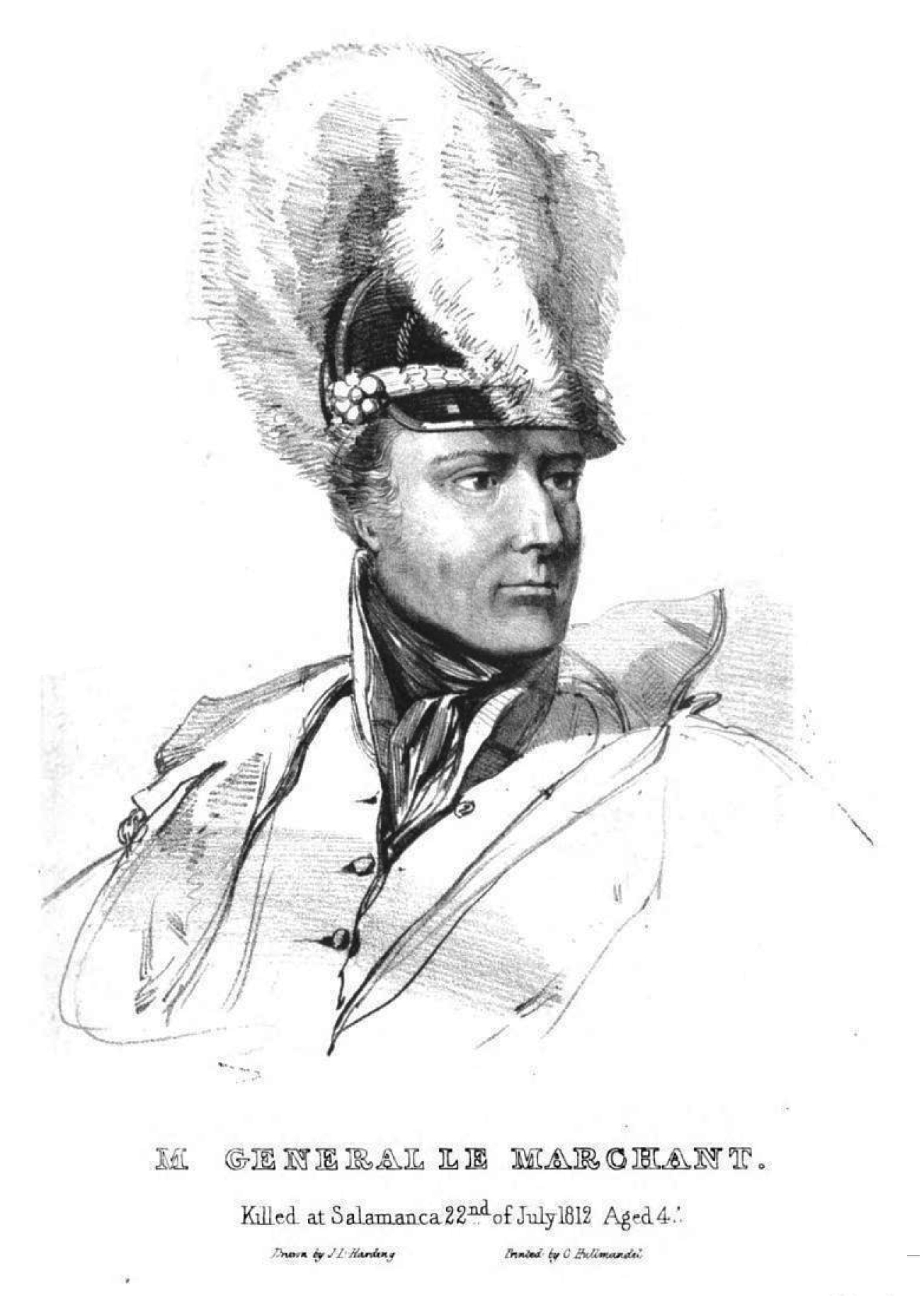
John Le Marchant

The French lost 53 killed or wounded, plus 136 captured (including four officers, one of whom was a lieutenant colonel) and were forced to leave Extremadura. The British lost 51 troopers killed or wounded. Cotton had shown initiative in conceiving a plan to trap the French cavalry, however, the plan was wholly reliant on the timing of the movements on the flanks coinciding with those of the centre. As a result, it was probably rather too complex and came dangerously close to breaking down in execution. However, Cotton was flexible in extemporising once his original plan was rendered irrelevant when his central force made its presence known to the enemy too soon. Slade's heavy brigade did not make an appearance at all. In his first major action as a general, Le Merchant proved as able a commander of cavalry in the field as he was a military innovator and educator.

== Sources ==
- Fletcher, I. (1999). Galloping at Everything: The British Cavalry in the Peninsula and at Waterloo 1808-15. Spellmount, Staplehurst. ISBN 1-86227-016-3.
- Le Marchant, Denis (1841). Memoirs of the Late Major General Le Marchant. London.
- Smith, D. le (1998). The Napoleonic Wars Data Book. Greenhill. ISBN 1853672769.
- Thoumine, R. H. (1968). Scientific Soldier, A Life of General Le Marchan 1766–1812. Oxford U. Press.
