= Battle of Almaraz =

1812 battle during the Peninsular War

- Part of the Peninsular War
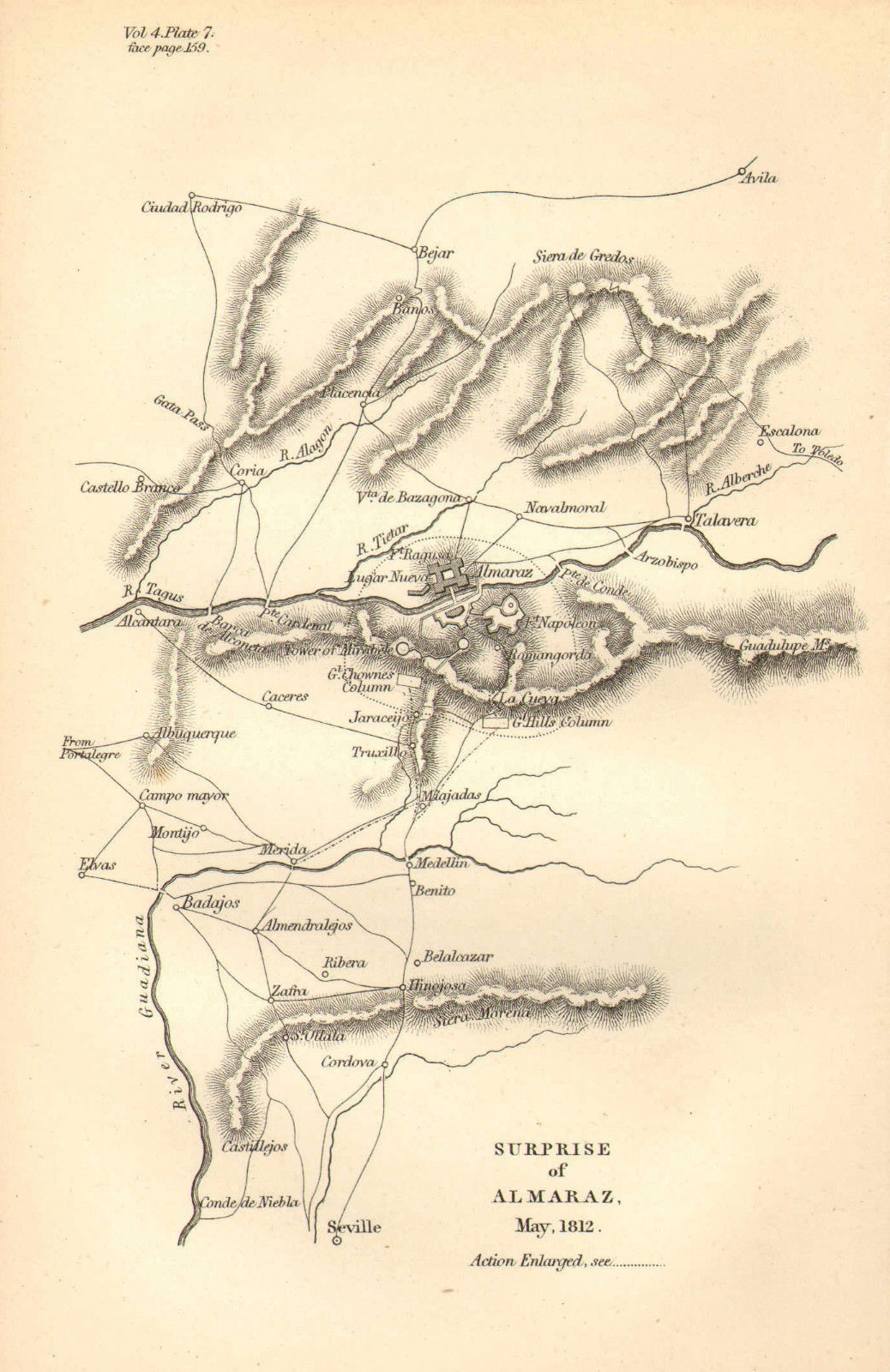
Date	18–19 May 1812
Location	Almaraz, Spain 39°48′N 5°40′W
Result	Anglo-Portuguese victory

Belligerents
(First French Empire) France	United Kingdom; Portugal

Commanders and leaders
(First French Empire) Colonel Aubert †	(United Kingdom of Great Britain and Ireland) Rowland Hill

Strength
1,100	6,000; 9 guns

Casualties and losses
150 killed or wounded 259 captured	33 killed 156 wounded

Peninsular War
Castile 1811–13
current battle

The Battle of Almaraz was fought during the Peninsular War on 18–19 May 1812, in which the Anglo-Portuguese Army under Lord Hill destroyed a French pontoon bridge across the River Tagus, in Almaraz, Spain. The bridge was protected by two French garrisons at either end.

The action was swift-moving, deceptive, and daring. The decisive result produced a substantial improvement in the Allied position by keeping French forces separated ahead of the imminent Battle of Salamanca.

== Background ==
By late April 1812, the Duke of Wellington had successfully captured the strategic border fortresses of Badajoz and Ciudad Rodrigo, commanding the two major routes between Spain and Portugal. He now prepared to advance into Spain with the largest army he had commanded to date, which was strong enough to take on any French army. There were two French armies in Spain, however: Marmont's Army of Portugal, garrisoned near Salamanca, and Soult's Army of the South. The Tagus River separated the two armies.

The only bridges over the Tagus were at Toledo, Talavera, Arzobispo, Almaraz, and Alcántara. The Alcántara Bridge had been destroyed by the Portuguese, under Col. Mayne, on 14 May 1809. The bridges at Toledo, Talavera, and Arzobispo were under French control, but according to Napier, the left bank of the Tagus at Talavera and Arzobispo was "so crowded by the rugged shoots of the Sierra de Guadalupe, that it may be broadly stated as impassable for an army". Any artillery and heavy baggage moving between the two armies would have to cross at Toledo or Almaraz.

== The battle ==
The latter bridge, built by the city of Plasencia under the reign of Emperor Charles V in the 16th century and known by the local people as the Albalat Bridge, was partially destroyed by the Spanish on 14 March 1809, to prevent its use by the French. The Portuguese under Colonel Mayne destroyed the bridge at Alcantara on 14 May 1809, for the same reason. The French built a pontoon bridge in the autumn of 1809, just west of the Albalat bridge. It was about 200 metres long and built with heavy pontoons. The central span was a light boat, designed to be removed at night for security.

General Rowland Hill was detached with his 2nd Division to attack the pontoon bridge over the Tagus. His force, numbering around 6000 men with nine guns, was virtually the same as that which surprised Jean-Baptiste Girard at the Battle of Arroyo dos Molinos, in 1811. The task facing Hill was a considerable one as the bridge of boats was protected on both banks by strong earthworks. The southern end of the bridge was protected by a bridge-head that was overlooked by Fort Napoleon.

Fort Napoleon was a strong fort, capable of holding 450 men and situated atop a hill above a steep embankment. It was not a difficult climb for any attacking troops, however, and entry into the fort was eased slightly by two large scarps, rather like steps, which led onto the fort's ramparts. The rear of the fort sloped down to the bridge-head and was protected by a palisaded ditch and loop-holed tower that would act as the last place of refuge should Hill's men gain entry into the fort. On the northern bank of the Tagus stood Fort Ragusa, in which was stored all the garrison's supplies and ammunition. This five-sided fort also had a 25-foot high, loop-holed tower that was to be the last place of defence. This fort was also covered by a field work close to the bridge.

The French had further strengthened the position at the bridge by securing the main road from Trujillo at a point about six miles south of the bridge. Here, where the road ascends the Sierra de Mirabete, the pass was commanded by a castle around which the French had built a 12-foot-high (3.7 m) rampart that housed eight guns. This was connected to a fortified house close to the road by two small works, Forts Colbert and Senarmont. The mountains were impassable to any wheeled vehicles, and the only other pass through the mountains, La Cueva, was two miles to the east of Mirabete. The road on the southern side of the mountains was passable to vehicles, but once through the pass the road deteriorated into little more than a footpath.

Hill's plan involved dividing his force into three columns. The first, comprising the 28th, 34th, and the 6th Caçadores, under Christopher Chowne, was to storm the castle of Mirabete. The second, or centre column, comprising the 6th and 18th Portuguese infantry along with all the artillery, was to proceed along the main road and attack the works defending the pass. The third column, Kenneth Howard's brigade comprising the 50th, 71st, 92nd and a single company of the 5/60th, and commanded by Hill himself, was to climb the road leading through the pass of La Cueva and approach Almaraz via the path. The three columns set off at nightfall on 16 May, but at dawn all three were far from their objectives due to the rough nature of the terrain.

It was clear to Hill that there was little chance of being able to surprise the garrison at the bridge. Therefore, he sought another way to get his guns through the mountains. The French garrison was still unaware of Hill's force, and Hill thought he might succeed if he attacked Fort Napoleon and the bridge using only his infantry.

On the evening of 18 May Howard's brigade proceeded through the pass of La Cueva, reinforced by the Portuguese Caçadores. By dawn on 19 May, Hill's men had reached a point just half a mile from Fort Napoleon, but they were seen that morning as they crossed the mountains. The garrison inside Fort Napoleon, commanded by Colonel Aubert, was alerted, and the two centre boats of the bridge were removed.

The attack on the bridge at Almaraz began at dawn on 19 May, when Chowne's guns opened up against the castle at Mirabete. The defenders of Fort Napoleon, warned of the presence of Hill's troops, were prepared for the assault but were still taken by surprise when the 50th and part of the 71st burst from their cover and charged up towards the fort in the face of fire from the defenders and from the guns in Fort Ragusa. British troops were struck down as they dashed forward, but some reached the top of the hill and flung their ladders against the scarp. The men pulled themselves onto the first of the two steps and drew their ladders up. They placed the ladders on the step, climbed to the top of the ramparts, and were soon engaged in hand-to-hand fighting with the defenders along the ramparts.

First up was Captain Candler of the 50th, who leapt over the parapet and was struck by several French musket balls. His men followed him, and the defenders soon began to retreat to the bridge-head. The commander of the fort, Colonel Aubert, refused to run and put up a gallant fight. He refused the offer of surrender, and a sergeant of the 50th ran him through with his pike. French troops tried to get to safety inside the tower but were forced to surrender. The guns of Fort Ragusa were unable to fire for fear of hitting their own men fleeing to the river.

The defenders of the bridge-head joined in the retreat across the pontoon bridge. The guns inside Fort Ragusa fired briefly against Fort Napoleon until answered by the captured guns. The action had lasted just 40 minutes. Four grenadiers of the 92nd swam to Fort Ragusa and brought back some boats to repair the pontoon bridge. Soon the rest of Hill's force arrived to find the French abandoning all their works on both sides of the river. Hill had these works blown up and the bridge burned.

== Aftermath ==
The castle at Mirabete remained in French hands after Sir William Erskine, 2nd Baronet spread a rumour that Soult's entire force was approaching. This caused Hill, who had intended to level the castle, to retire to Trujillo and lose the chance to achieve complete success. The raid on the bridge at Almaraz cost the British 33 killed and 148 wounded, of which 28 of those killed and 110 of those wounded belonged to the 50th Regiment. French losses were estimated at 400, 259 of whom were prisoners.

In 1813, the Duke of Wellington sent Lieutenant Colonel Henry Sturgeon of the British Royal Staff Corps to repair the bridge. Sturgeon constructed a suspension bridge, similar to the one he built at Alcántara. The Spanish built the present bridge between 1841 and 1845.

== Notes ==
Preceded by Battle of Villagarcia	Napoleonic Wars; Battle of Almaraz	Succeeded by Battle of Maguilla
