= 7th Regiment of Horse =

7th Regiment of Horse or 7th Horse may refer to:

- 5th Dragoon Guards, ranked as 7th Horse from 1685 to 1690
- Carabiniers (6th Dragoon Guards), ranked as 7th Horse from 1694 to 1746
