= Battle of Maguilla =

1812 battle during the Peninsular War

- Part of the Peninsular War
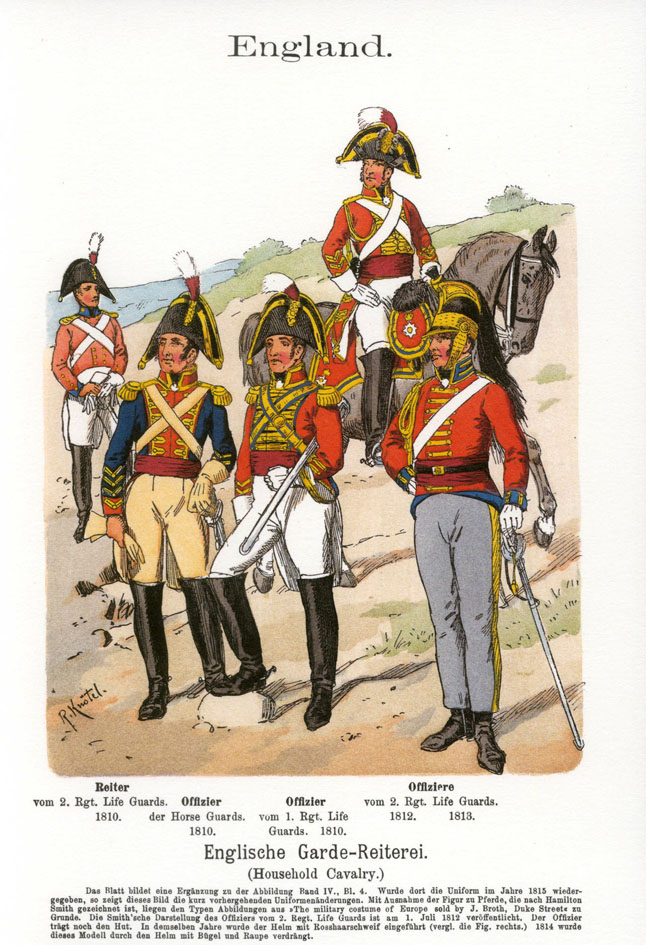
- British heavy dragoons wore a red coat and black bicorne hat at Maguilla, similar to the trooper at far left. The helmet was not adopted until 1813
Date	11 June 1812
Location	Maguilla, Spain 38°22′03″N 05°50′15″W
Result	French victory

Belligerents
(First French Empire) French Empire	(United Kingdom of Great Britain and Ireland) United Kingdom

Commanders and leaders
(First French Empire) François Antoine Lallemand	(United Kingdom of Great Britain and Ireland) John Slade

Strength
700	700

Casualties and losses
51 killed, wounded or captured	48 killed or wounded 118 captured

Peninsular War
Castile 1811–13
current battle

In the Battle of Maguilla (11 June 1812) a British cavalry brigade led by Major General John Slade attacked a similar-sized French cavalry brigade commanded by General of Brigade Charles Lallemand. The British dragoons scored an initial success, routing the French dragoons and capturing a number of them. The British troopers recklessly galloped after their foes, losing all order. At length, the French reserve squadron charged into the British, followed by the French main body which rallied. With the tables turned, the French dragoons chased the British until the horses of both sides were too exhausted for the battle to continue. The action took place during the Peninsular War, near Maguilla, Spain, a distance of 17 kilometres (11 mi) northeast of Llerena.

The clash occurred during an indecisive campaign in Extremadura between an Allied corps under Rowland Hill and a French corps led by Jean-Baptiste Drouet, Comte d'Erlon. In early June 1812, Hill began to advance against d'Erlon's weaker force. At Maguilla, Slade encountered Lallemand's brigade and was beaten. Nevertheless, Hill's advance continued until d'Erlon was reinforced. Hill then withdrew to a strong position that d'Erlon did not dare to attack. Finally, Hill advanced again but did not force a battle. On 22 July 1812 the decisive Allied victory at the Battle of Salamanca occurred farther north. This event finally forced the French to evacuate Andalusia and Extremadura.

== Background ==
On 6 April 1812, the Siege of Badajoz ended when the Anglo-Portuguese army under the Arthur Wellesley, Earl of Wellington stormed and captured the fortress. The 5,000-man French-Hessian garrison was all killed or captured, while the Allies suffered 4,100 casualties. The capture of Badajoz opened a major invasion route from Portugal into Spain. In 1812, Napoleon became preoccupied with his impending French invasion of Russia. The emperor handed control in Spain to his brother King Joseph Bonaparte and Marshal Jean-Baptiste Jourdan. In May 1812 there were 230,000 French troops in Spain, which Napoleon believed to be an adequate force. Yet half of the total was tied down east of Madrid. Marshal Jean de Dieu Soult's Army of the South had one corps involved in the Siege of Cádiz, a second corps under d'Erlon watching Badajoz, and the remainder occupying Andalusia. To the north, Marshal Auguste de Marmont's Army of Portugal had 52,000 men, but only 35,000 were available after subtracting garrisons. Joseph and Jourdan had 18,000 troops in a central reserve near Madrid.

In May 1812, Hill conducted a successful raid which resulted in the Battle of Almaraz and the destruction of a French bridge across the Tagus River. This limited French communication between Marmont and Soult to the bridge at Toledo. Meanwhile, British engineers led by Henry Sturgeon repaired the broken Alcántara Bridge; this permitted the Allies to transfer troops between the northern and southern sectors two weeks faster than the French were able to. Wellington took 48,000 troops to the northern sector to operate against Marmont, leaving 18,000 with Hill to face d'Erlon's corps. Hill had the British 2nd Infantry Division, John Hamilton's Portuguese Division, three Portuguese infantry regiments at Badajoz, and two British and one Portuguese cavalry brigades under Sir William Erskine, 2nd Baronet. Hill commanded about 7,500 British and 11,000 Portuguese. There were also 4,000 Spanish troops under Conde de Penne Villemur (cavalry) and Pablo Morillo (infantry).

D'Erlon led a corps of 12,000 French soldiers, including the infantry divisions of d'Erlon and Augustin Darricau and the cavalry brigades of Lallemand and André Thomas Perreimond. D'Erlon's own division was camped at Azuaga and Fuente Obejuna while Darricau's division was out of supporting distance to the north at Zalamea de la Serena. Wellington desired that d'Erlon's force be prevented from reinforcing Marmont. The British commander planned to have Hill and Spanish leader Francisco Ballesteros make alternate threats against Soult's army. If the French tried to press Hill, Ballesteros would move against Seville. If the French concentrated to crush Ballesteros, Hill would push forward. In the event, Ballesteros moved too quickly. The Spaniard decided to strike Nicolas François Conroux's 4,500 troops. On 1 June 1812 in the Second Battle of Bornos, Conroux's men were surprised but they rallied and drove off the 8,500 Spanish troops with 1,500 casualties and four guns. French losses were 400–600 men.

== Battle ==
When he heard the news of Bornos, Soult sent six infantry battalions and two cavalry regiments to help hunt down Ballesteros. This caused the Spanish general and his soldiers to take refuge under the guns of Gibraltar. Soult wished to smash Ballesteros or capture Tarifa, but when Hill began to advance, the French marshal had to drop his plans. On 7 June, Hill shifted his headquarters to Fuente del Maestre and on 9 June to Zafra. On 11 June, in a reconnaissance in force, Villemur's Spanish cavalry moved from Llerena toward Azuaga while Slade's brigade moved from Llera toward Maguilla. After several hours, Slade's brigade began to bump into French dragoon outposts, which were driven back. Soon afterward, the British dragoons encountered the main body of Lallemand's brigade arrayed in battle order.

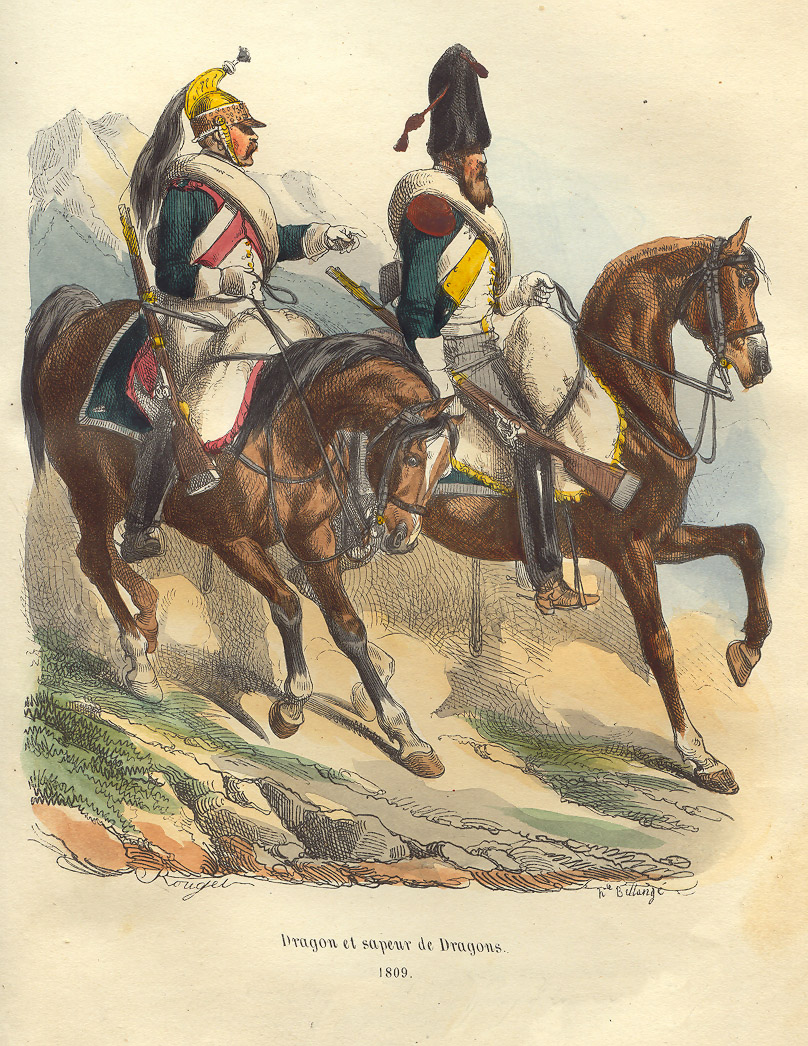
French dragoons

Lallemand's 700-strong brigade consisted of the 17th and 27th Dragoon Regiments. Slade commanded about 700 sabres from the 1st Royal Dragoon and 3rd Dragoon Guards Regiments. The British may have had a slight numerical advantage. Lallemand retreated to the outskirts of Maguilla where he determined to fight. Slade immediately ordered a charge, with the 1st Dragoons in the first line and the 3rd Dragoon Guards in the second. The French dragoons were completely broken and the British took about 100 prisoners. Instead of reforming his brigade, Slade plunged after the fleeing French, "each regiment vying with the other which should most distinguish itself", as he later proudly reported.

The reckless pursuit continued for several miles beyond Maguilla. Suddenly, there was a cry among the British dragoons, "Look to your right!" Lallemand had held a squadron in reserve, and now this small, but compact force crashed into the disorderly clump of British horsemen. Seeing this sudden turn of events, the main body of Lallemand's dragoons turned on their adversaries and forced them to retreat. It soon became a panicky flight of several miles, despite the appeals of Slade and his officers. The flight ended near Valencia de las Torres, a village about 4 miles (6 km) from Maguilla when both sides had exhausted their horses. Slade finally got his survivors into formation and withdrew beyond Llera.

The British lost 22 killed, 26 wounded, and 118 captured, with most of the captured being wounded. Lallemand reported losing 51 killed and wounded, including one officer killed and four wounded. Most of the French who were captured at the beginning of the action escaped. Despite his defeat, Slade reported, "Nothing could exceed the gallantry displayed by both officers and men on this occasion, in which Colonels Calcraft and Clinton, commanding the two regiments, distinguished themselves, as well as all the other officers present".

== Commentary ==
This was not the only occasion when Wellington's cavalry charged out of control. As examples, historian Charles Oman cited the 20th Light Dragoons at the Battle of Vimeiro, the 23rd Light Dragoons at the Battle of Talavera, and the 13th Light Dragoons at the Battle of Campo Maior. After the battle, a very irritated Wellington wrote to Hill:

I have never been more annoyed than by Slade's affair, and I entirely concur with you in the necessity of inquiring into it. It is occasioned entirely by the trick our officers of cavalry have acquired, of galloping at everything - and then galloping back as fast as they galloped on the enemy. They never consider their situation, never think of manoeuvring before an enemy - so little that one would think they cannot manoeuvre except on Wimbledon Common: and when they use their arm as it ought to be used, viz. offensively, they never keep nor provide for a reserve ... The Royals and 3rd Dragoon Guards were the best cavalry regiments in this country, and it annoys me particularly that the misfortune has happened to them. I do not wonder at the French boasting of it: it is the greatest blow they have struck.

== Aftermath ==
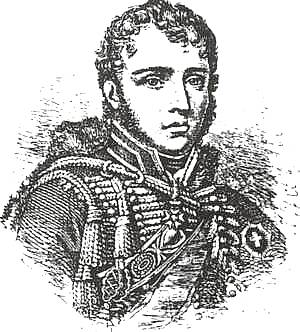
Charles Lallemand

The action at Maguilla had no effect on the campaign. D'Erlon retreated before Hill's advance, while sending a message to Soult that his 6,000 men were beset by 30,000 Allies. In fact, d'Erlon neglected to count Darricau's force, which was under his orders. He believed Hill's corps included the 7th Infantry Division, which was actually with Wellington in the north. Soult, who credited Hill with a more realistic 15,000 Anglo-Portuguese and 5,000 Spaniards, sent d'Erlon a 6,000-man infantry division under Pierre Barrois and a 2,200-strong cavalry division under Pierre Benoît Soult. Marshal Soult ordered d'Erlon to force Hill to fight a battle, or at least prevent him from sending reinforcements to Wellington. Barrois left Seville on 16 June and joined d'Erlon's force on 19 June at Bienvenida. With his own division and Darricau's, d'Erlon had about 18,000 troops.

When Hill heard about Barrois' reinforcement, he withdrew to the old battlefield of La Albuera. The 19,000 Anglo-Portuguese arrived there and entrenched themselves on 21 June. Hill expected to be attacked because the Allies had intercepted messages from King Joseph demanding that d'Erlon assault his foe. Actually, Soult routinely ignored instructions from Madrid and his lieutenant made excuses for not obeying Joseph's orders. From 21 June to 2 July the two opposing forces stood motionless, facing each other. The Anglo-Portuguese soldiers had to endure the stench of the hundreds of imperfectly buried corpses from the Battle of Albuera the previous year. On 1 July, Pierre Soult directed a cavalry reconnaissance of the Allied position, with Louis Ernest Joseph Sparre's brigade on the right, Gilbert Julian Vinot's brigade in the center and Lallemand's brigade on the left. Lallemand routed Villemur's cavalry from Santa Marta with substantial losses. The other two brigades skirmished with the Allied cavalry screen. D'Erlon reported to Soult that Hill had 25,000 infantry, 3,000 cavalry, and plenty of artillery; he believed it would be foolhardy to attack.

Hill broke the deadlock by advancing on 2 July. He expected a battle near Fuente del Maestre on 4 July, but the French withdrew when their left flank was threatened. On 7 July, d'Erlon abandoned a strong position at Valencia de las Torres when Hill again turned his left flank. At this point, d'Erlon was at Azuaga and both armies were in the same positions they were on 19 June, before Hill withdrew to La Albuera. The French commander sent Darricau to Zalamea with the cavalry of Vinot and Sparre. On 27 July, Vinot's cavalry raided Mérida from which they carried off food supplies. Curiously, both Hill and d'Erlon were satisfied that they had contained the enemy. Soult received news of Marmont's decisive defeat at the Battle of Salamanca on 12 August. The evacuation of Andalusia soon began. Hill found d'Erlon's lines empty on 26 August. Hill did not pursue because Wellington summoned him to join the main Allied army. D'Erlon joined Soult's main column at Córdoba on 30 August. Soon, the south of Spain was free from French occupation.

== Notes ==
Preceded by Battle of Almaraz	Napoleonic Wars; Battle of Maguilla	Succeeded by Battle of Mir (1812)
