= John Le Marchant (British Army officer, born 1766) =

British Army officer (1766–1812)

Major-General John Le Marchant
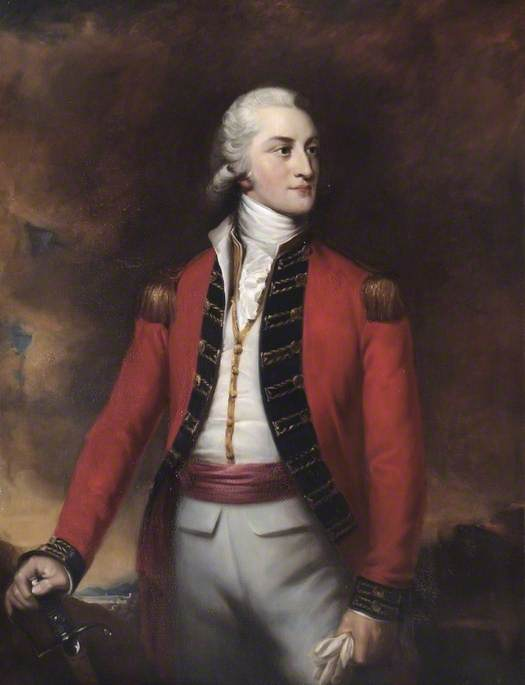
- Portrait by Henry James Haley
- Born: John Gaspard Le Marchant; 9 February 1766; Amiens, France
- Died: 22 July 1812 (aged 46); Salamanca, Spain
- Military career
- Allegiance: Great Britain; United Kingdom
- Branch: British Militia; British Army
- Service years: 1783–1812 (British Army)
- Rank: Major general
- Units: Wiltshire Militia; 1st Regiment of Foot; 6th Dragoons; 7th Light Dragoons
- Commands: 2nd Dragoon Guards
- Conflicts: French Revolutionary Wars; Flanders campaign; Napoleonic Wars; Peninsular War; Battle of Villagarcia; Battle of Salamanca †

Major-General John Gaspard Le Marchant (9 February 1766 – 22 July 1812) was a British Army officer who served in the French Revolutionary and Napoleonic Wars. He has been described as one of the finest British cavalry commanders of his generation, and was also an intellectual soldier who had a great influence on the efficient functioning of the British army. Le Marchant was instrumental in founding the first British military academy and staff college, and he saw active service in the French Revolutionary Wars and the Peninsular War, where he was killed in action at the Battle of Salamanca.

== Early life ==
John Le Marchant was born on 9 February 1766 in Amiens, France to a French mother and Guernsey father, who both came from old and prominent families. The Le Marchants were an extremely distinguished family in Guernsey, formerly part of the Duchy of Normandy, with many of his ancestors holding the positions of Bailiff or Lieutenant-Bailiff of Guernsey. His father, John Le Marchant, was a Cornet in the Royal Dragoons who attended Pembroke College, Oxford, and served with distinction under the Marquess of Granby during the last three campaigns of the Seven Years' War. His mother, Marie Catherine, was the eldest daughter of Count Hirzel de Saint-Gratien and a descendant of the celebrated French Protestant leader Admiral Gaspard de Coligny, from whom Le Marchant derived his middle name.

Le Marchant was born at his maternal grandfather's house in Amiens. He had a younger brother, James. After leaving Dr Morgan's school in Bath characterised as "one of the two greatest dunces that had ever been there" (the other being Sir Sidney Smith), Le Marchant reformed his character and was commissioned into a Wiltshire Militia regiment. In 1783, he transferred his service to the British Army and was commissioned into the 1st Regiment of Foot as the rank of ensign. A few years of duty in Ireland and Gibraltar followed and he then made his move into the cavalry, being commissioned into the 6th Dragoons. In the autumn of 1789 Le Marchant was promoted to lieutenant in the 2nd Dragoon Guards, and in 1791 he was promoted to captain and given the command of a regimental troop.

== Campaign experience and swordsmanship manual ==
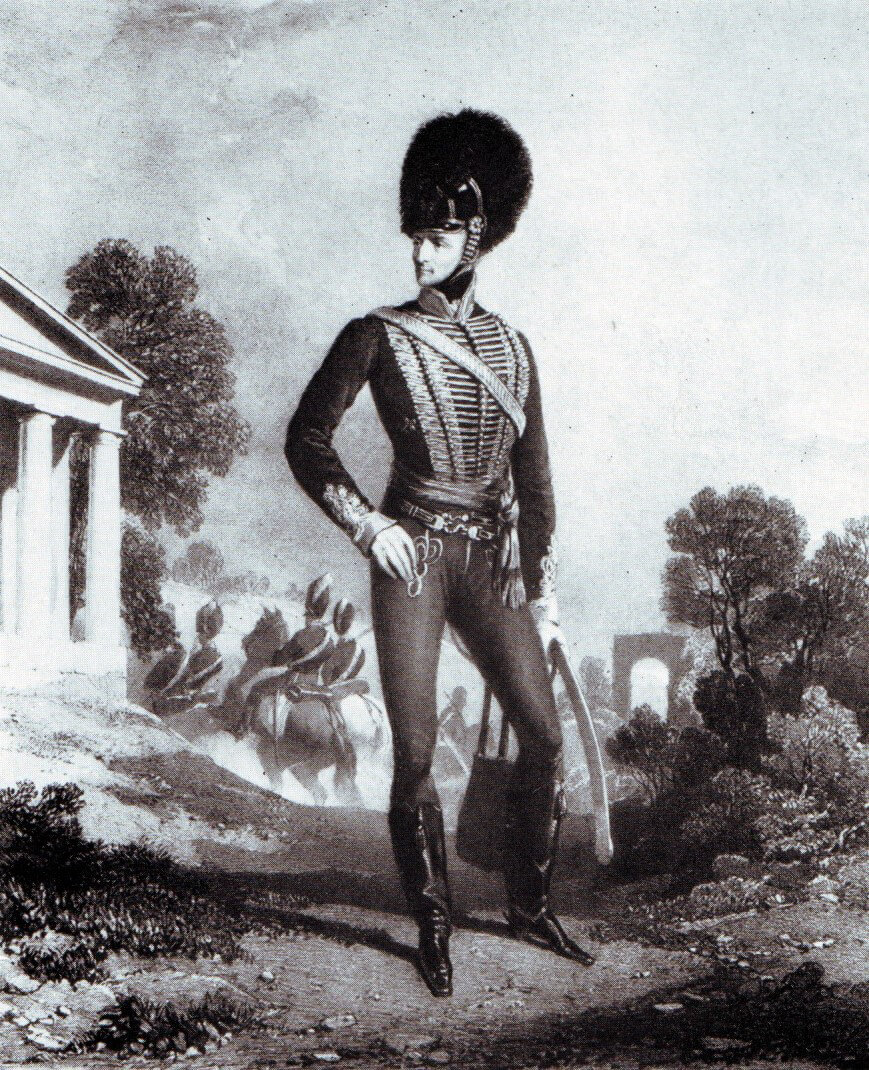
Portrait of Le Marchant in the 7th Light Dragoons

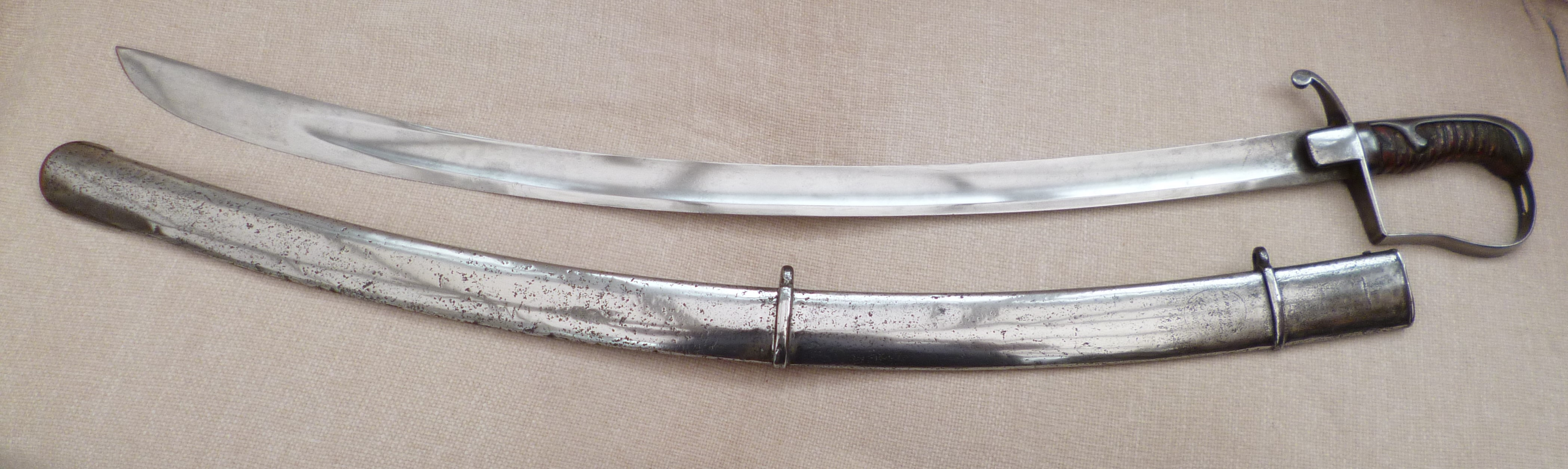
A Pattern 1796 light cavalry sabre, which was co-designed by Le Marchant

Le Marchant served as a brigade major during the disastrous Flanders campaign, and for a time held command of his regiment as the most senior officer present. His practical experience in the field brought to Le Marchant's attention the many deficiencies of equipment and training the British cavalry suffered from. He was impressed by the Austrian cavalry who were operating alongside the British, and was particularly struck by the disparaging remark of an Austrian officer who thought that the British cavalry's swordsmanship was "most entertaining" but reminded him of "someone chopping wood".

On his return to Britain he exerted himself to improve the equipment and combat training of the British cavalry. In 1795-6 he designed, in collaboration with the Birmingham sword cutler Henry Osborn, the Pattern 1796 light cavalry sabre, which was adopted for British light cavalry units. In 1796 his treatise of instruction in mounted swordsmanship was adopted by the army as part of its official regulations, The Rules and Regulations of the Sword Exercise of the Cavalry. The sword exercise became quite celebrated, and the elderly King George III became familiar with it, and country lanes abounded with small boys practising the cuts with sticks. Le Marchant toured Britain teaching cadres, drawn from both regular and yeomanry cavalry units, his system of swordsmanship; his methods were practical and painstaking and he was himself a superb mounted swordsman. Le Marchant was also to have gone to Ireland to teach his sword exercise there but was prevented from doing so, so his brother-in-law, Lieutenant Peter Carey of 16th Light Dragoons, undertook this duty in his stead. Le Marchant was promoted to lieutenant colonel in 1797. His promotion was at the direct behest of the King (Le Marchant lacked the family influence and wealth which was normally necessary for advances in rank), with whom Le Marchant had developed a friendly relationship. George III is reported as saying to Le Marchant "I dare say many persons will claim the merit of your promotion; now I wish you to know that whatever merit there is in it rests entirely between you and me, for no one else is concerned in it".(Le Marchant 1841, pp. 48–49).

After his promotion he served as second-in-command of the 7th Light Dragoons which Lord Paget commanded. Paget, as the Earl of Uxbridge, was later to command the Anglo-allied cavalry at the Battle of Waterloo. Though a good relationship existed between himself and Paget, Le Marchant found it difficult to keep company with the immensely wealthy and fashionable peer. He therefore transferred to his old regiment, the 2nd Dragoon Guards, becoming the regiment's commander.

== Founder of the first British military college ==
With the exception of the specialist instruction school for artillery and engineer officers at Woolwich, no institution for the education of military officers existed in Britain. In 1801, after overcoming considerable opposition on the grounds of cost, Le Marchant's scheme for establishing the High Wycombe and Great Marlow schools for the military instruction of officers was sanctioned by Parliament, and a grant of £30,000 was voted for the foundation of a Royal Military College, the two original departments being afterwards combined and removed to a purpose-built Royal Military College at Sandhurst. The military schools had two functions; first was in the instruction of serving officers in the functions of the efficient staff-officer, and second was the schooling of youngsters before they gained an officer's commission. Le Marchant was the first lieutenant-governor of the college, and during the nine years that he held this appointment he trained many officers who served with distinction under Wellington in the Peninsular War. It is notable that a number of senior serving officers, such as General Robert Ballard Long, attended courses at the college in order to improve their military knowledge. This college was one of the forerunners of the current Royal Military Academy Sandhurst, created in 1947. In 1804 Le Marchant received the personal thanks of King George III, who said "The country is greatly indebted to you".

== Peninsular War cavalry general ==
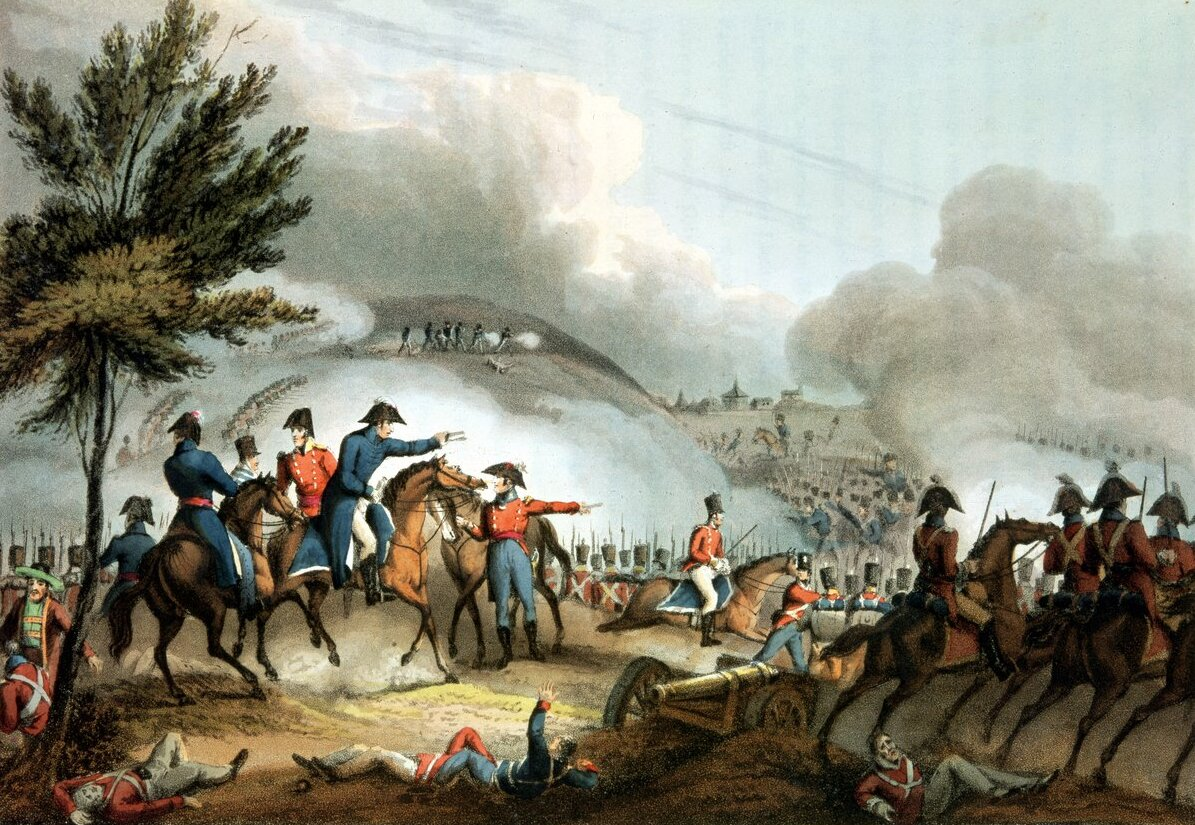
Le Marchant's brigade (right) charging at the Battle of Salamanca

Having been promoted to major-general Le Marchant was given the command of a brigade of heavy cavalry in 1811, and greatly distinguished himself in several actions. In the cavalry clash at Villagarcia, 11 April 1812, Le Marchant led the 5th Dragoon Guards in a perfectly timed flank charge, in echelon of squadrons, which defeated two strong columns of French cavalry under General Charles Lallemand. The French had been attacking British light cavalry under Sir Stapleton Cotton, who were being forced to give ground.

He gained his greatest success as a cavalry commander at the Battle of Salamanca on 22 July 1812, where he was killed. During the development of the Anglo-Portuguese attack on the over-extended French left wing Wellington is reported as saying to Le Marchant that he must take the first favourable opportunity to engage the enemy's infantry, "You must then charge at all hazards" was his final instruction. Following up the attack of the 5th Infantry Division Le Marchant led the 3rd and 4th Dragoons and the 5th Dragoon Guards in what was probably the most destructive charge made by a single brigade of cavalry in the whole Napoleonic period. The left wing of the French army were on the point of being defeated by the 3rd and 5th divisions of Anglo-Portuguese infantry when Le Marchant's dragoons charged in and destroyed battalion after battalion. Many of the French infantrymen sought the protection of the British infantry to escape the sabres of the dragoons. Le Marchant, knowing he had achieved a magnificent success, was leading a squadron against the last of the formed French infantry when he was shot through his spine and killed.

Wellington's despatch after the battle stated: "the cavalry under Lieutenant-General Sir Stapleton Cotton made a most gallant and successful charge against a body of the enemy's infantry, which they overthrew and cut to pieces. In this charge Major-General Le Marchant was killed at the head of his brigade, and I have to lament the loss of a most able officer".

== Legacy ==
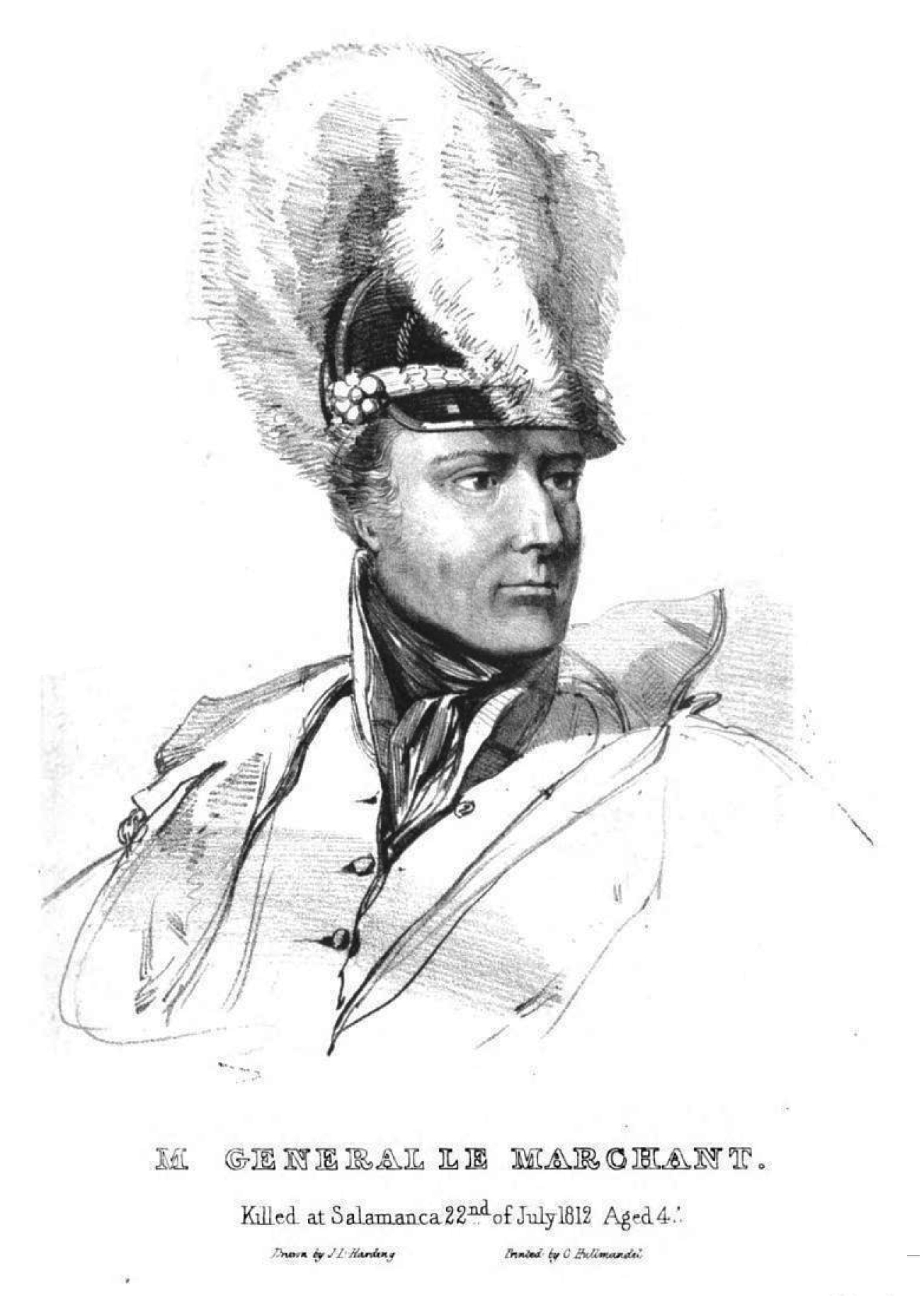
Posthumous portrait of Le Marchant

Le Marchant was responsible for a considerable improvement in the practical abilities of the British army on campaign. His sword exercise undoubtedly augmented the combat capabilities of the British cavalry. The military college produced many able staff officers, collectively known as "Wycombites," who went on to serve in important staff positions in the Peninsular War and the Waterloo Campaign. He also introduced the idea that officers should be formally trained in their duties rather than having to pick up the rudiments of their profession on active service.

Le Marchant was liked and admired by many in his profession, soldier and officer alike. The Duke of York, the commander-in-chief of the British Army, is said to have wept when he was told of Le Marchant's death.

He wrote several treatises on cavalry tactics and other military subjects, most published semi-anonymously (the ones adopted as army regulations were not officially ascribed to a single author). These included Rules and Regulations of the Sword Exercise and The Duties of Officers on the Outpost. His treatise An Outline of the General Staff of the Army was presented to the Duke of York in 1802. Its recommendations were not taken up in their entirety, but several of his suggestions were, such as the setting up of a "Staff Corps"; such a corps played an invaluable role in the functioning of the British Army during the Peninsular War.

John Le Marchant was buried on the field of battle. A monument to his memory was erected in St Paul's Cathedral, London in 1816 to the design of James Smith. Smith died during the process and the carving was completed by his assistants.

Fort Le Marchant on the north coast of Guernsey is named for him.

== Family ==
He married, on 29 October 1789, Mary daughter of John Carey of Guernsey. All accounts suggest that Le Marchant was a devoted husband and father. Mary Le Marchant pre-deceased her husband, dying in childbirth in 1811. Le Marchant had four sons and six daughters. His eldest son, Carey, who was prominent at the storming of San Sebastián, died of a wound at Saint-Jean-de-Luz during the latter part of the Peninsular War. Two of his other sons, Sir Denis Le Marchant, 1st Baronet, and John Le Marchant, gained public distinction. The children were left orphans at the death of their father and a yearly public pension of £1200 was awarded to them. The younger children were placed in the care of an aunt.

== See also ==
- Le Marchant Baronets
