= John Slade (British Army officer, born 1843) =

British general (1843–1913)

Major-General Sir John Slade KCB
- Born: John Ramsay Slade; 16 March 1843; Berwick St Leonard, Wiltshire, England
- Died: 4 September 1913 (aged 70); Salisbury, Wiltshire, England
- Military career
- Allegiance: United Kingdom
- Branch: British Army
- Service years: 1861 - 1905
- Rank: Major-General
- Commands: British Troops in Egypt
- Conflicts: Second Anglo-Afghan War; First Boer War; First Italo-Ethiopian War
- Awards: Knight Commander of the Order of the Bath

Major-General Sir John Ramsay Slade KCB (16 March 1843 – 4 September 1913) was a British Army officer who became General Officer Commanding the British Troops in Egypt.

== Early life and education ==
Slade was born at Berwick House in Berwick St Leonard, Wiltshire, into a distinguished military family, the eldest of four sons of Lieutenant-General Marcus Slade and his wife, Charlotte Ramsay. He was the grandson of General Sir John Slade, 1st Baronet and great-grandson of George Ramsay, 8th Earl of Dalhousie, and nephew of Admiral Sir Adolphus Slade.

He survived his three younger brothers. Arthur Maitland Slade (27 November 1846 – 1847) died in childhood, while Maj. Montagu Maule Slade (16 January 1849 – 29 February 1884) was killed in action in the Second Battle of Teb while serving with the 10th Hussars. His youngest brother, Lt.-Gen. Frederick George Slade CB FRGS (15 December 1851 – 16 August 1910) served in multiple campaigns in the late 19th century and was Inspector-General of the Royal Garrison Artillery headquarters 1902–1906.

He was educated at the Royal Military Academy, Woolwich.

== Military career ==
Slade was commissioned into the Royal Artillery in 1861. After taking part in the Bazaar Valley Expedition in 1878, he commanded a battery at the Battle of Maiwand in July 1880 during the Second Anglo-Afghan War. He served as a staff officer during the First Boer War and then became military attaché in Rome in 1887. He also served as a staff officer assisting General Antonio Baldissera during the First Italo-Ethiopian War before becoming General Officer Commanding the British Troops in Egypt in 1903.

== Personal life ==
Slade was twice married. In 1871, he married Lucía Amelia Aurora di Ramos (21 October 1872), daughter of Señor Don Vincente di Ramos in Marín, of Madrid. She died days after giving birth to their son, Victor Marcus (16 October 1872 – 21 January 1873), who died in infancy.

In 1882, he married secondly, Janet Little Wood, daughter of Maj.-Gen. Robert Blucher Wood and Lady Constantia Lowther. Lady Constantia was the daughter of Col Hon Henry Cecil Lowther (son of the 1st Earl of Lonsdale) and Lady Lucy Sherard (daughter of Philipp Sherard, 5th Earl of Harborough).

They had one daughter, Lucia Slade Marling CBE – named after his late first wife – who married Sir Charles Murray Marling.

Slade was baptised into the Church of England shortly after his birth and again at aged 2, but later converted to Roman Catholicism.

Military offices
Preceded by Sir Reginald Talbot	General Officer Commanding the British Troops in Egypt; 1903–1905	Succeeded by George Bullock
