= Marcus Slade =

Lieutenant-General Marcus Slade
- Born: Marcus John Slade; 22 January 1801; Salisbury, Wiltshire, England
- Died: 7 March 1872 (aged 71); Ryde, Isle of Wight, Hampshire
- Military career
- Allegiance: United Kingdom
- Branch: British Army
- Rank: Lieutenant-General
- Conflicts: 7th Xhosa War

Lieutenant-General Marcus John Slade (22 January 1801 – 7 March 1872) was a British Army officer who became Lieutenant Governor of Guernsey.

== Early life ==
Slade was the fourth son of General Sir John Slade, 1st Baronet (1762–1853) and the younger twin brother of Sir Frederic Slade, 2nd Baronet, who succeeded their father in the baronetcy. His youngest brother by his father's first wife was Admiral Sir Adolphus Slade.

== Military career ==
Slade was commissioned into the 75th Regiment of Foot in 1819. He was appointed Commanding Officer of the 90th Light Infantry and commanded that Regiment throughout the 7th Xhosa War in 1846 and 1847.

He was appointed Lieutenant Governor of Guernsey in 1859 and was also Colonel of the 50th (Queen's Own) Regiment of Foot from 1862 to his death in 1872.

He lived at Elvington House in Ryde on the Isle of Wight and is buried in the Old Cemetery at Ryde.

== Family ==
In 1842, he married Charlotte Ramsay, granddaughter of George Ramsay, 8th Earl of Dalhousie. They had two daughters and four sons:

- Sir John Ramsay Slade KCB (16 March 1843 – 4 September 1913)
- Arthur Maitland Slade (27 November 1846 – 1847) died in childhood
- Maj. Montagu Maule Slade (16 January 1849 – †29 February 1884), killed in action in the Second Battle of Teb while serving with the 10th Hussars.
- Lt.-Gen. Frederick George Slade CB FRGS (15 December 1851 – 16 August 1910), Inspector-General of the Royal Garrison Artillery headquarters 1902–1906.
- Fanny Maule Slade (1845 – 28 April 1875), married George Sackville Lane-Fox
- Helen Grace Slade (1854 – 7 April 1932), married Francis Robert Gregson

Government offices
Preceded by Sir George Harding	Lieutenant Governor of Guernsey; 1859–1864	Succeeded by Charles Rochfort Scott
