= 5th Dragoon Guards =

British Army cavalry regiment

5th Dragoon Guards (Princess Charlotte of Wales's)
- Badge of the 5th Dragoon Guards
- Active: 1685–1922
- Disbanded: 1922
- Country: England (1685–1697); Ireland (1698–1800); United Kingdom (1801–1922)
- Branch: Army
- Type: Cavalry of the Line
- Role: Heavy Cavalry
- Size: 1 battalion
- Nicknames: The Green Horse; The Green Dragoons; The Old Farmers
- Motto: Vestigia nulla restorsum (Latin – We do not retreat)
- March: (Quick) The Gay Cavalier (Slow) Soldier's chorus from Gounod's Faust
- Anniversaries: Salamanca Day
- Engagements: The Boyne 1690 Blenheim 1704 Ramillies 1706 Malplaquet 1709 Salamanca 1812 Balaclava 1854
- Battle honours: Blenheim, Ramillies, Oudenarde, Malplaquet, Beaumont, Salamanca, Vittoria, Toulouse, Peninsula, Balaklava, Sevastopol, Defence of Ladysmith, South Africa 1899–1902; France and Flanders 1914–18 (Note: Mons, Le Cateau, Retreat from Mons, Marne 1914, Aisne 1914, La Bassée 1914, Messines 1914, Armentières 1914, Ypres 1914 '15, Frezenberg, Bellewaarde, Somme 1916 '18, Flers-Courcelette, Arras 1917, Scarpe 1917, Cambrai 1917 '18, St. Quentin, Rosières, Amiens, Albert 1918, Hindenburg Line, St. Quentin Canal, Baurevoir, Pursuit to Mons)

Commanders
- Notable commanders: 1st Earl Cadogan; 7th Earl of Cardigan

The 5th (Princess Charlotte of Wales's) Dragoon Guards was a British army cavalry regiment, officially raised in January 1686 as Shrewsbury's Regiment of Horse or the Earl of Shrewsbury's Horse.

By 1687, it was known as Langsdale's Horse, from 1687 to 1688 as Hamilton's Horse, then from 1688 to 1691 as John Coy's Horse. In 1691, it was given a number and known as the 6th Horse. In 1697 the regiment was known as Arran's Horse and later became Cadogan's Horse.

As Coy's Horse, the regiment fought at the Battle of the Boyne. In 1804 it became the 5th (Princess Charlotte of Wales's) Regiment of Dragoon Guards.

In 1922, the regiment was amalgamated with the 6th (Inniskilling) Dragoons to form the 5th/6th Dragoons. Its history and traditions continue today in the Royal Dragoon Guards, an armoured cavalry unit of the British Army.

== History ==
c. 1751 painting of a regimental private

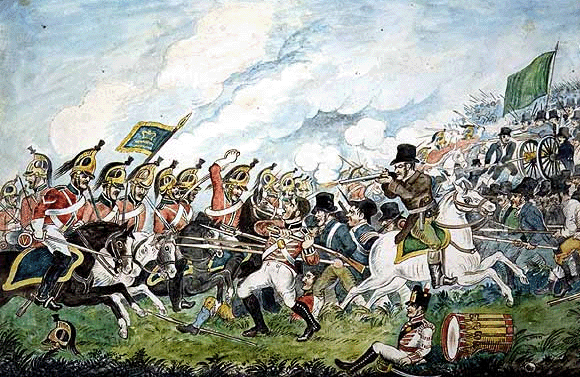
The regiment (left) at the Battle of Vinegar Hill

On 1 January 1686, several independent troops of horse raised in response to the 1685 Monmouth Rebellion were formed into the Earl of Shrewsbury's Regiment of Horse. It was first commanded by Lord Shrewsbury, with John Darcy, Lord Conyers, as his lieutenant-colonel.

After the Glorious Revolution of 1688, the regiment served in the Williamite War in Ireland, including fighting at the Battle of the Boyne and the First Siege of Limerick. When the Nine Years' War ended in 1697, the regiment escaped disbandment by being made part of the Irish military establishment, where it remained until the creation of the United Kingdom in 1801.

During the War of the Spanish Succession, the unit was commanded by William Cadogan, close aide to the Duke of Marlborough. It was engaged in many of Marlborough's battles and sieges, including Blenheim, Ramillies and Malplaquet; after the Peace of Utrecht in 1713, it resumed garrison duties in Ireland, where it spent most of the next 80 years.

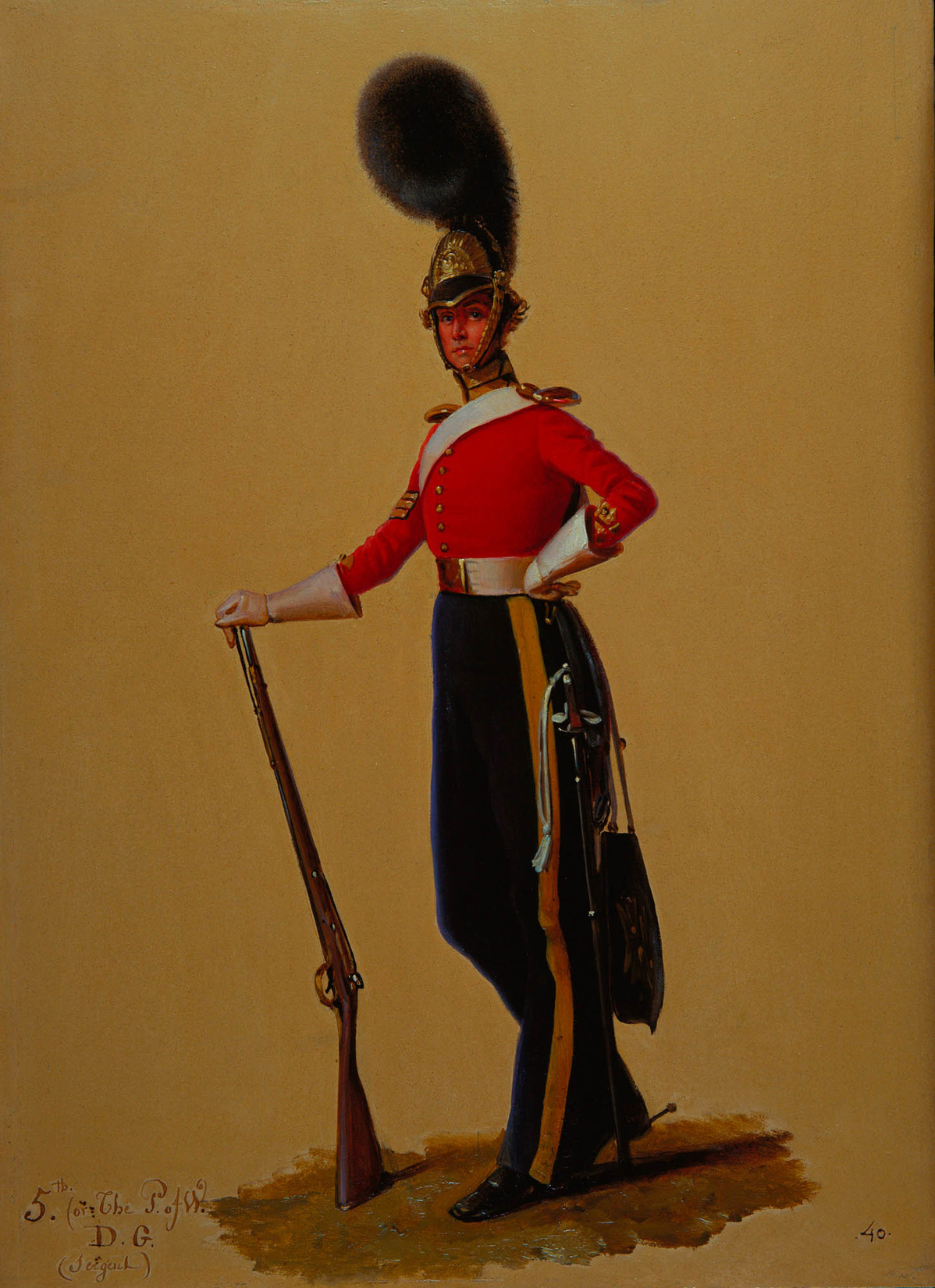
c. 1832 portrait of a regimental sergeant

Renamed Second Irish Horse in 1746, it then became 5th Regiment of Dragoon Guards in 1788. On the outbreak of the French Revolutionary Wars in 1793, it was posted to Flanders where it fought at the April 1794 Battle of Beaumont. The unit returned to Ireland and helped suppress the 1798 Irish Rebellion, including the battles of Arklow, Vinegar Hill and Ballinamuck. In 1804, it was retitled 5th (Princess Charlotte of Wales's) Regiment of Dragoon Guards after Princess Charlotte, later simplified to 5th (Princess Charlotte of Wales's) Dragoon Guards.

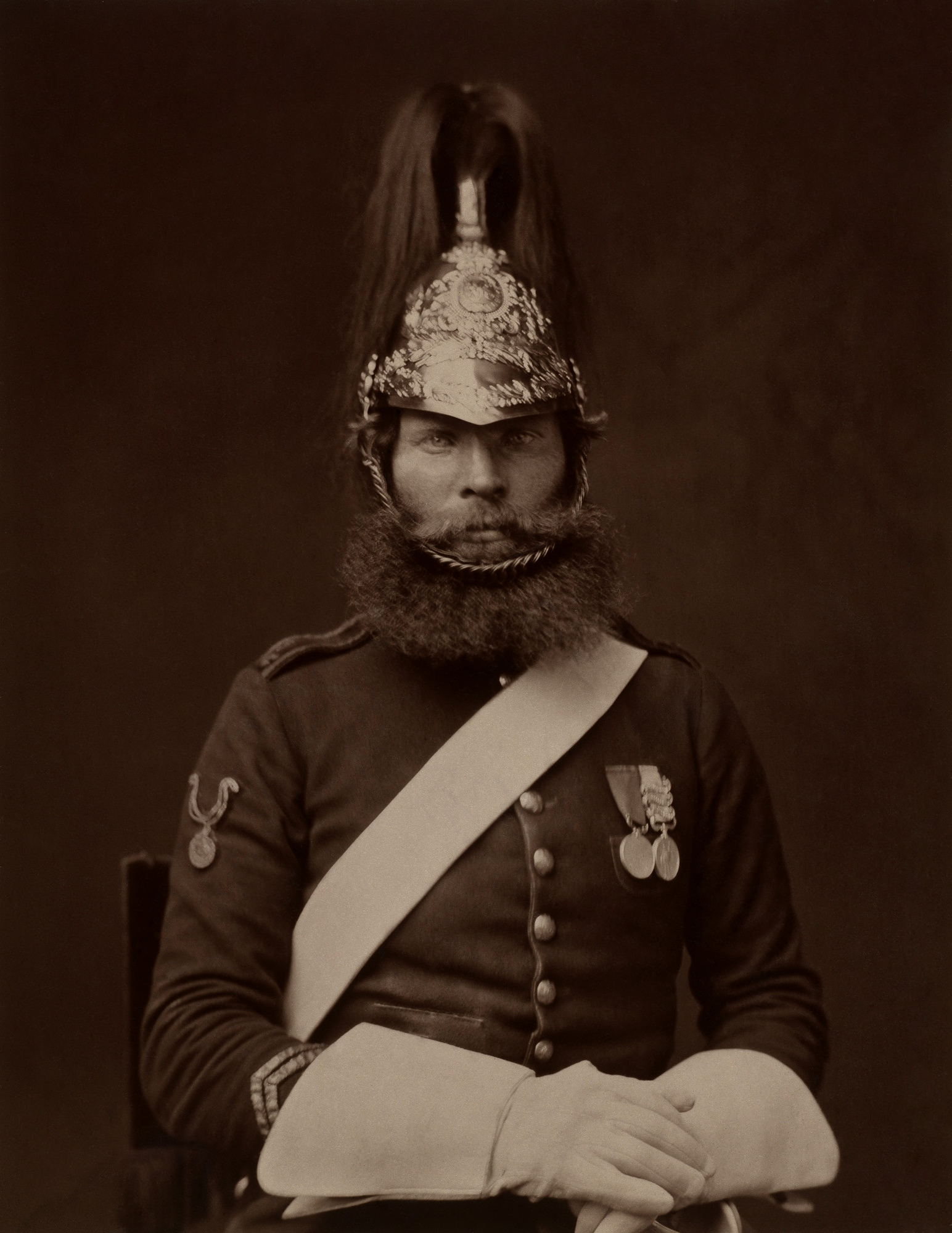
A regimental rough rider, c. 1856

Posted to Spain in 1810, it was part of John Le Marchant's brigade during the Peninsular campaign. The Battle of Salamanca in July 1812 is considered one of Wellington's greatest victories and Le Marchant's attack as the 'single most destructive charge made by a brigade of cavalry in the whole Napoleonic period.' The regiment celebrated 'Salamanca Day' until its dissolution in 1922; the tradition continues among several units of the modern British army.

Redesignated heavy cavalry, it was sent to the Crimean War in 1853 and fought in the October 1854 Battle of Balaclava. The Charge of the Heavy Brigade was a famous action but casualties were relatively light; the Brigade as a whole lost 92 dead and wounded in total, 15 of whom came from the 5th Dragoon Guards. A small detachment joined the 1885 Nile Expedition in 1885 but its next serious action was during the 1899–1902 Second Boer War, when it fought at the battles of Elandslaagte and Ladysmith.

During the First World War, it formed part of the British Expeditionary Force that landed in France in August 1914. Retitled 5th Dragoon Guards (Princess Charlotte of Wales's) in 1921, the following year it was amalgamated with the Inniskillings (6th Dragoons), to form 5th/6th Dragoons.

== Regimental museum ==
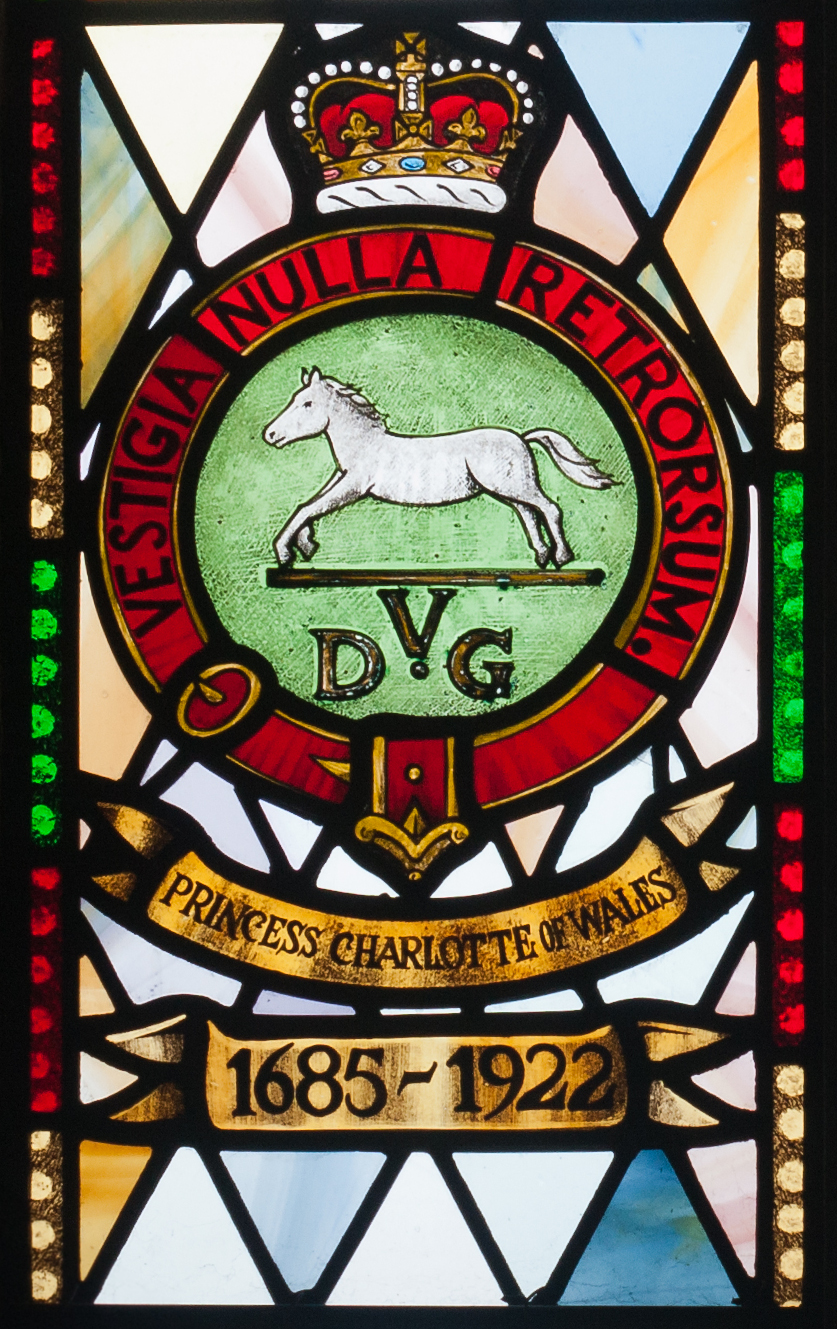
Memorial window at St Macartin's Cathedral, Enniskillen

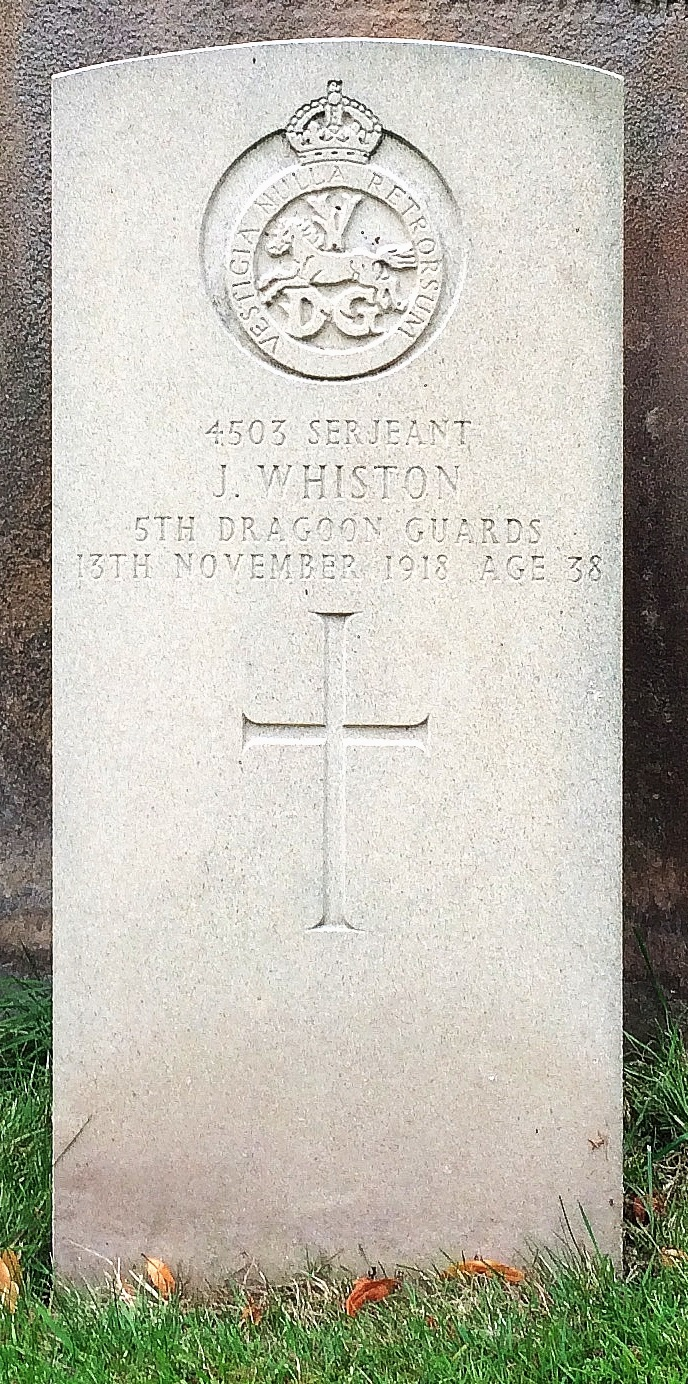
J Whiston, 5th Dragoon Guards; gravestone, St Mary's Church, Eccleston

The regimental collection is held in the Cheshire Military Museum at Chester Castle.

== List of Colonels ==
The colonels of the regiment were as follows:

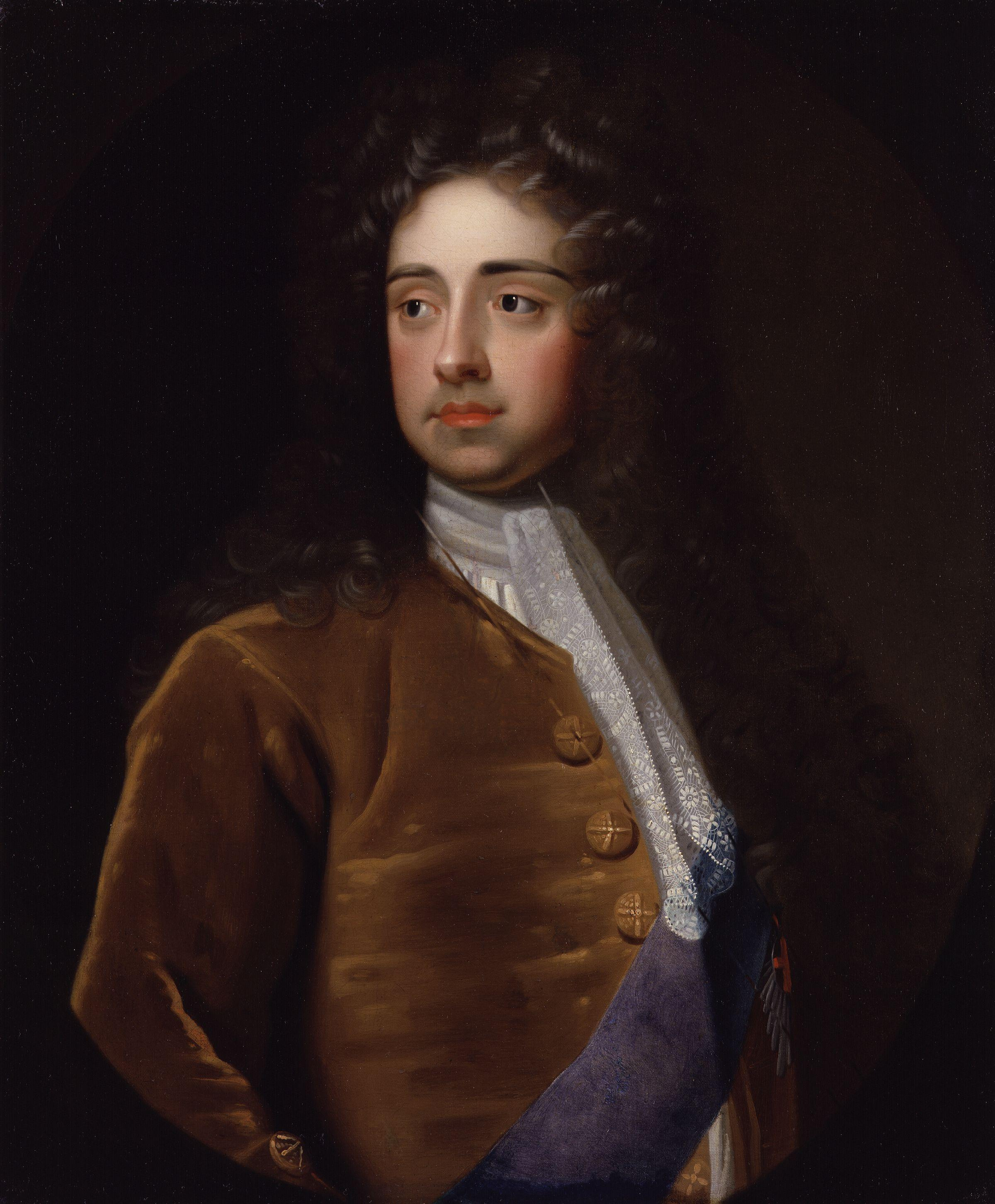
Earl of Shrewsbury
1686-1687

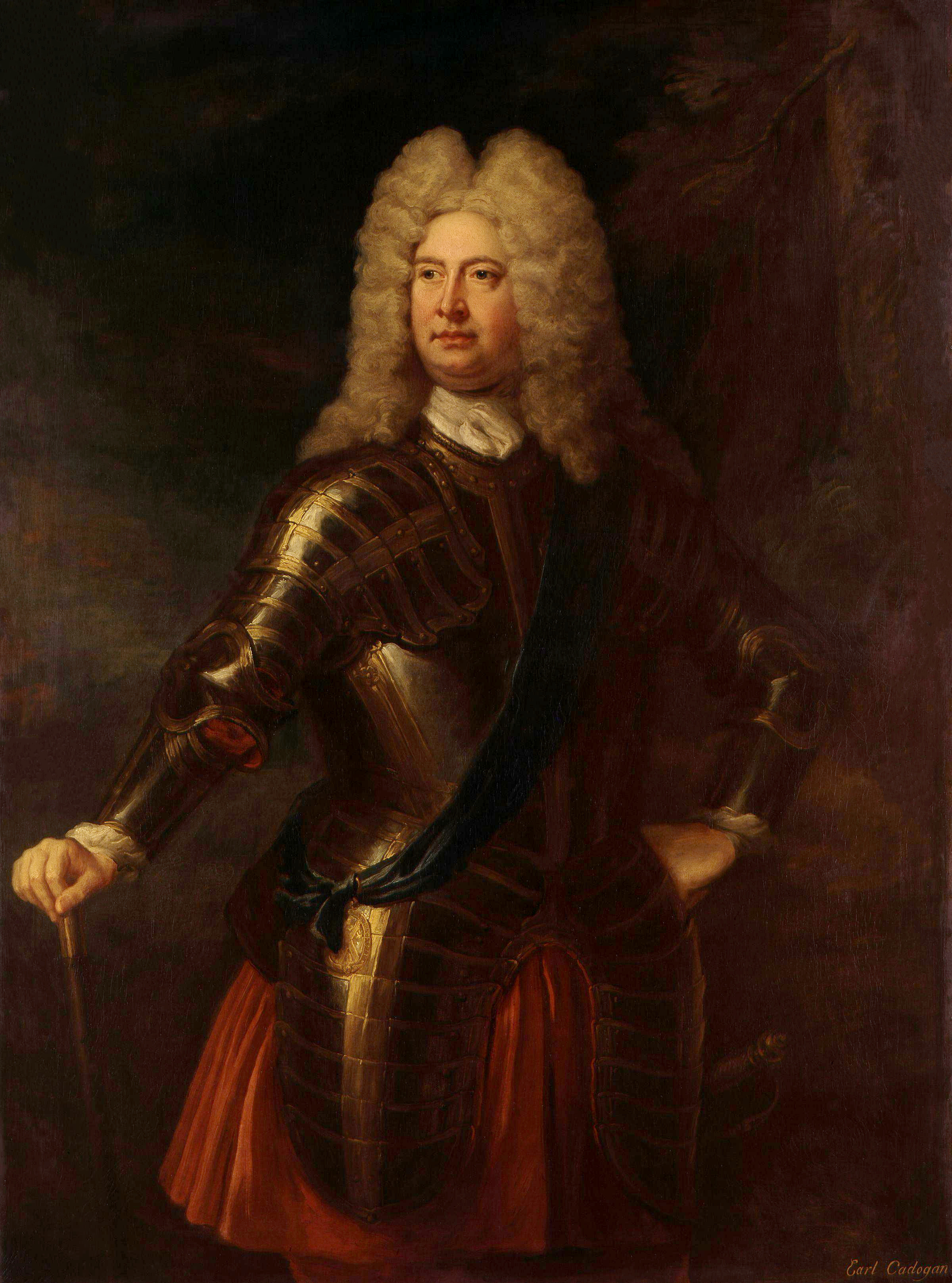
William Cadogan
1703-1712

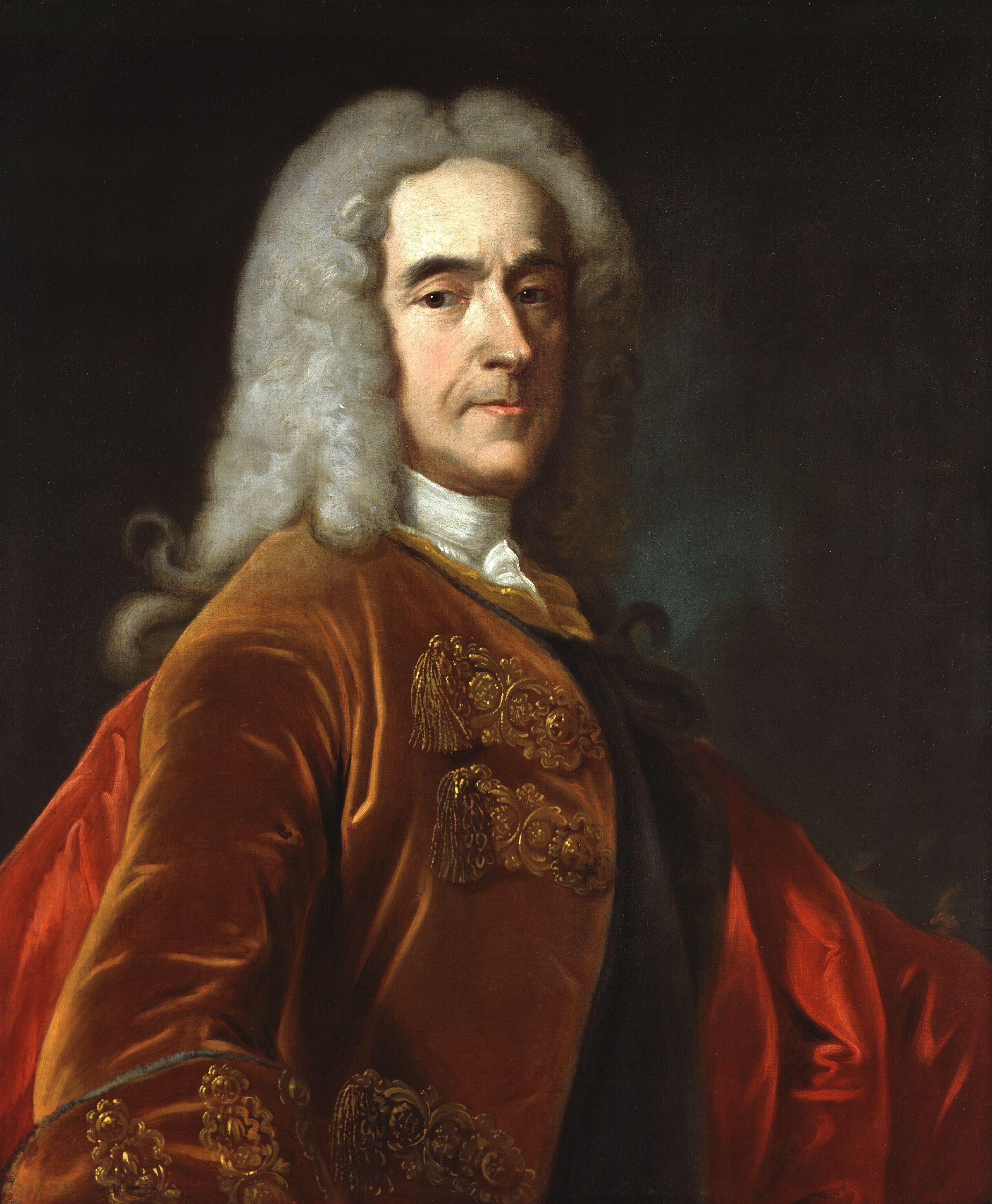
Viscount Cobham
1744-1745

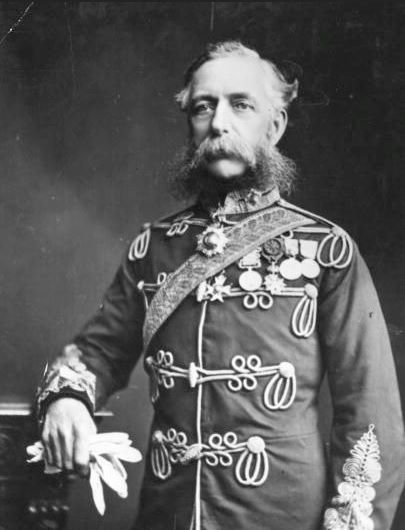
Earl of Cardigan
1859-1860

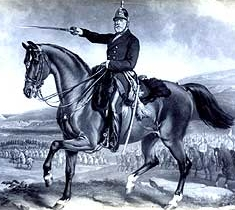
Sir James Scarlett
1860-1871

Sir Tom Bridges
1920-1922

=== 1686 Named after Colonel eg Shrewsbury's Horse ===
- 1686: Earl of Shrewsbury; resigned in 1687 and joined William III in the Dutch Republic;
- 1687: Marmaduke Langdale, 2nd Baron Langdale;
- 1687: Richard Hamilton; Irish Catholic, removed from command and jailed in the Tower of London 31 December 1688;
- 1688: John Coy; Lieutenant-Colonel of the regiment since 1686, experienced veteran with service in France and the Tangier Garrison;
- 1697: Charles Butler, 1st Earl of Arran;
- 1703: William Cadogan, later Earl Cadogan; Marlborough's quartermaster-general and head of intelligence, succeeded him as Master-General of the Ordnance in 1722.
- 1712: George Kellum; in service with the regiment since its formation in 1686;
- 1717: Robert Napier
- 1740: Clement Neville
- 1744: Field Marshall Viscount Cobham;
- 1745: Thomas Wentworth (died November 1747);

=== 1746 2nd Irish Horse ===
- 1747: Thomas Bligh
- 1758: John Waldegrave, 3rd Earl Waldegrave
- 1760: Hon. John Fitzwilliam

=== 1788 5th Regiment of Dragoon Guards ===
- 1789: John Douglas
- 1790: Thomas Bland; previously served 36 years with the 7th Dragoon Guards;

=== 1804 5th (the Princess Charlotte of Wales's) Regiment of Dragoon Guards ===
- 1816: Prince Léopold Georg Christian Friedrich of Saxe-Saalfeld-Coburg

=== 1823 5th (Princess Charlotte of Wales's) Dragoon Guards ===
- 1831: Gen. Sir John Slade; died aged 97 in 1859 and served in the Peninsular War, where contemporaries described him as 'that damned stupid fellow.'
- 1859: Lt-Gen. James Brudenell, 7th Earl of Cardigan; commanded the Light Brigade in the Crimean War;
- 1860: Gen. Hon. Sir James Scarlett; acted as CO of the regiment from 1840, led the Charge of the Heavy Brigade at Balaclava;
- 1871: Gen. Richard Parker;
- 1885: Gen. Sir Thomas Westropp McMahon
- 1892: Lt-Gen. Somerset Gough-Calthorpe, 7th Baron Calthorpe
- 1896: Col. Robert Baden-Powell
- 1912: Maj-Gen. Richard Temple Godman
- 1912: Maj-Gen. William Edward Marsland
- 1920: Lt-Gen. Sir George Tom Molesworth Bridges
- 1922: Regiment amalgamated with The Inniskillings (6th Dragoons) to form the 5th/6th Dragoons

== See also ==
- British cavalry during the First World War
- 5th (or Royal Irish) Regiment of Dragoons (1756–1799)

== Sources ==
- Cannon, Richard (1839). The Fifth, Princess Charlotte of Wales' Dragoons Guards. William Clowes & Sons.
- Child, John (1990). The British Army of William III, 1689–1702. Manchester University Press. ISBN 978-0719025525.
- Dalton, Charles (1904). English army lists and commission registers, 1661-1714 Volume VI. Eyre & Spottiswood.
- Fletcher, I. (1999). Galloping at Everything: The British Cavalry in the Peninsula and at Waterloo 1808–15. Spellmount, Staplehurst. ISBN 1-86227-016-3.
- Gore, St. John (1901). The Green Horse in Ladysmith. Sampson, Low, Marston and Co.
- Pomeroy, Ralph Legge (1924). The Story of a Regiment of Horse (5th Princess of Wales's Dragoon Guards) 1685–1922. Blackwood.
