= François Antoine Lallemand =

French general (1774–1839)

François Antoine "Charles" Lallemand
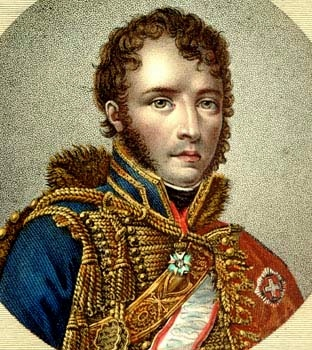
- Born: 23 June 1774; Metz, France
- Died: 9 March 1839 (aged 64); Paris, France
- Military career
- Allegiance: France
- Branch: French Army
- Service years: 1792 to 1815
- Rank: Brigadier General; Brevet Divisional General (1815)
- Conflicts: French Revolutionary Wars; Egyptian Campaign; Saint-Domingue expedition; Napoleonic Wars; Peninsular War; Battle of Villagarcia; Battle of Maguilla; Battle of Sehested; Battle of Waterloo

François Antoine "Charles" Lallemand (23 June 1774 – 9 March 1839) was a French general who served Napoleon I of France, tried to found a colony in what is now Texas, and finally returned to France to serve as governor of Corsica.

== Biography ==
=== Early years ===
Lallemand was born in Metz, France. He joined the cavalry in 1792 and during the French Revolution served in France, Egypt, Santo Domingo and Spain. In 1801 he was for three weeks a prisoner aboard HMS Cameleon after the French defeat in Egypt. Cameleon's captain was Commander Frederick Lewis Maitland, whom Lallemand would meet again in 1815 in connection with Napoleon's surrender. In 1804 Lallemand married a 16-year-old creole named Marie Charlotte Henriette Lartique (known as Caroline) in New York.

=== Military career ===
By 1811 he had earned promotion to General of Brigade, the title of Baron and commandant in the Legion of Honor. In 1812, while leading 17th and 29th regiments of dragoons in Spain, he was defeated by British cavalry under Stapleton Cotton at the Battle of Villagarcia, but later defeated a British heavy cavalry brigade under John Slade at the Battle of Maguilla.

After the retreat from Moscow he served on the staff of Marchal Davout Louis-Nicolas Davout with the XIII Corps in Hamburg. During the campaign of the fall of 1813 he served with the Danish troops supporting Napoleon in North Germany, commanding the 30th Light Cavalry Brigade consisting of two squadrons of the French 28th Chasseurs á Cheval Regiment and three squadrons 17th Lithuanian Uhlan Regiment. He then commanded a mixed French-Danish rearguard; Four squadrons Holstenske Rytter Regiment, 17th Lithuanian Uhlan Regiment, one battalion Slesvigske Jægerkorps and two battalions Holstenske Skarpskytte Regiment. He received the Grand Cross of the Order of Dannebrog.

When Napoleon was defeated and exiled the first time Lallemand joined the army of Louis XVIII. In 1815 he and his brother Henri tried to lead a rebellion against the Bourbon government but were arrested. When Napoleon returned from Elba to start the Hundred Days, he released them and gave them both commands in the Imperial Guard—Henri commanded the Foot Artillery Regiment and Charles the Chasseurs à Cheval—and the brevet rank of Général de Division. After the Battle of Waterloo, Lallemand accompanied Napoleon to Rochefort, where Napoleon surrendered. Lallemand tried to follow Napoleon into exile but the British refused to let him go and instead imprisoned him in Malta for two months before he escaped.

Lallemand and other Bonapartist officers were condemned to death in absentia. The Lallemand brothers were not included in the later amnesties.

=== America colonies ===
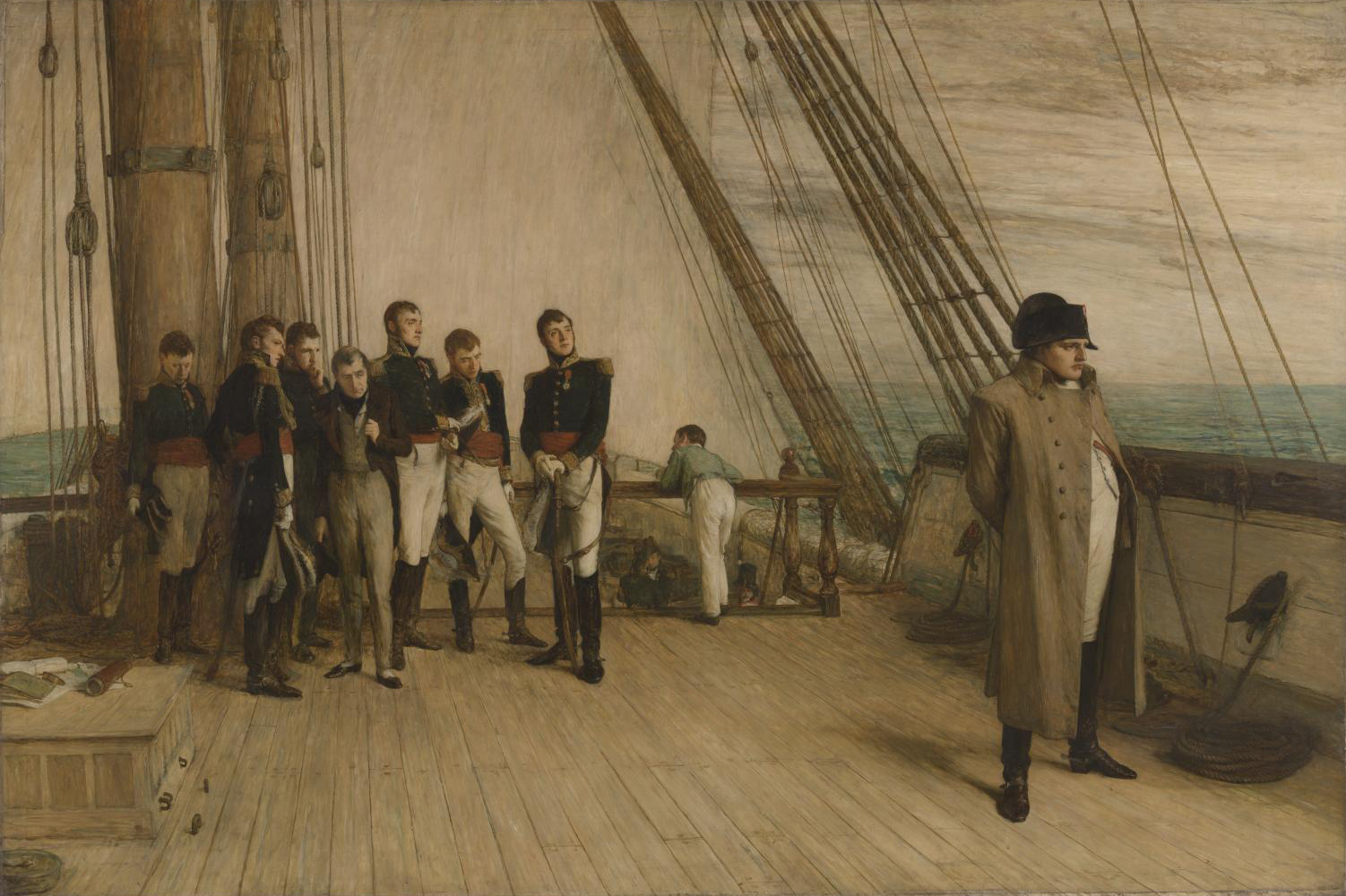
Napoleon on Board the Bellerophon, an 1880 painting by Sir William Quiller Orchardson. Lallemand is at the back, second from right.

Lallemand arrived in Boston in the ship Triton, from Liverpool, under the assumed name of Gen. Cotting. According to the New York Columbian of April 29, 1817, quoting from the Evening Post, he was smuggled on board the Triton at Liverpool. "On leaving the river, as the Custom House boat passed from ship to ship to examine the rolls, the General was passed in a boat to and from several ships, so as to evade the boarding officer." The next day, April 30, 1817, the Columbian reported: "two more of Bonaparte's late officers have arrived at Boston, from Leghorn--Dufresne Cyprion and Liell Memon." Lallemand, at Philadelphia, became a president of the French Emigrant Association, an organization that gained a grant of four townships in what is now Alabama for a Vine and Olive Colony. There were rumors that Lallemands would try to rescue Napoleon or put his brother Joseph on a throne in South America.

The Alabama land grants were sold to finance another colony in Texas. The planned Texas colony, Champ d'Asile ("Field of Asylum") was meant for defeated Napoleonic veterans. Lallemand stated in public that the colony would have military men only for protection; otherwise it would concentrate on agriculture.

On December 17, 1817 150 would-be-settlers sailed from Philadelphia for Galveston, Texas, where they arrived on January 14. Lallemand and his brother reached New Orleans, Louisiana on February 2, 1818, gathered new recruits and on March 10 left for Galveston with 120 volunteers. They sailed up the Trinity River to Atascosito where they built two small forts.

However, the Mexican governor Antonio Maria Martinez heard about the French, prepared an expedition to the Trinity River and stationed a force at San Marcos to guard against possible attacks. When the French heard about this move, they abandoned Champ d'Asile around July 24 and fled to Galveston. Lallemand abandoned the colony and returned to New Orleans. Jean Lafitte and Amable Humbert helped some of the survivors to return to Louisiana and the rest walked back to New Orleans in August 1818.

He acquired a sugar plantation in Louisiana and by 1820 owned fifteen slaves. He was reportedly involved in a plot to free Napoleon from Saint Helena. Lallemand later became a United States citizen. Napoleon left him 100,000 francs in his will and Lallemand used it to cover his debts.

=== Return to France ===
After Louis Philippe I restored the old imperial military grades after the July Revolution of 1830, Lallemand returned to France. From 1837-1838, he served as military governor of Corsica. Charles Lallemand died in Paris in 1839.

== In popular culture ==
- Historical novelist C.S. Forrester provides a fictional version of Lallemand's design to colonize Texas as the first step to liberate Napoleon from exile in St. Helena in the first episode of Admiral Hornblower in the West Indies.
- He is a minor character in Eric Flint's alternate history novel 1824: The Arkansas War. He serves as one of the leaders in an armed mob led by Robert Crittenden and is killed along with his brother in a battle at Arkansas Post.
- Phillipe, a main character in Honoré de Balzac's novel, The Black Sheep, is a participant in Lallemand's Champ d'Asile colonisation.

== Bibliography ==
- Fletcher, Ian. Galloping at Everything, Spellmount (Staplehurst, 1999). ISBN 1-86227-016-3
