= Sir John Slade, 1st Baronet =

British general (1762–1859)

General Sir John Slade Bt GCH
- Born: 31 December 1762; Maunsel House, Somerset, England
- Died: 13 August 1859 (aged 96); Norton Fitzwarren, Somerset, United Kingdom
- Military career
- Allegiance: United Kingdom
- Branch: Cavalry
- Service years: 1780–1859
- Rank: General
- Nickname: Black Jack Slade
- Conflicts: Peninsular War; Battle of Sahagún; Battle of Corunna; Battle of Bussaco; Lines of Torres Vedras; Battle of Sabugal; Battle of Fuentes de Oñoro; Battle of Maguilla
- Awards: Army Gold Medal, Royal Guelphic Order, 1835
- Other work: Baronet, 1831

General Sir John Slade, 1st Baronet, GCH (31 December 1762 – 13 August 1859) served as a general officer in the British Army during the Peninsular War. Slade was praised in official reports, including by Arthur Wellesley, 1st Duke of Wellington, who also voiced some criticisms of him privately. Slade received an Army Gold Medal, and was honoured three times with the thanks of Parliament. Slade's descendants include two admirals, namely son Sir Adolphus Slade and grandson Sir Edmond Slade. Despite achieving high rank during and after active soldiering, Slade was criticised as a general of cavalry by some contemporaries and historians.

== Background and early military life ==
Slade was the son of John Slade (d. 1801) of Maunsel House, Somerset, a Victualling Commissioner, and his wife, Charlotte née Portal. He obtained a commission as cornet in the 10th Dragoons on 11 May 1780, and became a lieutenant on 28 April 1783, captain on 24 October 1787, major on 1 March 1794, and lieutenant colonel on 29 April 1795. On 18 October 1798, he exchanged to the 1st Dragoons (the Royals). He was appointed equerry to the Prince Ernest Augustus, Duke of Cumberland in 1800, and became a colonel in the army on 29 April 1802. In June 1804, he was made brigadier, and gave up command of the Royals.

He is said to "have danced with Marie Antoinette who gave him a snuff box".

== Peninsular War cavalry general ==
In October 1808, Slade was sent to Corunna in command of a hussar brigade. He led the 10th Hussars in the successful cavalry action at Sahagún on 20 December. The 10th arrived too late to play an active role in the action, primarily because Slade insisted on making a stirring, and apparently over-long, speech ending in the words: "... blood and slaughter, march!" Slade made an enemy of Henry, Lord Paget, who commanded all the cavalry in the Corunna campaign. Paget made no pretence of hiding his low opinion of Slade, once calling him "... that damned stupid fellow", in a voice that many nearby officers and troopers heard. Slade shared in the arduous work of the cavalry during John Moore's retreat, and served as a volunteer at the Battle of Corunna, when the cavalry had embarked.

He was employed on the staff in England for six months, but returned to the Peninsula in August 1809 with a brigade of dragoons, and served there for four years. He participated in the battles of Busaco and Fuentes de Oñoro. He commanded the cavalry division, in Stapleton Cotton's absence, during André Masséna's retreat from Portugal in the spring of 1811. Wellington mentioned him favourably in his dispatch of 14 March.

On 11 June 1812, when he was under Rowland Hill in Estremadura, Slade was beaten by Charles Lallemand in a cavalry action at Maguilla. Each side deployed 700 dragoons in two regiments. The British had the advantage in the first encounter, and followed headlong in pursuit through a defile, beyond which they found the French reserve drawn up. Their own reserve had joined in the pursuit and lost its formation. The brigade panicked, was pursued by the French for several miles, and lost more than 100 prisoners.

Slade rode with the leading squadrons, instead of attending to the supports, and Wellington and others blamed him. Wellington was furious, writing privately: "I have never been more annoyed than by Slade's affair. Our officers of cavalry have acquired a trick of galloping at every thing. They never consider the situation, never think of manoeuvring before an enemy, and never keep back or provide for a reserve." Such criticism from his commander-in-chief was echoed by some of his subordinates; one cavalry officer wrote: "As a leader of cavalry he was deplorable. He was a byword for inefficiency throughout the army." Another officer wrote, commenting specifically on the Battle of Sabugal: “[General Slade] … let no possible opportunity for inaction to pass him - pretending not to comprehend orders, which the events passing before him would have made comprehensible to a trumpeter, … a curse to the cause, and a disgrace to the service.” Sir Charles Oman expressed the view that he was capable only of following definite orders and lacked initiative.

It has been claimed that Slade eroded the morale of his brigade between 1811 and 1812, with this being partly the cause of the reverse at Maguilla. That Slade, accused of ineptitude by contemporaries, remained in command of a brigade until mid-1813 has been attributed by commentators to Wellington's widely perceived inability to rid himself of undesirable senior officers, except by employing various subterfuges.

== Later career and honours ==
In May 1813, Slade's brigade was transferred to Henry Fane, and he went home, and was employed for a year in Ireland. The official reason for Slade losing his command was that he was senior to Major General Henry Clinton, who had been given the local rank of lieutenant general. Slade received an Army Gold Medal and one clasp for Corunna and Fuentes d'Oñoro. He had been promoted to major general on 25 October 1809, became a lieutenant general on 4 June 1814, and a general on 10 January 1837. In 1831, he was given the colonelcy of the 5th Dragoon Guards; on 30 September 1831 he was made a baronet, and in 1835 he was appointed a GCH. He was honoured three times with the thanks of Parliament. He died on 13 August 1859 at his home, Montys Court, and was buried at Norton Fitzwarren, near Taunton, Somerset, having been 'the oldest living member of the army save one'.

== Family ==
Sir John married firstly, on 20 September 1792, Anna Eliza Dawson (died 24 December 1819), daughter of James Dawson of Forkhill, County Armagh. They had seven sons (six of whom joined the military) and two daughters:

- Charlotte Susan Slade (20 July 1795 – 17 November 1878), married Henri Milliet de Faverges et de Challes
- Lt. Col. John Henry Slade (8 July 1796 – 30 October 1843)
- Anna Eliza Slade (6 December 1797 – 7 May 1872), married Wadham Penruddock Wyndham
- Maj. Charles George Slade (30 September 1799 – 10 February 1839)
- Frederick William Slade, 2nd Baronet QC (22 January 1801 – 8 August 1863), twin with Marcus
- Lt. Gen. Marcus John Slade (22 January 1801 – 7 March 1872), twin with Frederick
- Admiral Sir Adolphus Slade KCB (22 May 1802 – 13 November 1877) died unmarried.
- Ernest Augustus Slade (30 June 1805 – 5 March 1868), served in the 40th and 54th Foot in Burma
- Lt. Alfred Robert Slade (7 October 1806 – 20 December 1829), died at sea

Secondly, Sir John married Matilda Ellen Dawson, his late wife's sister, on 17 June 1822, (d. 12 September 1868). He had four more sons and two more daughters:

- Maj.-Gen. Herbert Dawson Slade (27 May 1824 – 15 June 1900)
- Wyndham Dawson Slade JP DL (30 August 1826 – 13 March 1910), married Cicely Neave daughter of Sir Digby Neave, 3rd Baronet
- Lt.-Col. William Hicks Slade (9 December 1829 – 28 July 1884), married Cecilia Louisa des Voeux, daughter of Sir Charles des Voeux
- Rev. George FitzClarence Slade (13 September 1831 – 23 December 1804), a Fellow of All Souls College, Oxford, father of Admiral Sir Edmond Slade KCIE KCVO (1859–1928) and grandfather of Madelene Slade and Martin Beale
- Sophia Louisa Slade (14 August 1837 – 1920), married Lt Col Adolphus William Desart Burton
- Gertrude Matilda Slade (18 April 1841 – 8 May 1919), died unmarried

He was succeeded in the baronetcy by his eldest surviving son, Sir Frederic Slade, 2nd Baronet (1801–1863), queen's counsel and bencher of the Middle Temple.

== In culture ==
The National Portrait Gallery posits that one of Robert Dighton junior's military etchings in its Reference Collection was "probably" of Slade. Slade also features as a general in Allan Mallinson's earlier novels in the Matthew Hervey series.

== Bibliography ==
- Burnham, R. and McGuigan, R. (2017) Wellington's Brigade Commanders: Peninsula and Waterloo, Pen & Sword Military, Barnsley Yorkshire.
- Cassels, S.A.C. (Ed.), Peninsular Portrait 1811-1814 - The Letters of William Bragge, Third (King's Own) Dragoons, London. (1963).
- Fletcher, I., Galloping at Everything: The British Cavalry in the Peninsula and at Waterloo 1808-15, Spellmount, Staplehurst (1999). ISBN 1-86227-016-3.
- Hibbert, C. Corunna, (Batsford, 1961) ISBN 0-900075-84-8.
- Liddel, R.S., The Memoirs of the Tenth Royal Hussars (Prince of Wales' Own), London (1891).
- Oman, Charles. Wellington's Army, 1809-1814. London: Greenhill, (1913) 1993. ISBN 0-947898-41-7
- Smith, Digby. The Napoleonic Wars Data Book. London: Greenhill, 1998. ISBN 1-85367-276-9
- Supplementary Despatches, Correspondence and Memoranda of Field Marshal the Duke of Wellington, 2nd Duke of Wellington (ed.), London 1860.
- Teffeteller, G.L. (1989) Wellington and Sir Rowland Hill, The International History Review, Vol. 11, No. 1 (Feb., 1989), pp. 68–75, Taylor & Francis.
- Weller, J. (1962 - reprinted 1992) Wellington in the Peninsula, Greenhill Books, London. ISBN 1-85367-381-1

Attribution

- This article incorporates text from a publication now in the public domain: "Slade, John". Dictionary of National Biography. London: Smith, Elder & Co. 1885–1900.

Military offices
Preceded by Prince Leopold of Saxe-Coburg-Saalfeld	Colonel of the 5th Dragoon Guards; 1831–1859	Succeeded by The Earl of Cardigan
Baronetage of the United Kingdom
New creation	Baronet (of Maunsell Grange); 1831–1859	Succeeded by Frederic Slade
