= Battle of Vimeiro order of battle =

This is an order of battle for the Battle of Vimeiro that was fought on 20 August 1808.

== Abbreviations used ==
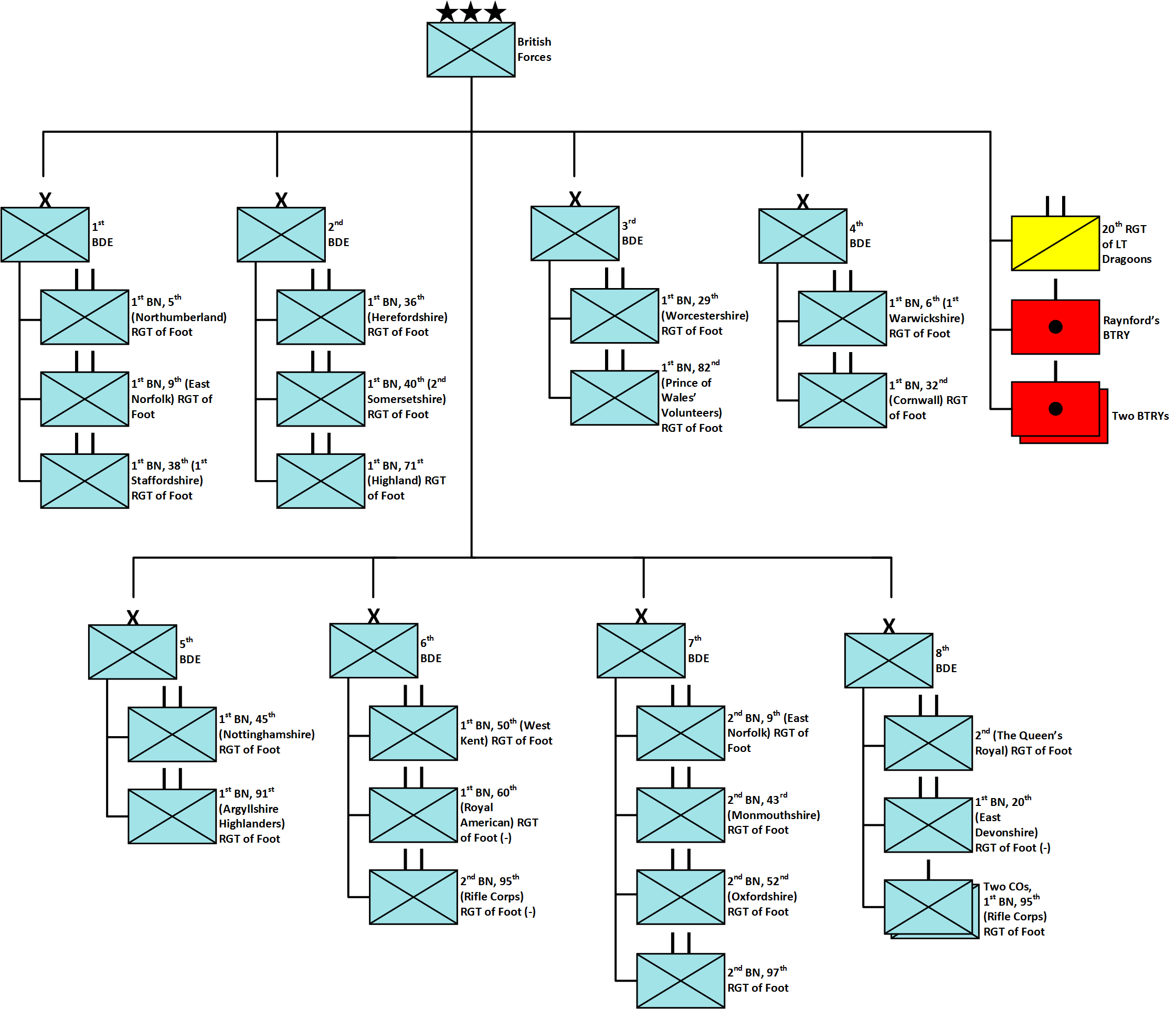
British forces at the Battle of Vimiero during the Peninsula War

=== Military rank ===
- Gen = General
- Lt Gen = Lieutenant-General
- Maj Gen = Major-General
- GD = général de division
- Brig Gen = Brigadier-General
- GB = général de brigade
- Col = Colonel
- Lt Col = Lieutenant Colonel
- Maj = Major
- Capt = Captain
- Lt = Lieutenant

=== Other ===
- (w) = wounded
- (mw) = mortally wounded
- (k) = killed in action
- (c) = captured

== British-Portuguese Army ==
Commander-in-chief: Lt Gen Sir Arthur Wellesley

| Brigade | Regiments and Others |
|---|---|
| 1st Brigade Maj Gen Rowland Hill (2,658 total) | 1st Battalion, 5th Regiment of Foot (944); 1st Battalion, 9th Regiment of Foot (761); 1st Battalion, 38th Regiment of Foot (953) |
| 2nd Brigade Maj Gen Ronald Craufurd Ferguson (2,449 total) | 36th Regiment of Foot (591); 1st Battalion, 40th Regiment of Foot (923); 1st Battalion, 71st Regiment of Foot (935) |
| 3rd Brigade Brig Gen Miles Nightingall (1,520 total) | 29th Regiment of Foot (616); 1st Battalion, 82nd Regiment of Foot (904) |
| 4th Brigade Brig Gen Barnard Foord Bowes (1,813 total) | 1st Battalion, 6th Regiment of Foot (943); 1st Battalion, 32nd Regiment of Foot (870) |
| 5th Brigade Brig Gen Catlin Craufurd (1,832 total) | 1st Battalion, 45th Regiment of Foot (915); 91st Regiment of Foot (917) |
| 6th Brigade Brig Gen Henry Fane (2,005 total) | 1st Battalion, 50th Regiment of Foot (945); 5th Battalion, 60th Regiment of Foot (Rifles) (604); 2nd Battalion, 95th Rifles(4 companies) (456) |
| 7th Brigade Brig Gen Robert Anstruther (2,703 total) | 2nd Battalion, 9th Regiment of Foot (633); 2nd Battalion, 43rd Light Infantry (721); 2nd Battalion, 52nd Light Infantry (654); 2nd Battalion, 97th Regiment of Foot (695) |
| 8th Brigade Brig Gen Wroth Palmer Acland (1,332 total) | 2nd Regiment of Foot (731); 20th Regiment of Foot (7 ½ companies) (401); 1st Battalion, 95th Rifles (2 companies) (200) |
| Cavalry Lt Col Charles Douglas Taylor (240 total) | 20th Light Dragoons (240) |
| Artillery Lt Col William Robe (226 total) | Two and a half companies (226 men, 16 guns); Lawson's Company |
| Portuguese detachment Lt Col Nicholas Trant (2,585 total) | 6th Cavalry Regiment (104); 11th Cavalry Regiment (50); 12th Cavalry Regiment (104); Lisbon Police Cavalry (41); 4th Artillery Regiment (210); 12th Infantry Regiment (605); 21st Infantry Regiment (605); 24th Infantry Regiment (304); Porto Caçadores (562) |
Total British and Portuguese force: 19,363 men (16,778 British, 2,585 Portuguese, 16 guns)

== French Army of Portugal ==
Commander-in-chief: General of Division Jean-Andoche Junot, duke of Abrantes

| Division | Brigade | Regiments and Others |
|---|---|---|
| Division Delaborde GD Henri François Delaborde (6,722 total) | 1st Brigade GB Antoine François Brenier de Montmorand (4,531 total) | 3rd Battalion, 2nd Light Infantry Regiment (1,075); 3rd Battalion, 4th Light Infantry Regiment (1,098); 1st and 2nd battalions, 70th Line Infantry Regiment (2,358) |
| Division Delaborde GD Henri François Delaborde (6,722 total) | 2nd Brigade GB Jean Guillaume Barthélemy Thomières (2,191 total) | 1st and 2nd battalions, 86th Line Infantry Regiment (1,945); 4th Swiss Infantry Regiment (2 companies) (246) |
| Division Loison GD Louis Henri Loison (5,983 total) | 1st Brigade GB Jean-Baptiste Solignac (3,986 total) | 3rd Battalion, 12th Light Infantry Regiment (1,253); 3rd Battalion, 15th Light Infantry Regiment (1,305); 3rd Battalion, 58th Line Infantry Regiment (1,428) |
| Division Loison GD Louis Henri Loison (5,983 total) | 2nd Brigade GB Hugues Charlot (1,997 total) | 3rd Battalion, 32nd Line Infantry Regiment (1,034); 3rd Battalion, 82nd Line Infantry Regiment (963) |
| Cavalry Division GB Pierre Margaron (2,251 total) | | 1st Provisional (ex-26th) Chasseur à Cheval Regiment (263); 3rd Provisional Dragoon Regiment (640); 4th Provisional Dragoon Regiment (589); 5th Provisional Dragoon Regiment (659); Squadron of Volunteer Cavalry (100) |
| Reserve GD François Étienne de Kellermann | | 1st and 2nd Battalion, 1st Regiment Reserve Grenadiers (1,050); 1st and 2nd Battalion, 2nd Regiment Reserve Grenadiers (1,050) |
| Auxiliaries (700 total, 23 guns) | | Artillery, engineers and train (700); Four batteries (23 guns) |
Total French force: 15,656 men (12,705 infantry, 2,251 cavalry, 700 artillery, 23 guns)

=== Notes ===
There is no exact muster of the French Army of Portugal at Vimeiro, so the unit strength is given for the end of the July.

Sir Charles Oman calculated that the French Army of Portugal at Vimeiro on the day of the battle (20 August) was:

- Infantry: 8,305 men
- Reserve Grenadiers: 2,100 men
- Cavalry: 1,951 men
- Artillery and other: 700 men

Total force: 13,056

== Sources ==
=== Printed ===
- Zimmermann, Dick. "The Battle of Vimeiro", Wargamer's Digest Magazine. October 1983.
