= Barnard Foord Bowes =

British Army officer (1769–1812)

Major-General Barnard Foord Bowes
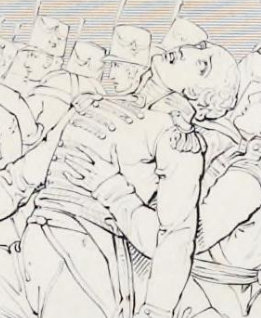
- Bowes represented at the moment of his death in a memorial to him
- Born: 10 July 1769; Yorkshire, England
- Died: 23 June 1812 (aged 42) Salamanca, Spain
- Allegiance: Great Britain; United Kingdom
- Branch: Infantry
- Service years: 1781–1812
- Rank: Major-General
- Conflicts: Irish Rebellion of 1798; Peninsular War; Battle of Roliça; Battle of Vimeiro; Siege of Badajoz; Siege of the Salamanca Forts †

Major-General Barnard Foord Bowes (10 July 1769 – 23 June 1812) was a British Army officer who commanded a brigade in several battles during the Peninsular War. He joined the 26th Foot Regiment as a junior officer in 1781 and rose in rank by purchase to become lieutenant colonel of the 6th Foot Regiment in 1796. He led troops during the Irish Rebellion of 1798. From 1799 to 1806 he served in Canada and married his wife there. He led a brigade at Roliça and Vimeiro in 1808. He was promoted to major general in 1810. He was severely wounded while leading his brigade in an assault during the 1812 Siege of Badajoz. He was killed in action leading a storming column at the Siege of the Salamanca Forts.

== Early career ==
Barnard Bowes Foord was born and baptized on 10 July 1769 at St Saviour's Church in York, Yorkshire, England. He was the oldest son of the Reverend Barnard Foord, Doctor of Law, and Ann Bowes. His family bought him an officer's commission and he joined the 26th Foot Regiment as an ensign on 25 October 1781 at the age of 12. He was promoted lieutenant in the same regiment on 8 August 1783. He became a captain in an independent company on 24 January 1791 and a captain in the 26th Foot on 2 February 1791 by exchange. On 17 May that year he changed his name to Barnard Foord Bowes so that he could inherit from his mother's family.

Except for a brief time with the independent company, Bowes served with the 26th Foot for 15 years. On 15 June 1796 he purchased the rank of major in the 85th Foot. Not quite six months later on 1 December 1796 he purchased the rank of lieutenant colonel in the 6th Foot and went to join the unit in Ireland. He assumed command of the 1st Battalion of the 6th Foot during the 1798 Irish Rebellion. One company of the regiment fought at Castlebar on 27 August and Ballinamuck on 8 September. Bowes and the regiment were shipped to Canada in 1799. He received the brevet rank of colonel on 1 January 1805.

While in Canada, Bowes married Catherine Maria Johnson on 15 April 1805. She was the daughter of Sir John Johnson, 2nd Baronet, the Superintendent of Indian Affairs. When Lieutenant General Peter Hunter died that August, Bowes became the commanding officer of all British troops in Canada by seniority. On 27 September 1806, Bowes resigned his command in Canada and rejoined his unit in England. Bowes and his wife settled in Beverley in Yorkshire. The couple had no children.

== Peninsular War ==
=== Portugal ===
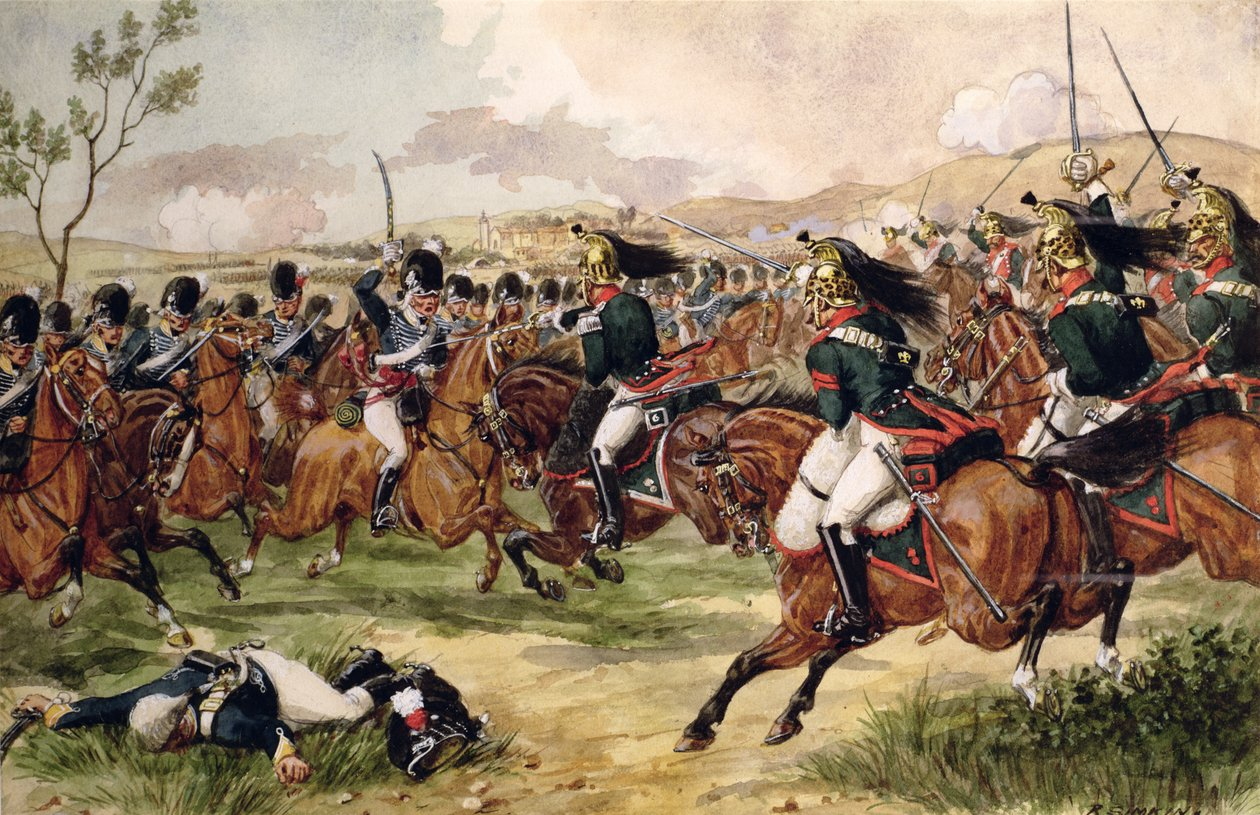
The Battle of Vimeiro

In 1807 Bowes and the 6th Foot were assigned to the garrison of Gibraltar. In the Dos de Mayo Uprising of May 1808, the Spanish people rose in revolt against the French troops occupying their country. Both the ruling Tories and the opposition Whigs saw the Spanish revolt as an opportunity for the United Kingdom to effectively intervene against Emperor Napoleon on the European continent. When the Spanish authorities declined the offer of soldiers, the British government determined to send an expedition to the Kingdom of Portugal which was occupied by French troops. Britain would send 9,000 men under Lieutenant General Arthur Wellesley from Ireland, a force under Major General Brent Spencer from Gibraltar, and two brigades from Harwich and Ramsgate, altogether 18,000 infantry and 390 cavalry.

On 1 August 1808, Wellesley's force landed at the mouth of the Mondego River near Figueira da Foz. On his own initiative, Spencer sailed from Gibraltar and landed his troops on 5 August. Wellesley spent until 9 August organizing his small army into six brigades before marching toward Lisbon. Lieutenant General Hew Whitefoord Dalrymple, who was Governor of Gibraltar, wrote to Spencer on 17 July that the British Army administration had not appointed Bowes a brigadier general on the staff. He therefore refused to appoint Bowes a brigadier. Dalrymple also noted that Bowes ought to return to Gibraltar, saying he was not properly attached to the command. Nevertheless, he gave Bowes permission to serve with Wellesley's expedition. Since Bowes was senior to several officers commanding brigades, Wellesley assumed that he was a brigadier general on the staff and assigned him to command the 4th Brigade with the rank of brigadier general.

The 4th Brigade consisted of the 1st Battalions of the 6th Foot (946 men) and the 32nd Foot (874 men). On 17 August, Wellesley's 13,000 British and 2,000 Portuguese fought 4,350 Frenchmen under General of Division Henri François Delaborde in the Battle of Roliça. Wellesley tried to envelop Delaborde's division. To this end, he sent the Portuguese to the right and Major General Ronald Craufurd Ferguson to the left with his own and Bowes' brigades plus six guns. When Delaborde evaded the trap and withdrew to a ridge, Ferguson's two brigades again tried to loop around the French flank. Meanwhile, the other brigades mounted a frontal attack on the French. Ferguson's two brigades got lost and when they finally appeared, Delaborde was in retreat. The following day, ships with 4,000 more British soldiers in two brigades appeared offshore near Vimeiro and Wellesley marched to meet them.

The Battle of Vimeiro was fought on 21 August 1808. Wellesley posted the brigades of Major General Rowland Hill, and Brigadier Generals Bowes, Miles Nightingall, Catlin Craufurd, and Wroth Palmer Acland on a prominent ridge on the right flank. On the left flank near Vimeiro were the brigades of Major General Ferguson, and Brigadier Generals Robert Anstruther and Henry Fane. When French General of Division Jean-Andoche Junot sent a force to the north, Wellesley quickly formed a new left flank by sending the brigades of Bowes, Nightingall, Ferguson, and Craufurd north. When they reached the northern ridge, Ferguson and half of Nightingall's brigades formed the first line while Bowes and half of Nightingall's brigades comprised the second line. The French attacked and all of Ferguson's and Nightingall's troops were engaged, but Bowes' brigade did not fire a shot or suffer any casualties. On 5 September, the new commander Dalrymple reorganized the army and sent Bowes back to Gibraltar.

=== Spain ===
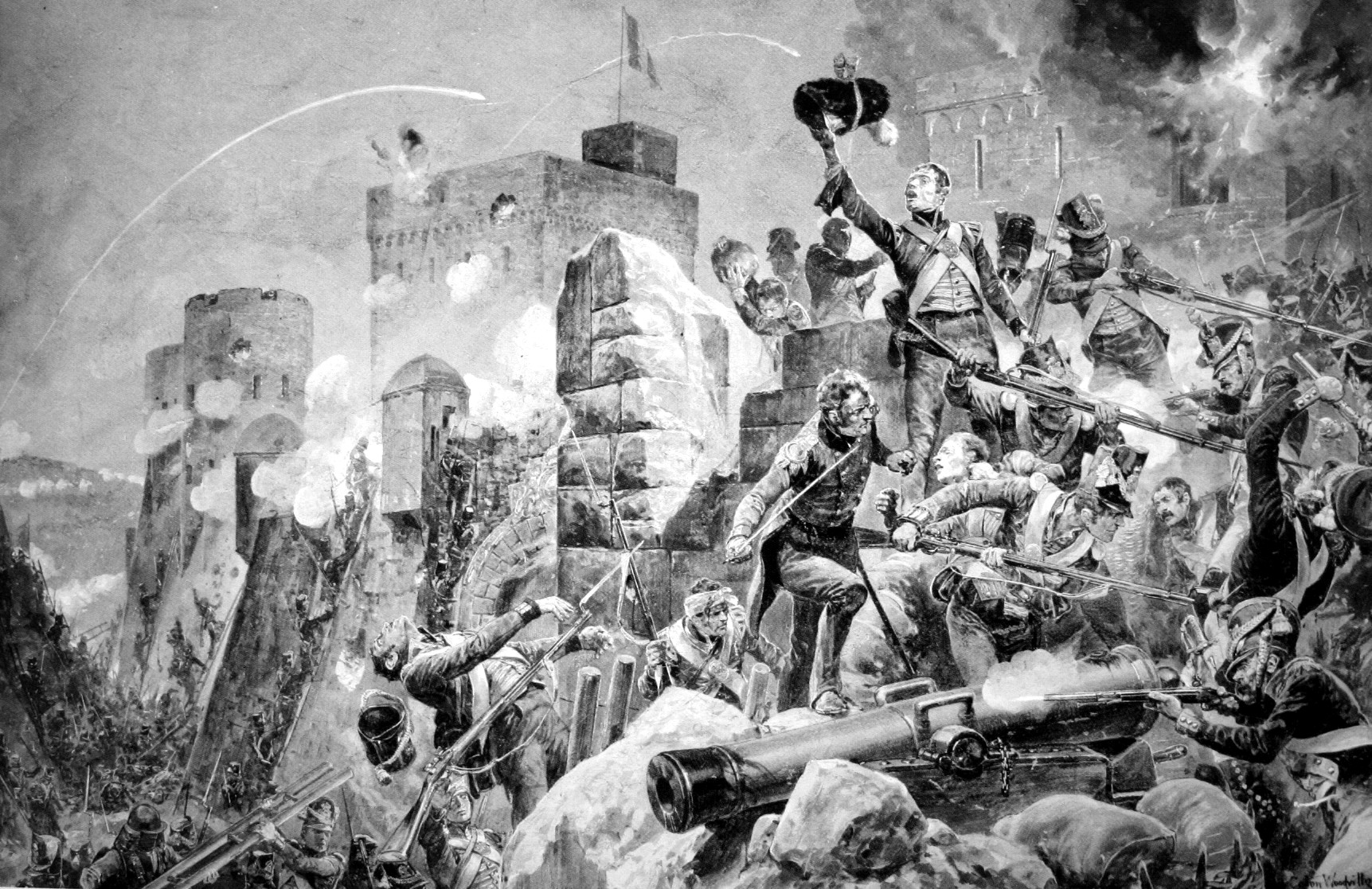
British 3rd Division soldiers successfully storm the castle of Badajoz

Bowes was a brigadier general on the staff from 1808 to 1810. On 7 February 1810, Bowes was sent to Cádiz with reinforcements and kept there by Lieutenant General William Stewart. Three weeks later, Wellesley (now called Wellington) wrote to Stewart, "I approve of your detaining Brig. Gen. Bowes, he is an officer of whom I am well acquainted, and is highly deserving of the confidence which you are disposed to place in him". However, Bowes returned to Gibraltar by 23 March. He took command of an expedition to Málaga to support Spanish General Luis de Lacy, but the force returned to Gibraltar without landing. He was promoted major general on 25 July 1810. In late 1811 Bowes was assigned to the staff of Wellington's army.

Bowes assumed command of the Fusilier Brigade in the 4th Division in February 1812. The Siege of Badajoz concluded with a successful assault on 6 April 1812. The three breaches blasted in the walls were the focus of the main attack. The 4th Division was ordered to storm the right and center breaches with 3,500 soldiers while the Light Division assaulted the left breach with 3,000 men. The main attack which began at 10 pm was a disaster. The advance party of the 4th Division, coming upon the ditch and thinking that the water in it was only ankle deep, jumped in. In fact the French had dug it out to a depth of 6 feet; twenty British and thirty Portuguese soldiers drowned. The survivors swerved to the left to avoid the inundation. When the advance parties of the 4th and Light Divisions entered the ditch, the French sappers ignited the incendiary devices and mines they had thickly sown. Scores of attackers were killed, burnt, or maimed in the blasts that followed. Every British engineer officer guiding the columns was killed or wounded almost at once, so the subsequent waves had little direction. The soldiers charged up the breaches again and again, only to be massacred by point blank musketry and cannon fire. After midnight, Wellington ordered the two divisions to retreat. Not counting Portuguese losses, the 4th Division suffered casualties of 84 officers and 841 men, while Light Division losses were 68 officers and 861 men.

The battle was won because the secondary attacks by the 3rd Division and 5th Division were both successful. When the 5th Division broke into the fortress and fired into the backs of the troops defending the breaches, the French surrendered in a body. The surviving British and Portuguese soldiers then went berserk as they sacked the city. Bowes' brigade included the 1/7th Foot, 1/23rd Foot, and 1/48th Foot. The 7th lost 49 killed and 131 wounded, the 23rd lost 25 killed, 106 wounded, and 20 drowned, and the 48th lost 35 killed and 138 wounded. While leading the assault on the right breach, Bowes was badly wounded; he was shot in the thigh and stabbed by a bayonet. His brother-in-law and aide-de-camp Captain James Johnson was killed in the battle. It took Bowes six weeks to recover from his injuries.

On 2 May 1812 while still recuperating, Bowes was assigned to command a brigade in the 6th Division. The brigade included the 2nd Foot, 1/32nd Foot. and the 1/36th Foot. On 13 June, Wellington's army mounted an offensive toward Salamanca. By 17 June the Allied army began the Siege of the Salamanca Forts, a trio of heavily fortified convents manned by 800 French soldiers and 36 cannons. Someone blundered and there was insufficient ammunition for the Allied army's four 18-pound siege cannons. By 23 June, the siege guns had run out of ammunition and the walls of the forts were still intact. Nevertheless, Wellington ordered the San Cayetano fort to be stormed at 10pm that night. The six British light companies of the 6th Division were selected to make the assault, roughly 300–400 soldiers. Bowes determined to lead the attack though this was normally the responsibility of lower-ranking officers. An engineer suggested an alternate route of attack that had more cover, but Bowes decided to charge straight up the glacis.

The moment the assault column emerged from cover it was taken under heavy fire, not only from San Cayetano, but also from the San Vincente fort. Many soldiers were hit before they got close to the fort. Of 20 ladders provided, only two were set against the objective. By the time the ladders were raised, the attack was plainly hopeless and no soldiers set foot on them. Bowes was slightly wounded in the initial rush. After having his injury dressed, he heard that the attack was stalled. He rushed back into the battle only to be shot down and killed at the foot of the ladders. With his death, the attackers lost heart and ran for cover. British casualties numbered six officers and 120 rank and file. Afterward, the British requested a truce to retrieve the dead and wounded but the French refused and Bowes' body had to be recovered later. Wellington wrote that Bowes "was so eager for the success of the enterprise, that he had gone forward with the storming party". There is a monument to Bowes in the Beverley Minster.
