= Vimieiro =

Vimieiro is the name of several places in Portugal:

- Vimiero (Arraiolos), a freguesia (civil parish) in Arraiolos Municipality
- Vimieiro (Braga), a civil parish in the municipality of Braga
- Vimieiro (Santa Comba Dão), a village in the municipality of Santa Comba Dão

== See also ==
- Vimeiro, a civil parish in the municipality of Lourinhã in Oeste (intermunicipal community)
  - Battle of Vimeiro, an 1808 victory of British forces under Wellington over French forces under Junot during the Peninsular War
    - Battle of Vimeiro order of battle
