= List of British general officers killed in the French Revolutionary and Napoleonic Wars =

This is a list of general officers of the British Armed Forces who were killed or died while on active service during the French Revolutionary and Napoleonic Wars. This comprises the period of 1793–1815, and includes British general officers who were serving in the British Army or attached to the allied Portuguese Army. Officers of the rank of colonel are included if they were acting in the position of a general officer, that being a brigade or larger, at the time of their death, despite them not themselves being general officers. Officers are also included if they had recently left a command at the time of their death, and their active service was the cause of it.

== Background ==
The death and injury rate of senior officers fighting in the French Revolutionary and Napoleonic Wars was unusually high. General officers of the period regularly demonstrated their courage and served to the forefront in battles, placing themselves in positions of high jeopardy. Sanitary and living conditions on military campaigns in the period were also poor, leading to a number of general officers succumbing to illness and disease while on service.

The historian Rory Muir contrasts this style of service for British general officers with that of their successors fighting in the First World War, saying that the added risks officers of the French Revolutionary and Napoleonic Wars put themselves in meant that their troops "never felt the alienation from their senior officers which developed during the First World War". The highest rate of death among general officers occurred during the Peninsular War, where fifteen per cent who served were killed, having a sixty per cent higher chance of dying than their junior officers.

== Generals ==
Image	Name	Branch	Date of death	Cause of death	Location	Command	References
	William Grinfield	British Army	19 October 1803	Yellow fever	Barbados, West Indies	Windward and Leeward Islands	
	William Villettes	British Army	13 July 1808	Yellow fever	Jamaica, West Indies	Lieutenant-Governor of Jamaica (Note: Villettes was a substantive lieutenant-general but held local rank as a general while serving as lieutenant-governor and commander-in-chief at Jamaica.)	

== Lieutenant-Generals ==
Image	Name	Branch	Date of death	Cause of death	Location	Command	References
	Sir John Vaughan	British Army	30 June 1795	Bowel complaint, possibly poison	Martinique, West Indies	Windward Islands	
	Sir Ralph Abercromby	British Army	28 March 1801	Hostile fire (small arms) (Note: Died of septicaemia after being shot in the leg at the Battle of Alexandria.)	Alexandria, Egypt	Egypt Army	
	Sir William Myers	British Army	29 July 1805	Illness	Barbados, West Indies	Windward and Leeward Islands	
	Sir John Moore	British Army	16 January 1809	Hostile fire (cannonball)	Coruña, Spain	Coruña Army	
	Hay MacDowall	British Army	c.16 March 1809	Lost at sea	Lady Jane Dundas, near the Cape of Good Hope	Madras Army	
	Alexander Mackenzie Fraser	British Army	13 September 1809	Illness	Britain (illness caught on active service)	4th Division, Walcheren campaign	
	Sir Thomas Picton	British Army	18 June 1815	Hostile fire (small arms)	Waterloo, Belgium	5th Division	

== Major-Generals ==
Image	Name	Branch	Date of death	Cause of death	Location	Command	References
	John Mansel	British Army	26 April 1794	Hostile fire (small arms)	Beaumont, France	2nd Cavalry Brigade, Flanders campaign	
	Thomas Dundas	British Army	3 June 1794	Yellow fever	Basseterre, Guadeloupe	Governor of Guadeloupe, West Indies campaign	
	Alexander Stewart	British Army	16 December 1794	Illness	Britain (illness caught on active service)	1st Brigade, Flanders campaign	
	Welbore Ellis Doyle	British Army	2 January 1798	Illness	Colombo, Ceylon	Governor of Ceylon	
	William Crosbie	British Army	16 June 1798	Suicide	Portsmouth, Britain	Lieutenant-Governor of Portsmouth	
	John Knox	British Army	October 1800	Lost at sea	HMS Babet, off Martinique	Governor of Jamaica	
	William Clephane	British Army	4 November 1803	Illness	Grenada, West Indies	Lieutenant-Governor of Grenada	
	Charles Barnett	British Army	10 October 1804	Yellow fever	Gibraltar	Second-in-command, Gibraltar	
	John Fraser	British Army	24 November 1804	Hostile fire (cannonball) (Note: Died of his wounds after losing a leg to a cannonball at the Battle of Deeg on 13 November.)	Deeg, India		
	Patrick Wauchope	British Army	31 March 1807	Hostile fire (small arms)	Rosetta, Egypt	Second-in-command, Alexandria expedition	
	Charles Baillie	British Army	c.16 March 1809	Lost at sea	Lady Jane Dundas, near the Cape of Good Hope		
	John Randoll Mackenzie	British Army	28 July 1809	Hostile fire (small arms)	Talavera, Spain	3rd Division	
	Coote Manningham	British Army	26 August 1809	Fatigue	Britain (fatigue caused on active service)	3rd Brigade, 1st Division, Coruña campaign	
	Nathaniel Massey, 2nd Baron Clarina	British Army	26 January 1810	Fever	Barbados, West Indies	Lieutenant-Governor of Barbados	
	Richard Stewart	British Army	19 October 1810	Fell off balcony while delirious with eye infection	Lisbon, Portugal	Brigade, 2nd Division	
	Daniel Hoghton	British Army	16 May 1811	Hostile fire (small arms)	Albuera, Spain	Brigade, 2nd Division (had replaced Stewart)	
	John Vesey	British Army	2 December 1811	Fever	Messina, Sicily		
	Henry MacKinnon	British Army	19 January 1812	Hostile fire (magazine explosion)	Ciudad Rodrigo, Spain	Brigade, 3rd Division	
	Robert Craufurd	British Army	24 January 1812	Hostile fire (small arms)	Ciudad Rodrigo, Spain	Light Division	
	Barnard Foord Bowes	British Army	23 June 1812	Hostile fire (small arms)	Salamanca, Spain	Brigade, 6th Division	
	John Le Marchant	British Army	22 July 1812	Hostile fire (small arms)	Salamanca, Spain	Brigade, 1st Cavalry Division	
	William Wheatley	British Army	1 September 1812	Typhus	San Lorenzo de El Escorial, Spain	Brigade, 1st Division	
	Richard Hulse	British Army	7 September 1812	Typhus	Arévalo, Spain	5th Division	
	George Harcourt	British Army	20 September 1812	Fever	St Croix, Caribbean	Governor of St Croix	
	Andrew Ross	British Army	26 September 1812	Fever	Cartagena, Spain	Cartagena garrison	
	Sir Isaac Brock	British Army	13 October 1812	Hostile fire (small arms)	Queenston, Upper Canada	Lieutenant Governor of Upper Canada	
	Sir William Erskine	British Army	13 February 1813	Suicide by jumping out of a window	Lisbon, Portugal	2nd Cavalry Division	
	William Frederick Spry	Portuguese Army	16 January 1814	Illness (Note: Recorded as dying from wounds received at the Siege of San Sebastián, or of an illness caught there.)	Southampton, Britain (illness caught on active service)	3rd Portuguese Brigade, 5th Division	
	Eberhardt Otto George von Bock	British Army	21 January 1814	Drowned	At sea, off Pleubian, France	Heavy Dragoon Brigade, King's German Legion	
	John Byne Skerrett	British Army	10 March 1814	Hostile fire (small arms)	Bergen op Zoom, Netherlands	Brigade, Bergen op Zoom	
	Andrew Hay	British Army	14 April 1814	Hostile fire	Bayonne, France	Brigade, 1st Division	
	Robert Ross	British Army	12 September 1814	Hostile fire (small arms)	North Point, United States	Brigade, United States	
	Sir Robert Rollo Gillespie	British Army	31 October 1814	Hostile fire (small arms)	Kalunga, India	Meerut Division, Bengal Army	
	Sir Samuel Gibbs	British Army	8 January 1815	Hostile fire	New Orleans, United States	Second-in-command, New Orleans expedition	
	Sir Edward Pakenham	British Army	8 January 1815	Hostile fire (small arms)	New Orleans, United States	New Orleans expedition	
	William Molesworth, 6th Viscount Molesworth	British Army	30 May 1815	Drowned	Arniston, off the Cape of Good Hope	Commandant of Galle	
	Sir William Ponsonby	British Army	18 June 1815	Hostile fire (small arms) (Note: Also recorded that he was stabbed to death by Polish lancers.)	Waterloo, Belgium	2nd Cavalry Brigade, Cavalry Corps	

== Brigadier-Generals ==
Image	Name	Branch	Date of death	Cause of death	Location	Command	References
	Richard Symes	British Army	19 July 1794	Hostile fire (small arms) (Note: Died of wounds (gangrene) received on 1 July.)	Saint Kitts, West Indies	Brigade, Invasion of Guadeloupe, West Indies campaign	
	Colin Lindsay	British Army	22 March 1795	Suicide by shooting	Grenada, West Indies	Grenada, Fédon's rebellion	
	Stephens Howe	British Army	20 July 1796	Yellow fever	Port Royal, Jamaica		
	Alexander Buchanan	British Army	December 1801	Fell out of a window	Saint Vincent, West Indies		
	Andrew Dunlop	British Army	21 August 1804	Fever	Antigua, West Indies		
	John Henry Yorke	British Army	1 November 1805	Drowned	At sea, off Brazil	Royal Artillery, Cape of Good Hope expedition	
	Crofton Vandeleur	British Army	30 October 1806	Fever	Antigua, West Indies		
	Robert Anstruther	British Army	14 January 1809	Pneumonia	Coruña, Spain	1st Brigade, Reserve Division, Coruña campaign	
	Joseph French	British Army	26 July 1809	Fatigue	Jamaica, West Indies	Second-in-command, Santo Domingo campaign	
	Ernst Eberhard Cuno Langwerth von Simmern	British Army	28 July 1809	Hostile fire (grapeshot)	Talavera, Spain	3rd Brigade, 1st Division	
	Neil Talbot	Portuguese Army	11 July 1810	Hostile fire	Barquilla, Spain	Portuguese cavalry	
	James Catlin Craufurd	British Army	25 September 1810	Malaria	Abrantes, Portugal	Brigade, 2nd Division	
	Robert Nicholson	British Army	13 October 1810	Yellow fever	Antigua, West Indies	Governor of Antigua	
	William Campbell	Portuguese Army	2 January 1811	Illness	Trocifal, Lines of Torres Vedras, Portugal	5th Portuguese Brigade	
	Charles Millar	Portuguese Army	February 1811	Illness	Portugal	Portuguese Militia	
	George Drummond	British Army	8 September 1811	Trench mouth	Fuenteguinaldo, Spain	2nd Brigade, Light Division	
	Francis Colman	Portuguese Army (Note: Colman held only a Portuguese commission, having mistakenly resigned his British commission in 1805.)	12 December 1811	Fever	Lisbon, Portugal	6th Portuguese Brigade, 7th Division	
	Richard Collins	Portuguese Army	17 February 1813	Exhaustion	Gouveia, Portugal	6th Portuguese Brigade, 7th Division	
	William Harvey	Portuguese Army	10 June 1813	Illness (Note: Caused by wounds taken at the Siege of Badajoz.)	At sea, en route to Britain	9th Portuguese Brigade, 4th Division	
	Arthur Gore	British Army	8/9 March 1814	Hostile fire	Bergen op Zoom, Netherlands	Brigade, Bergen op Zoom	

== Colonels ==
Image	Name	Branch	Date of death	Cause of death	Location	Command	References
	John Campbell	British Army	16 February 1794	Hostile fire	Martinique, West Indies	Grenadier Brigade, Battle of Martinique	
	Thomas Vandeleur	British Army	1 November 1803	Hostile fire	Alwar, India	1st Brigade, Laswari	
	James Wynch	British Army	6 January 1811	Dysentery	Lisbon, Portugal	2nd Brigade, Light Division	
	George Wilson	British Army	5 January 1813	Fever	Moraleja, Spain	Brigade, 2nd Division	
	Henry Cadogan	British Army	21 June 1813	Hostile fire	Vitoria, Spain	1st Brigade, 2nd Division	
	Georg Carl August du Plat	British Army	21 June 1815	Hostile fire	Waterloo, Belgium	1st Brigade, King's German Legion, 2nd Division	
