= John Bramston =

John Bramston may refer to:

- Sir John Bramston the Elder (1577–1654), English judge and Chief Justice of the King's Bench
- Sir John Bramston the Younger (1611–1700), son of Sir John Bramston, the elder; barrister and member of parliament for Essex
- John Bramston (priest) (1802–1889), vicar of Witham, Dean of Winchester, a descendant of the younger
- Sir John Bramston (Australian politician) (1832–1921), barrister, Queensland politician and British colonial administrator

== See also ==
- John Bramston School, Witham, Essex
