= Napoleonic Wars casualties =

Total fatalities of the Napoleonic Wars

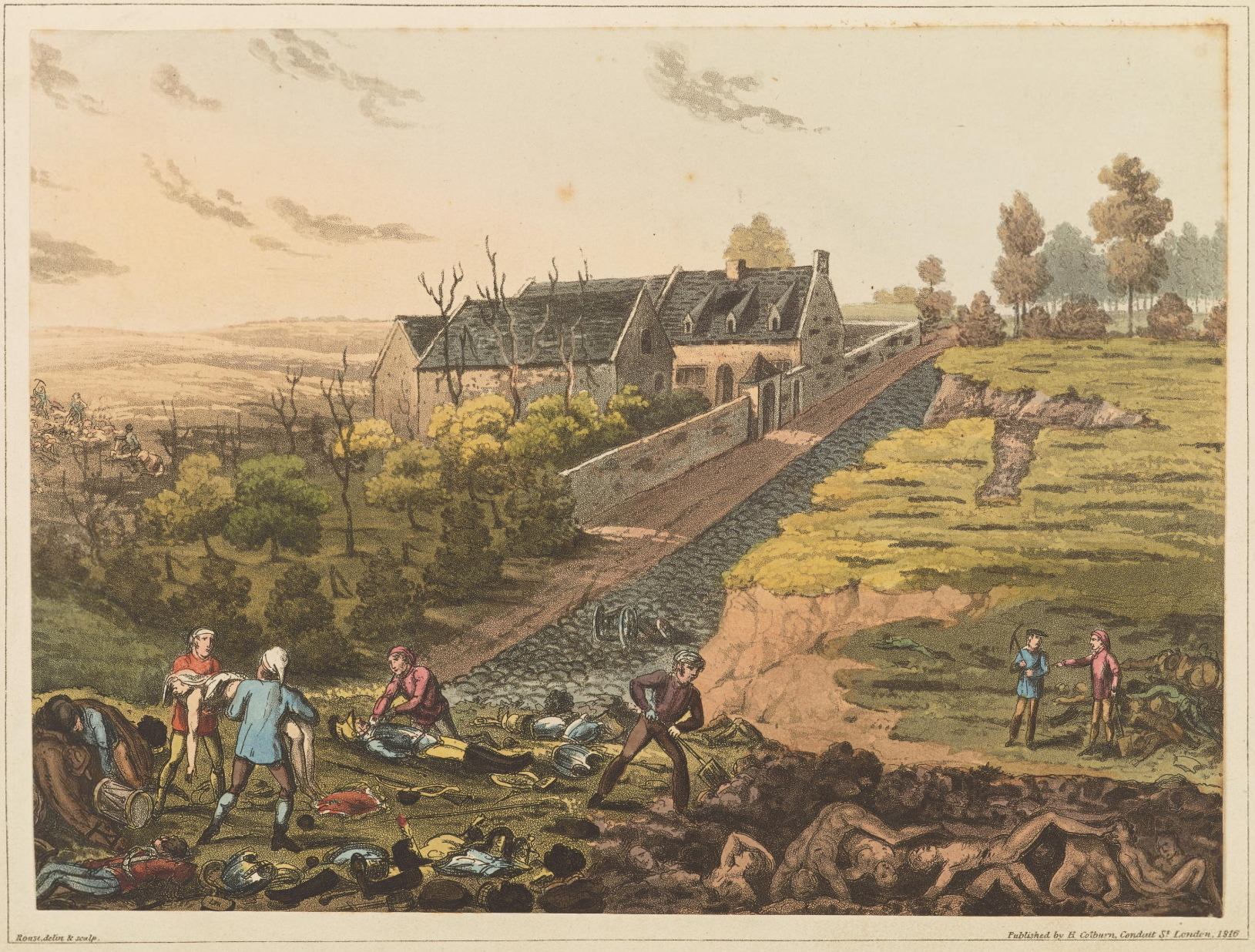
A mass grave of soldiers killed at the Battle of Waterloo

The casualties of the Napoleonic Wars (1803–1815), direct and indirect, are broken down below:

Note that the following deaths listed include both killed in action as well as deaths from other causes: diseases such as those from wounds; of starvation; exposure; drowning; friendly fire; and atrocities. Medical treatments were changed drastically at this time. 'Napoleon's Surgeon', Baron Dominique Jean Larrey, used horse-drawn carts as ambulances to quickly remove the wounded from the field of battle. This method became so successful that he was subsequently asked to organize the medical care for the 14 armies of the French Republic. With the partial exception of the United Kingdom, all of the states at the time did not keep especially accurate records, so calculating losses is to a certain extent a matter of conjecture.

== France ==
- 306,000 French and 65,000 French allies (Italians, etc.) killed in action (1803-1815), 764,000 French and 200,000 French allies wounded in action (1803-1815) (includes those who later died of wounds)
- 1,000,000-1,200,000 French and allied total military dead (1803-1815)
- 1,800,000 French and allies total dead, wounded, or missing (1803-1815)

The first definitive estimate of French war dead occurred in 1832, when the head of the conscription division under the imperial regime filed a report to the Chambre des Pairs on the drafting of a new law on recruitment. This report estimated that 1.7 million French soldiers died in the 1803-1815 wars. The above figures are per Gaston Bodart, who found the latter figure to be an overestimate (and likely including deaths in 1792-1799) after closer analysis of the data. Bodart (1916) and Meynier (1930) both calculated between 800,0000 and 1,000,000 French soldiers (not counting allies) dead in the period of 1803-1815 (taking the ratio of French to allied losses and combat to noncombat losses, Bodart's estimates would put specifically French deaths at some 824,000). Boris Urlanis used Bodart's figure for 306,000 French soldiers killed in combat but assumed a higher noncombat death ratio of about 3:1, putting total French military deaths at 1,200,000.

Jacques Houdaille later performed a more detailed study using the army's nominal rolls, taking a statistical sample of them at a scale of 1:500 (3 million French soldiers fought in the 1792-1815 wars, about 2.8 million on land and 150,000 at sea; 2.3 million were mobilized in 1800-1815). According to his research, some 439,000 soldiers and officers from France were confirmed dead in combat or in hospital and 706,000 were declared missing. Houdaille then estimated, using a survey of civil registers, how many former soldiers returned home after 1815 without being registered by the military administration. Deducting these men, he concluded that some 900,000 to 1 million French soldiers died from 1800 to 1815, consistent with Bodart, Meynier, and Ulranis's shared range of 800,000 to 1,200,000 French dead for 1803-1815, and implying a roughly 2:1 rate of noncombat to combat deaths. Deaths were slanted heavily towards the later years of the conflict and roughly half of them happened in 1812-1814.

Naval, coastal, and colonial actions in 1803-1815 accounted for a total of 13,750 French and allied battle deaths, and therefore from 37,000 to 55,000 total military deaths (Bodart's total of 371,000 French and allied killed out of 1,000,000 dead indicates a noncombat to combat death ratio of about 1.7:1 compared to Ulranis's 3:1 and Houdaille's 2:1). Inclusive of these, Bodart breaks down French and allied killed in action figures by year as follows:

- 1803-1804: 4,850
- 1805: 13,600
- 1806: 10,350
- 1807: 21,650
- 1808: 9,850
- 1809: 51,950
- 1810: 13,700
- 1811: 19,650
- 1812: 112,000
- 1813: 81,800
- 1814: 21,500
- 1815: 14,700
- Total: 370,750 killed in action

Casualties taken in specific campaigns include:

Peninsular War (1807-1814):

- 180,000–240,000 dead
- 91,000 killed in action

Invasion of Russia (1812):

- 300,000 dead
- 100,000 killed in action (70,000 French and 30,000 allied)

The effect of the war on France over this time period was considerable. Estimates of the total French military losses during the wars vary from 500,000 to 3 million dead. Tom Philo estimated 1,706,000 dead between 1792 and 1815, plus 600,000 civilians. According to David Gates, the Napoleonic Wars cost France at least 916,000 men from 1803 to 1815. This represents 38% of the conscription class of 1790–1795. This rate is over 14% higher than the losses suffered by the same generation one hundred years later fighting Imperial Germany. The French population suffered long-term effects through a low male-to-female population ratio. At the beginning of the Revolution, the numbers of males to females was virtually identical. By the end of the conflict only 0.857 males remained for every female. Combined with new agrarian laws under the Napoleonic Empire that required landowners to divide their lands to all their sons rather than the first born, France's population never recovered. By the middle of the 19th century, France had lost its demographic superiority over Germany and Austria and the United Kingdom (UK).

== Coalition forces ==
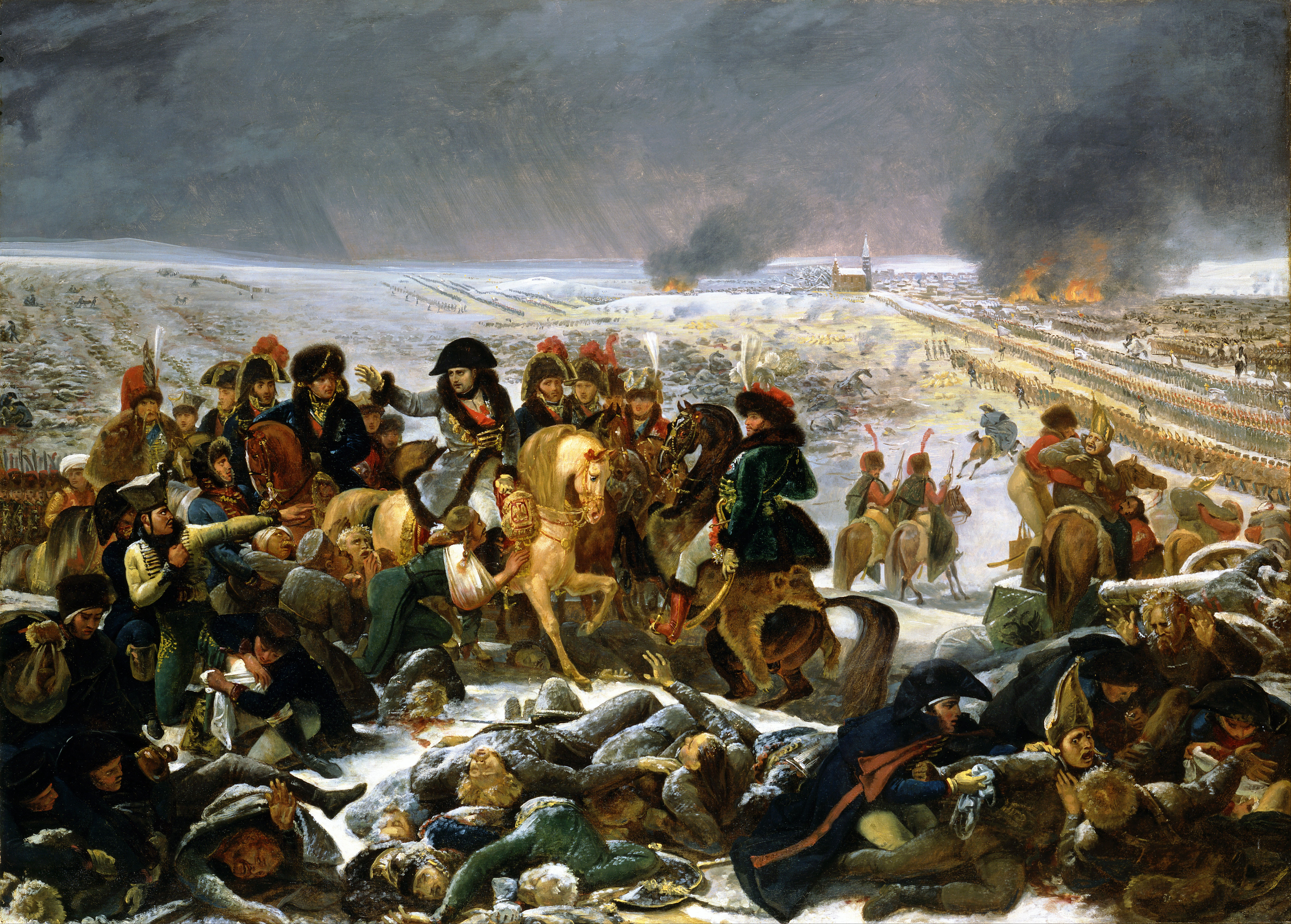
Napoleon on the field of Eylau

The below figures only include casualties in major battles in the years of 1803 to 1815. Dumas suggests multiplying the former total by three to include minor battles and non-combat deaths (mainly disease). Urlanis states that Dumas was mistaken in his assumption and that the following figures refer to killed and wounded in those battles, rather than simply killed as Dumas had assumed.

- Russian: 289,000 killed or wounded in major battles
- Prussian: 134,000 killed or wounded in major battles
- Austrian: 376,000 killed or wounded in major battles

Accounting for minor battles and non-combat deaths, Urlanis calculates total military deaths for these three belligerents in 1803-1815 as follows:

- Russia: 450,000 total military dead
- German (including Prussia): 400,000 total military dead
- Austrian: 200,000 total military dead
- Spanish: 300,000+ total military dead, more than 586,000 killed including civilians.
- Italian: 120,000 total military dead (mostly in Napoleon's service)
- Portuguese: 50,000 total military dead, up to 250,000 dead or missing including civilians
- Other (including Napoleon's allies): 130,000 total military dead

British losses for this period are the most detailed and well-documented. Roughly 1 million men served in the British military from 1793 to 1815, including 793,110 in the army and around 250,000 in the navy. In 1803-1815 they sustained the following losses:

- British: 311,806 total military dead or missing

Royal Navy, 1804–1815:

- killed in action: 6,663
- shipwrecks, drownings, fire: 13,621
- wounds, disease: 72,102

Total: 92,386

British Army, 1804–1815:

- killed in action: 25,569
- died of wounds, accidents, disease: 193,851
- wounded and lived: 70,708

Total: 219,420

Other counts of total deaths

- Killed in battle: 560,000–1,869,000
- Total: 2,380,000–5,925,084

== Total dead and missing ==
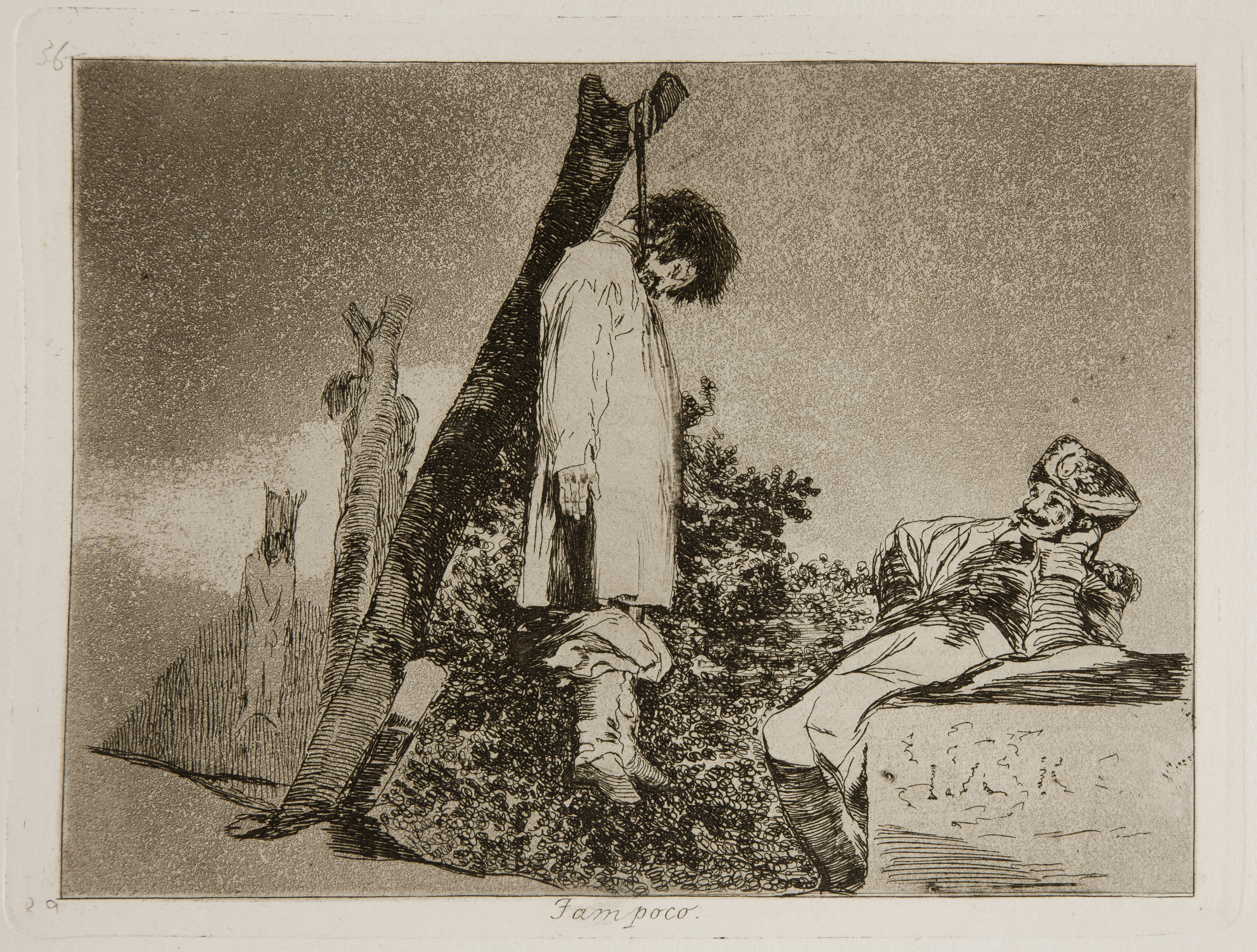
The Disasters of War by Francisco Goya

- 2,500,000 military personnel in Europe
- 1,000,000 civilians were killed in Europe and in rebellious French overseas colonies.

Total: 3,500,000 casualties

David Gates estimated that 5,000,000 died in the Napoleonic Wars. He does not specify if this number includes civilians or is just military.

Charles Esdaile says 5,000,000–7,000,000 died overall, including civilians. These numbers are subject to considerable variation. Erik Durschmied, in his book The Hinge Factor, gives a figure of 1.4 million French military deaths of all causes. Adam Zamoyski estimates that around 400,000 Russian soldiers died in the 1812 campaign alone. By contrast, Micheal Clodfelter gives the figure of 289,000 in Russian battles between 1805 and 1814. Civilian casualties in the 1812 campaign were probably comparable. Alan Schom estimates some 3 million military deaths in the Napoleonic wars. Common estimates of more than 500,000 French dead in Russia in 1812 and 250,000–300,000 French dead in Iberia between 1808 and 1814 give a total of at least 750,000, and to this must be added hundreds of thousands of more French dead in other campaigns—probably around 150,000 to 200,000 French dead in the German campaign of 1813, for example. Thus, it is fair to say that the estimates above are highly conservative.

Civilians deaths are impossible to accurately estimate. While military deaths are invariably put at between 2.5 million and 3.5 million, civilian death tolls vary from 750,000 to 3 million. Given the above estimates of military and civilian deaths, the total death count is between 3,250,000 and 6,500,000.

== See also ==
- List of British general officers killed in the French Revolutionary and Napoleonic Wars
