= Trant's raid =

1810 recapture during the Peninsular War

Trant's Raid
- Part of the Peninsular War
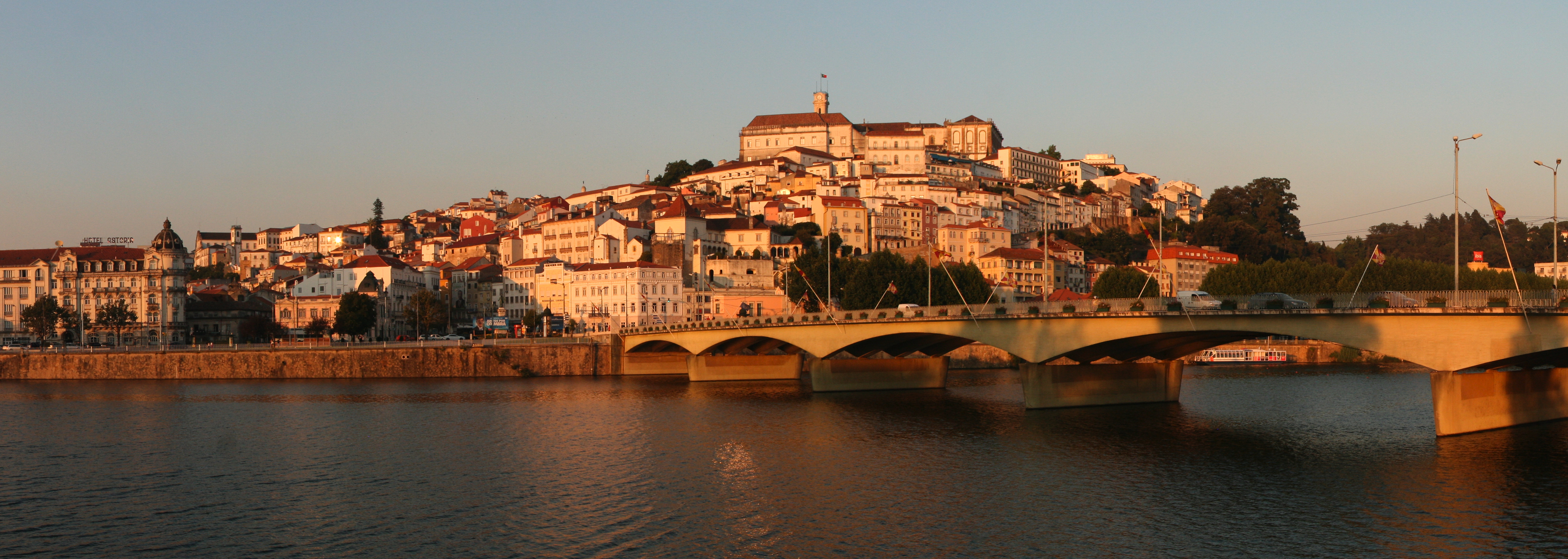
- Coimbra
| Date | 6 October 1810 |
| Location | Coimbra, Portugal 40°12′N 8°25′W |
| Result | Portuguese victory |

Belligerents
| Portugal | (France) French Empire |

Commanders and leaders
| (United Kingdom) Nicholas Trant | Unknown |

Strength
| 4,000 Portuguese militia | Unknown |

Casualties and losses
| 3 killed 26 wounded | 8 killed 4,000 captured |

Peninsular War
Third French invasion:
1 Siege of Astorga March April 1810
2 Siege of Ciudad Rodrigo April 1810
3 Siege of Almeida July 1810
3.1 Blockade of Almeida April 1811
4 Battle of Bussaco September 1810
5 Torres Vedras protects Lisbon
6 Battle of Redinha March 1811
7 Battle of Sabugal April 1811
8 Battle of Fuentes de Oñoro May 1811

Trant's raid was the Portuguese recapture of the city of Coimbra from the French on 6 October 1810 during the Peninsular War. The assault was undertaken by a Portuguese militia led by Colonel Nicholas Trant, an Irish officer in the British Army.

== Battle ==
Marshal André Masséna's army had captured Coimbra and established a base there. On 7 October Trant and 4,000 Portuguese militia recaptured the city. French losses were 8 killed and 400 able-bodied soldiers captured. About 3,500 sick and wounded, plus several hundred medical and service personnel also surrendered. Trant's losses were only 3 men killed and another 26 men wounded.

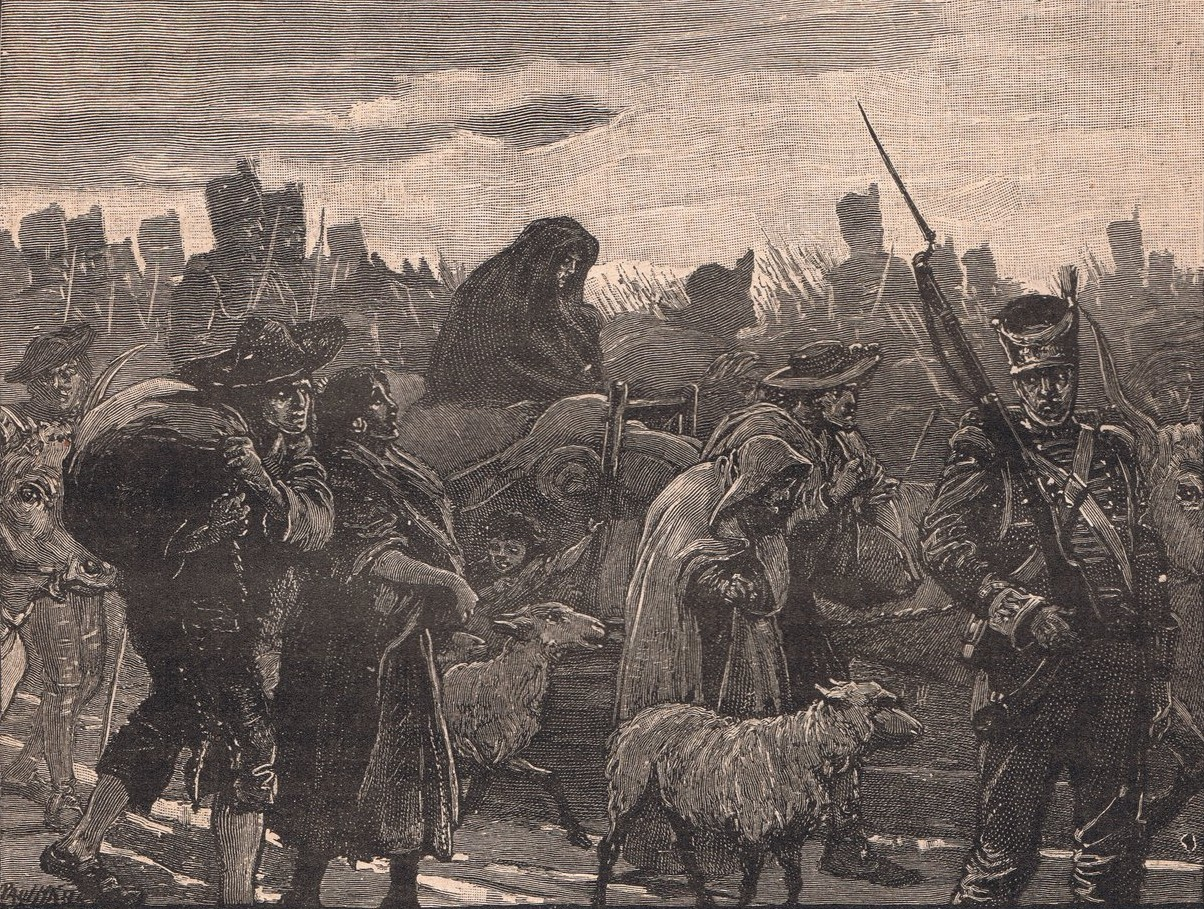
Wellingtons retreat from Coimbra

== Aftermath ==
As the new governor of the city, he remained in possession of the city all winter while the French carried out their futile blockade of the Lines of Torres Vedras
