= Battle of Roliça =

1808 battle of the Peninsular War

- Part of the Peninsular War
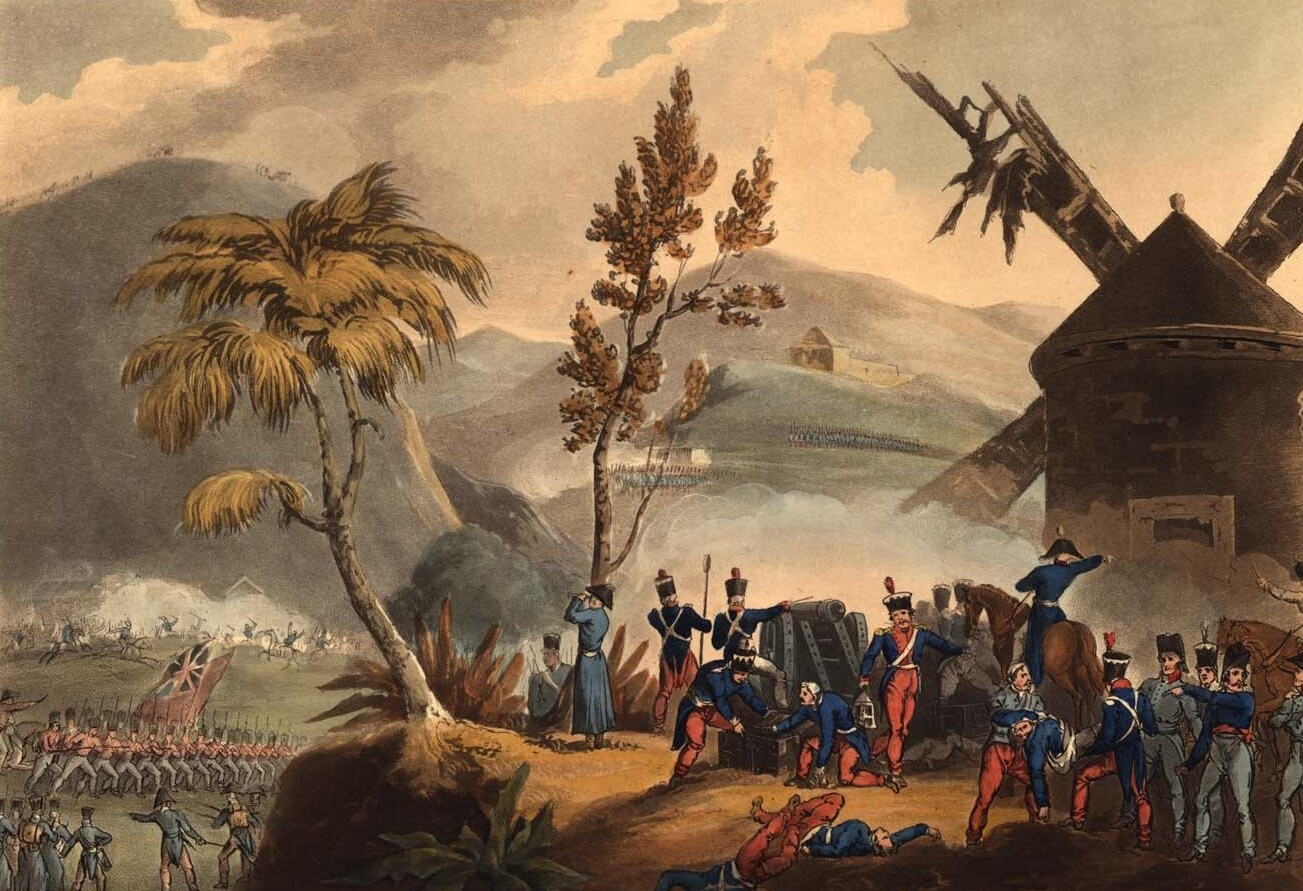
- Battle of Roliça; William Heath, 1815
| Date | 17 August 1808 |
| Location | Near Roliça, Portugal 39.3136°N 9.1836°W |
| Result | Anglo-Portuguese victory |

Belligerents
| (First French Empire) French Empire: Swiss Confederation | (United Kingdom of Great Britain and Ireland) United Kingdom; Portugal |

Commanders and leaders
| (First French Empire) Henri Delaborde | (United Kingdom of Great Britain and Ireland) Arthur Wellesley |

Strength
| 4,000–4,930; 5 guns | 14,800–15,700; 20 guns |

Casualties and losses
| 600–700 killed, wounded or captured 3 guns lost | 70 killed 335 wounded 81 missing |

Peninsular war: Portugal
1807 1808 1809 1810 1811

At the Battle of Roliça (17 August 1808), the first battle fought by the British army during the Peninsular War, an Anglo-Portuguese army under Sir Arthur Wellesley defeated an outnumbered Imperial French division under General of Division Henri François Delaborde, near the village of Roliça in Portugal. The French retired in good order.

== Background ==
In the months after occupying Portugal, Napoleon attempted the conquest and control of Spain. He met much resistance but it was disorganised even when it was effective. By the end of July the Spanish had met the French a dozen times, winning, or at least not losing, at seven of those meetings. Their most spectacular victory was in southern Spain on 23 July 1808, when General Castaños surrounded and forced 18,000 French under General Dupont to surrender at Bailén. On 30 July 1808, the French division of General Louis Henri Loison massacred the population, men, women, and children, of Évora. Both of these events were to have an effect on the future of each nation's relationships with British troops.

On the same day, Wellesley received a letter from Robert Stewart, Viscount Castlereagh, the Secretary of State for War, that informed him that General Jean-Andoche Junot's forces numbered more than 25,000. Castlereagh forwarded his plans to augment the British Army in Portugal by another 15,000 men. General Sir John Moore was to arrive with an army from Sweden, and another force would be forwarded from Gibraltar. The command of this larger force would pass to Sir Hew Dalrymple (the Governor of Gibraltar, a 60-year-old general who had seen active service only in a failed campaign in Flanders in 1793–1794). Dalrymple would be seconded by Sir Harry Burrard, attended by five other generals, all senior to Wellesley (Dalrymple, Burrard, Moore, John Hope, Alexander Fraser, and Lord Paget). The ambitious Lieutenant General Wellesley hoped to make something happen during the time he still commanded the army in Portugal.

On 30 July 1808, General Wellesley rendezvoused with Admiral Charles Cotton's convoy with Wellesley's troops at Mondego bay. Wellesley chose this as his landing point because students from Coimbra University had seized the fort making this a safer landing than any place nearer Lisbon. The disembarking of Wellesley's original 16,000 troops and supplies with the 6,000 they met off Portugal lasted from 1 to 8 August. Some landing craft capsized in the rough surf making the first British casualties in the Peninsula victims of drowning.

The army marched off on the 10th on the hot and sandy 12-mile (19 km) march to Leiria. Wellesley arrived on the 11th and soon argued with General Bernardim Freire de Andrade, the commander of 6,000 Portuguese troops, about supplies and the best route to Lisbon. The result had Wellesley taking his preferred route, close to the sea and his supplies, with 1,700 of the Portuguese under the command of Colonel Nicholas Trant, a British officer in service with the Portuguese Army.

The Anglo-Portuguese force then began its march toward Lisbon following the French troops under the command of General Delaborde, who had been sent by Junot to harass and hold the British while he brought his larger army into position.

By 14 August the British reached Alcobaça and moved on to Óbidos. Here the British vanguard, consisting of riflemen from the 5th/60th and 95th Rifles, met pickets and the rearguard of the French forces. The 4,000 French were outnumbered approximately four to one.

== Composition of forces ==
=== British ===
The Anglo-Portuguese were formed in six brigades under Major General Rowland Hill, Major General Ronald Craufurd Ferguson, Brigadier General Miles Nightingall, Brigadier General Barnard Foord Bowes, Brigadier General Catlin Craufurd, and Brigadier General Henry Fane with the Portuguese under Trant. Trant with the Portuguese and 50 cavalry formed the right and were to turn the French left. Ferguson and Bowes with three companies of riflemen and some light artillery were to force the French right and hold against the possible arrival of French troops under Loison. Hill, Nightingall, Craufurd, Fane with the remaining Portuguese, and the rest of the guns and cavalry were to push the centre. British forces involved in the battle included:

- Artillery, commanded by Colonel Robe
  - 6 Artillery Guns detached to Left division
  - 12 Artillery Guns detached to Centre Division
- Left Division, commanded by General Ferguson
  - Ferguson's Brigade – 36th (Herefordshire) Regiment of Foot, 1/40th (the 2nd Somersetshire) Regiment of Foot, and 1/71st (Highland) Regiment of Foot
  - Bowes Brigade – 1/6th (1st Warwickshire) Regiment of Foot and 1/32nd (Cornwall) Regiment of Foot
- Centre Division
  - 20th Regiment of (Light) Dragoons (detachment), 6th (Bragança) Portuguese Cavalry, 12th (Miranda) Portuguese Cavalry, and 6th (Oporto) Portuguese Caçadores (in reserve) – Brigade taken from Portuguese 3rd (Northern) Division
  - Fane's Brigade – 5/60th (Royal American) Regiment and 2/95th Rifles (on the left)
  - Nightingall's Brigade – 29th (Worcestershire) Regiment of Foot and 82nd Regiment of Foot (Prince of Wales's Volunteers) (in the centre)
  - Hill's Brigade – 5th Regiment of Foot (Northumberland Fusiliers), 9th (East Norfolk) Regiment of Foot, and 38th (1st Staffordshire) Regiment of Foot (on the right)
  - Catlin Craufurd's Brigade – 45th (Nottinghamshire) (Sherwood Foresters) Regiment of Foot, 50th (Queen's Own) Regiment of Foot, and 91st (Argyllshire Highlanders) Regiment of Foot (in reserve)
- Right Division, commanded by Colonel Trant
  - 20th Regiment of (Light) Dragoons (detachment), 11th (Almeida) Portuguese Cavalry Regiment (50 men, from 2nd (Central) Division), 12th (Chaves) Portuguese Infantry Regiment, 21st (Valenca) Portuguese Infantry Regiment, and 24th (Braganca) Portuguese Infantry Regiment – Brigade taken from the 3rd (Northern) Division

=== French ===
The French forces under Delaborde consisted of five battalions, including one Swiss, and five guns. The small French/Swiss force included:

- 70éme Régiment d'Infanterie de Ligne (2 battalions)
- 4éme Régiment Suisse d'Infanterie (1 battalion)
- 2éme Régiment Légère (1 battalion)
- 4éme Régiment Légère (1 battalion)
- 26éme Régiment de Chasseurs

== Battlefield ==
The village of Roliça is located in the centre of a horseshoe shape of steep hills approximately one mile wide and two deep. The open end opens north-northeast toward Óbidos where the 5/60th and 95th had met the French the day before. The hills around Óbidos and Roliça were well wooded.

The French began the day to the north of Roliça backed up to the higher ground allowing them to block or protect the roads south toward Lisbon. On the hill about one mile to the south of the village where the French first fell back, there were four defiles, or gullies leading into the new French position. The fields below these hills were grassy, but boulders and the steep sides to the gullies made attack in formation impossible. In the first stages of the battle, Delaborde pulled his troops back to the top of the hill.

== Battle ==
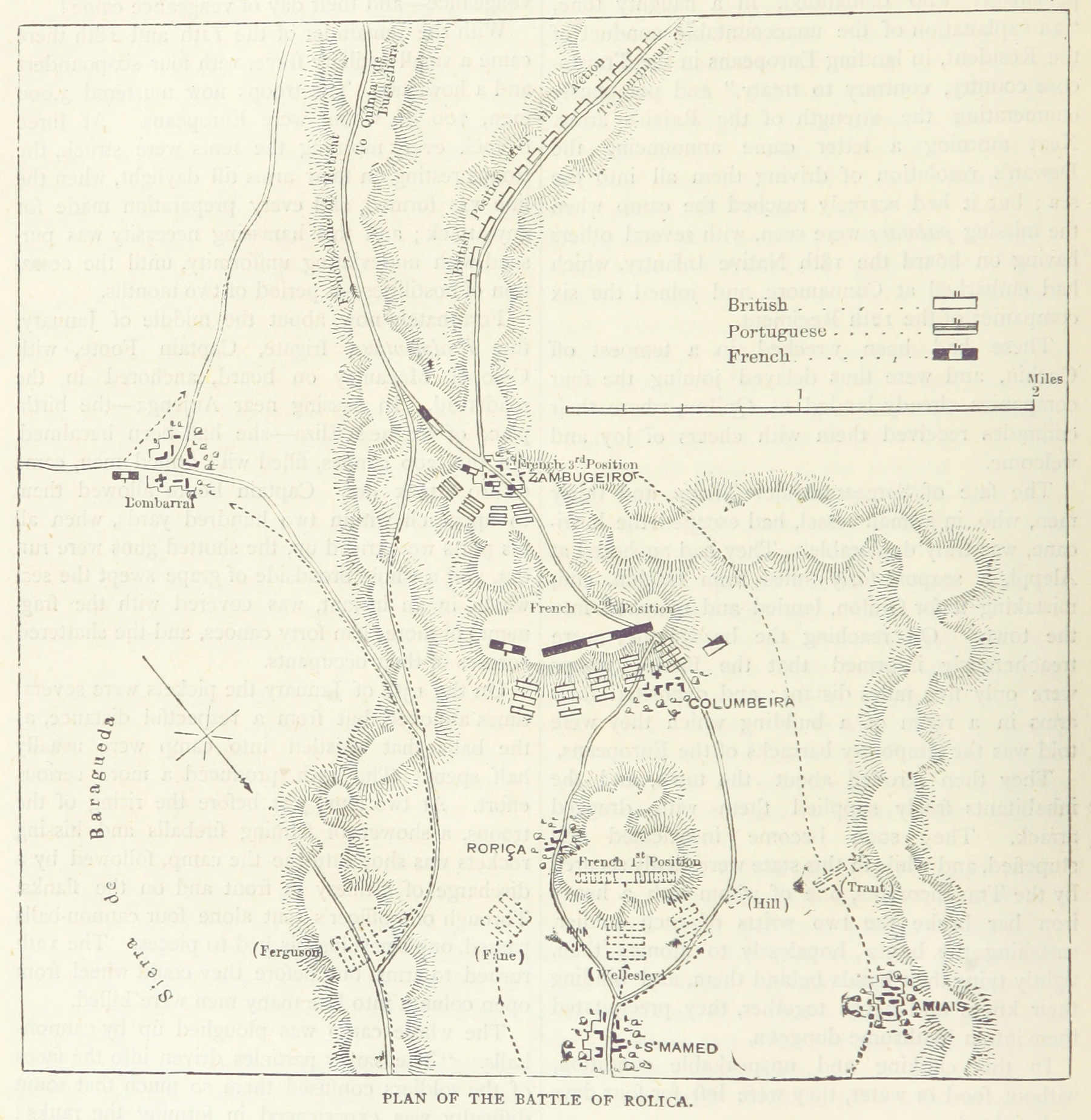
An 1873 map of the battle (British Battles on Land and Sea, vol. 2). British Library.

Wellesley arrived at Óbidos on 16 August and moved toward Roliça on the following day. At the beginning of the battle, Delaborde occupied a position to the north-northwest of the village of Roliça. Wellesley attempted to manoeuvre his forces into a double envelopment, moving to each flank of the French position with his main force organised into three fighting columns of brigades. This could be attempted since the Anglo-Portuguese army outnumbered the French forces present by over 3 to 1. He sent Trant to the west, and a stronger force under Fergusson and Bowes with six guns to the east, while he distracted the French with a show of force and noise in the centre. Wellesley tried the manoeuvre twice starting at 9 am, but the French commander spotted this in time and fell back each. At this time the French final position was to the south and east of the village at the top of a steep hill that was littered with sharp rocks and the only way up was using narrow gullies.

Lieutenant-colonel George Lake of the 29th Regiment of Foot in the centre then made the mistake of leading his regiment's grenadier company up a gully toward the French position. He arrived behind Delaborde, whose entrenched troops opened fire, killing Lake. This prompted a general attack in relief by the outnumbering British. The fight was rough and uphill with Delaborde hoping for support to arrive from Loison. He repulsed three British assaults until nearly 4 pm. At this time Wellesley ordered a general advance to support the 29th and 9th Foot. They swarmed up the rock face using their superior numbers to reach the French positions at the top of the hill and Ferguson arrived over the hills to the east. Delaborde began to withdraw in good order with effective aid from his cavalry until his army's discipline broke and his army ran. Without British cavalry to press the pursuit, they successfully withdrew to Montachique near Torres Vedras.

== Results ==
The Anglo-Portuguese won with 487 casualties, over half that number from the precipitate 29th. The French lost 700 men and three of their five guns. Delaborde himself was wounded. The following day Wellesley found that the 4,000 additional British troops had arrived from England and were off the coast. He marched his men to cover their disembarkation rather than follow Delaborde.

== Aftermath ==
The British intervention proceeded with the Battle of Vimeiro on 21 August 1808. This was the last battle in which the British Army wore their hair pulled back into queues, although the 29th Foot retained theirs until after Vimeiro.

== See also ==
- Timeline of the Peninsular War

== Notes ==
| Preceded by Battle of Bailén | Napoleonic Wars; Battle of Roliça | Succeeded by Battle of Vimeiro |
