= John Bramston (priest) =

John Bramston (12 May 1802 – 13 November 1889) was Dean of Winchester (1872–1883).

He was the younger son of Thomas Gardiner Bramston, who owned Skreens estate in Roxwell, Essex and was a member of Parliament for Essex, and the younger brother of Thomas William Bramston, who inherited Skreens and was an MP for South Essex. He was also a descendant of his namesakes Sir John Bramston, the elder and the latter's son Sir John Bramston, the younger.

He went to Oriel College, Oxford and graduated with a B.A. in 1823. He became vicar of Great Baddow, Essex in 1831 and vicar of Witham in 1840. He became Dean of Winchester in October 1872 and resigned the post in 1883.

He married the diarist Clarissa Sandford Trant (daughter of the soldier Nicholas Trant) in 1832; she died in 1844, leaving three children: Clara Isabella Sandford Bramston (b. 1833), Mary Eliza Bramston (b. 1841), and Rev. John Trant Bramston (b. 1843). In 1846, he married Anna, daughter of Osgood Hanbury, of Holfield Grange, Essex. His daughter by his second marriage, Anna, founded Winchester High School, now known as St Swithun's School. Granddaughter Clara Georgina Luard published a selection from Clarissa Trant's twenty-eight volume journal in 1925.

Church of England titles
| Preceded by Thomas Garnier | Dean of Winchester; 1872 – 1883 | Succeeded by George William Kitchin |
