= 20th Light Dragoons =

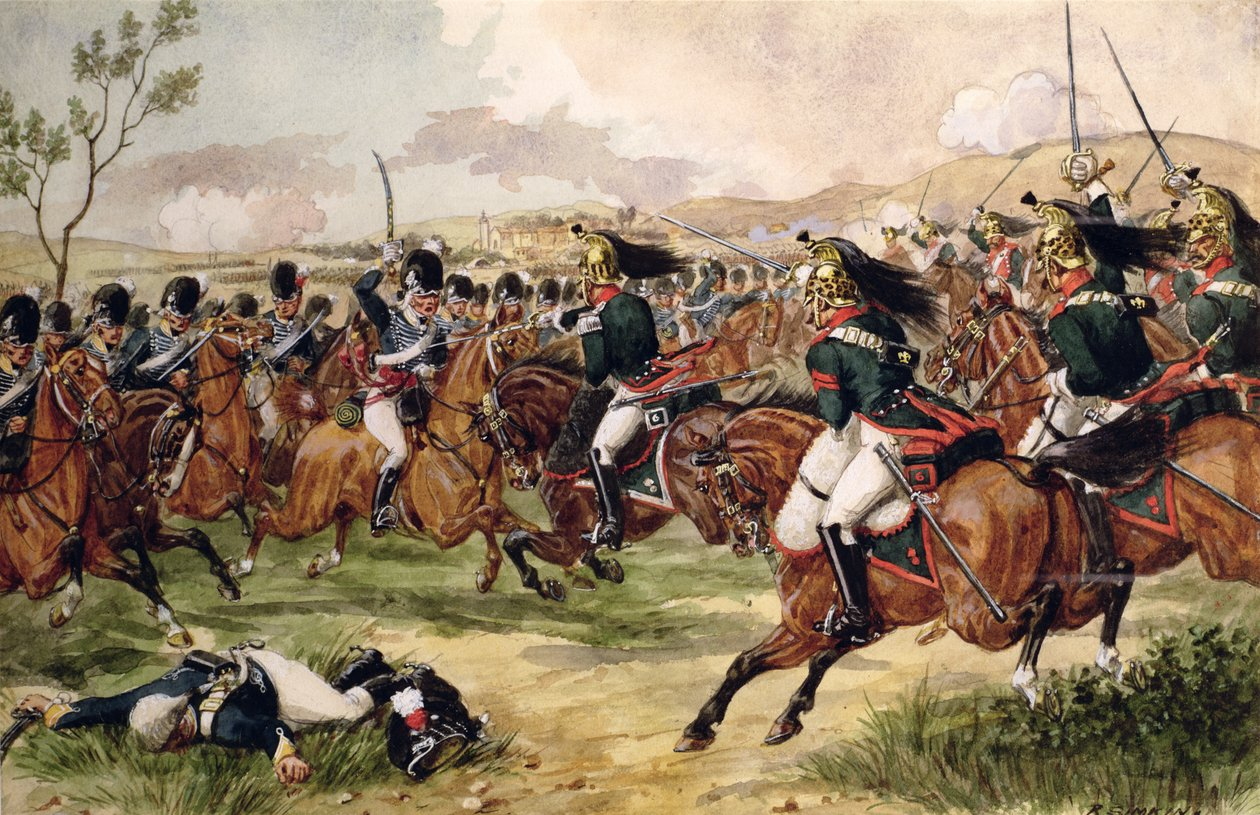
- The regiment (left) at the Battle of Vimeiro
- Active: 1792–1818
- Allegiance: Great Britain; United Kingdom
- Branch: British Army
- Type: Light cavalry
- Size: Regiment

The 20th Light Dragoons was a cavalry regiment of the British Army.

== History ==
The regiment was raised as the 20th (Jamaica) Regiment of (Light) Dragoons in 1792; it was deployed to Jamaica in 1795 during the Second Maroon War. The regiment saw action at the Battle of Blaauwberg in January 1806 during the second British invasion of the Dutch Cape Colony, and later at the Battle of Montevideo in February 1807 during the British invasions of the River Plate. The 3rd Squadron was the sole cavalry detachment present in the Alexandria expedition of 1807. It also fought at the Battle of Roliça and Battle of Vimeiro in August 1808 during the Peninsular War. In 1805 its title was simplified again to the 20th Regiment of (Light) Dragoons; it was disbanded in 1818.

== Sources ==
- Marley, David (1998). Wars of the Americas: A chronology of armed conflict in the New World 1492 to 1997. ABC-CLIO. ISBN 978-0874368376.
