= Robert Anstruther (British Army officer) =

Scottish general

Brigadier-General Robert Anstruther
- Born: 3 March 1768
- Died: 14 January 1809 (aged 40)
- Burial place: Corunna, Spain
- Education: Westminster School
- Relatives: Sir Robert Anstruther (father)
- Military career
- Allegiance: United Kingdom
- Branch: British Army
- Service years: 1785–1809
- Rank: Brigadier-General
- Unit: 3rd Foot Guards
- Conflicts: French Revolutionary Wars; Flanders Expedition (WIA); Anglo-Russian invasion of Holland; Egypt Campaign; Napoleonic Wars; Peninsular War; Battle of Vimeiro; Retreat to Corunna (DOW)

Brigadier-General Robert Anstruther (3 March 1768 – 14 January 1809), was a Scottish general who served during the French Revolutionary and Napoleonic Wars.

== Biography ==
=== Early career ===
Robert Anstruther was the eldest son of Sir Robert Anstruther, 3rd Baronet, and Lady Janet Erskine, daughter of the Earl of Kellie, and was born in 1768. He was educated at Westminster School, but early showed a taste for a military life, and in 1788 his father purchased for him a commission as an ensign, and in 1792 the rank of lieutenant and captain in the 3rd Regiment of Foot ( The Scots Guards). He led the usual life of a young officer in the Guards, but at the same time paid great attention to his military duties. He served with his regiment in the campaigns of 1793 and 1794 in Flanders, and in 1796 was for a short time attached to the Austrian headquarters, but, seeing no further chance of active service in the Guards, he purchased, in March 1797, a majority, and in August of the same year a lieutenant-colonelcy in the 68th Regiment, with which he served in the West Indies, where he attracted the attention of Sir Ralph Abercromby.

=== Campaigns in Holland and Egypt ===
In August 1799, hearing that the guards were going on active service, he exchanged into his old regiment as captain and lieutenant-colonel, and served with it in the Anglo-Russian invasion of Holland. In the same year he married Miss Lucy Charlotte Hamilton, the daughter of Colonel Hamilton, of the Coldstream Guards, eldest son of Lord Anne Hamilton and a nephew of the Duke of Hamilton. The next year, though only a lieutenant-colonel, he was selected by Sir Ralph Abercromby to be quartermaster-general of his army in the Mediterranean, at the same time that another young Scotsman, John Hope, who was also to gain fame in Moore's retreat, was nominated adjutant-general. Sir Ralph placed the greatest confidence in Anstruther, and it was mainly on his report, after a visit to the Turkish headquarters, that the Turks would not be ready for a long time, if they could be of any use at all, that Sir Ralph left Marmorice Bay and determined to act alone. Through the whole Egyptian campaign he served with the greatest credit, and was made one of the first knights of the Crescent when the Sultan established that order. On his return he was promoted colonel, was made first deputy quartermaster-general in England, and then adjutant-general in Ireland, and spent some years of domestic happiness at home. But he failed in his attempt to obtain active employment, until, on the return of the Tories to power in 1807, he was appointed brigadier-general, and ordered to take command of a brigade, consisting of the 20th and 52nd Regiments, and four companies of the 95th or Rifle Regiment, which was about to sail to the assistance of Sir Arthur Wellesley in Portugal.

=== Peninsular war ===
He embarked at Ramsgate in August 1808, and, on reaching the mouth of the Douro in company with Brigadier-General Acland, found orders from General Wellesley to proceed at once down the coast to Maceira Bay. Wellesley himself had, after his success at Roliça, marched along the coast, for he wished to receive reinforcements before he either attacked Lisbon or engaged Junot's whole army. At Paymayo and Maceira accordingly Anstruther and Acland met Wellesley and disembarked their brigades, though with much difficulty and loss from the heavy surf. When disembarked, Wellesley formed his whole army in a strong position at Vimeiro, and awaited the attack which Junot was meditating. At the battle of Vimeiro, the churchyard which formed the key of the English situation was occupied by the brigades of Fane and Anstruther, and on them fell the brunt of Junot's attack. The French were, however, repulsed with heavy loss, and Anstruther proved his ability as a brigadier. On the arrival of Moore, Burrard, and Dalrymple, the army was re-divided, and Anstruther had the other companies of the 95th given to him, and was put under the orders of Edward Paget, who was to command the reserve. On the advance into Spain, Paget led his brigades by way of Elvas and Alcantara, to join Moore at Salamanca.

It was in the retreat from Salamanca, or rather from Toro, that Anstruther's most important military duties were performed. The reserve was ordered to form the rear division, and Anstruther's brigade actually closed the retreat. The conduct of the troops was now severely tried, but the reserve stood the test well. While the leading divisions were perpetually in disorder, the reserve, of which both officers and men had been trained by Sir John Moore himself at Shorncliffe, maintained perfect discipline, and in Anstruther's brigade served two of the regiments, the 52nd and 95th, which were to form the nucleus of the famous Light Division under Wellington. As far as Lugo, the French were never a day's march behind, every day saw sharp skirmishes, and there were at least two smart engagements at Cacabelos on 3 June and Constantino on 5 June, in which the reserve and cavalry were alone concerned. General Anstruther proved himself a model officer, and Moore declared that to the conduct of the reserve, and of Paget and Anstruther in particular, the safe arrival of the army at Corunna was due. But the exertions of this trying time were too much for General Anstruther, and on 14 January, the day but one after he had led his brigade into Corunna, and the day but one before the battle, he died from fatigue and exhaustion. He was buried at Corunna, and when Moore was himself dying, he expressed a wish to be buried beside his gallant friend and companion, so that the column erected by Marshal Soult over Moore's remains marks also the grave of Robert Anstruther. He presents a singular instance of military devotion; with wealth, domestic happiness, and a certain seat in parliament, he preferred to risk his life and lose it in the service of his country.
