= James Catlin Craufurd =

British Army officer (1776–1810)

Brigadier-General James Catlin Craufurd
- Born: 23 January 1776
- Died: 25 September 1810 (aged 34); Abrantes, Portugal
- Military career
- Allegiance: United Kingdom
- Branch: British Army
- Rank: Brigadier-General
- Conflicts: War of the Third Coalition; Hanover Expedition; Peninsular War; Roliça; Vimeiro; Corunna; Bussaco
- Awards: Gold Medals: Roliça & Vimeiro; Corunna

James Catlin Craufurd (23 January 1776 – 25 September 1810) was a British Army officer who saw action as the commander of one of Sir Arthur Wellesley's brigades in Portugal at the Battle of Roliça (August 1808), the first battle fought by the British Army during the Peninsular War. (Note: Not to be confused with Lt Col Henry Craufurd, who also fought at Roliça and Vimeiro and was killed at St Sebastian, nor with Ronald Craufurd Ferguson, who also led a brigade at Roliça, nor with Maj Gen Robert Craufurd, famous commander of the Light Division, who also served under Wellington during the Peninsular War and was killed at Ciudad Rodrigo (Nicolas, 1842).)

== Career ==
In 1791, James Catlin Craufurd, then living in New York City, purchased a commission as an ensign in the 24th Foot, stationed in Canada. In October 1793 he became a captain in the 30th Foot, stationed in the Mediterranean. In 1796 he was appointed a major in the 98th Regiment of Foot and, the following year, at the age of 21, he purchased his lieutenant-colonelcy of the regiment, under Duncan Campbell, and went with his regiment to the Cape Colony, where he served as aide-de-camp to the governor, George Macartney, 1st Earl Macartney.

In 1803, the regiment returned to Britain and was stationed at Lewes where, in October 1805, Craufurd was promoted to colonel, in the same promotion as William Anson, Robert Craufurd and John Le Marchant, among others. Later that year, the regiment formed part of the expeditionary force sent to Hanover and then shortly afterwards, to Ireland, before embarking for Portugal in June 1808.

=== Peninsular War ===
After having served under Wellesley at Roliça (August 1808) and, a few days later, at Vimeiro, Craufurd went on to serve under Sir John Moore at Corunna (January 1809), where he led the 3rd Brigade of John Hope's 2nd Division. He was promoted to brigadier general in July 1809, together with Robert Craufurd.

At Bussaco (September 1810), Craufurd led the 3rd Brigade of Maj Gen Rowland Hill's 2nd Division.

== Death ==
In September 1809, Craufurd's brigade was tasked with guarding the right flank of the British Army along the Guadiana River, an area of marshy ground that gave its name to a form of malaria. A year later, the brigade had lost a quarter of its force due to the disease, and General Craufurd died of it on 25 September 1810.

== Family ==
James Catlin Craufurd was the illegitimate son of James Craufurd, equerry to Queen Charlotte (1766–94) and governor of Bermuda (1794–6), of the Craufurds of Auchinames, County of Ayr. He considered his father's brother, John "Fish" Craufurd, an influential member of Parliament, his guardian, and it was he who took charge of James Catlin Craufurd's family following the latter's death in Portugal.

While in South Africa, James Catlin Craufurd had married Anne Elizabeth Barnard in 1799. The couple had four daughters and two sons. In 1828, one of his daughters, Isabella Letitia, married Henry William Barnard.
