= Nicholas Trant =

Nicholas Trant (1769-1839) was a British Army officer of Irish descent who led Portuguese irregular troops in several actions during the Peninsular War. His best known exploits were the recapture of Coimbra from the French in October 1810 and the successful defense of the line of the Mondego River in March 1811.

== Early career ==
Trant was born into an Irish family of Danish origin. He entered the British army in May 1794, as a lieutenant of the 84th Foot. In 1799 he held the rank of major in the Minorcan Regiment, and he subsequently entered the Royal Staff Corps in 1803, as an ensign.

== Peninsular War ==
While a captain in the Royal Staff Corps, Trant was assigned to the army of the Kingdom of Portugal where he became a brigadier general. While in the Portuguese service, he commanded a 2,000-man contingent at the Battle of Vimeiro.

Shortly before the Battle of Bussaco on 27 September 1810, Trant's Portuguese militia ambushed the French Army's baggage train and it barely escaped capture. Soon, Marshal André Masséna's army captured Coimbra and established a base there. On 7 October Trant and 4,000 Portuguese militia recaptured the city. French losses were 8 killed and 400 able-bodied soldiers captured. About 3,500 sick and wounded, plus several hundred medical and service personnel also surrendered. Trant lost only 3 killed and 26 wounded. As governor, he remained in possession of the place all winter while the French carried out their futile blockade of the Lines of Torres Vedras.

Trant's finest achievement occurred after Masséna ordered a retreat. The French marshal intended to retreat north across the Mondego River into an area of Portugal where his troops could forage for food and supplies. Defending the line of the Mondego with only 5,000 militia and no regular troops, Trant carried out a brilliant bluff starting on 10 March 1811. On 13 March, Masséna, pressed from behind by Arthur Wellesley, 1st Duke of Wellington's Anglo-Portuguese army, reluctantly directed his retreating columns toward the east and the Spanish frontier.

On 14 April 1812, in the Battle of Guarda, Trant with 2,000 militia and a handful of cavalry unwisely tried to stop three of Marshal Auguste Marmont's divisions from raiding into Portugal. The 13th Horse Chasseurs Regiment charged and rode down his force, capturing 1,500 men. Most of the prisoners were later released.

Wellington wrote critically of Trant, "a very good officer, but a drunken dog as ever lived."

== Personal life ==
With his wife, Sarah (née Horsington, of an evangelical family), Trant had two children: Captain Thomas Abercrombie Trant (1805-1832), of the 28th Foot, and the diarist Clarissa Sandford Trant (1800-1844), who married John Bramston, Dean of Winchester from 1872 to 1883. Her granddaughter, Clara Georgina Luard, edited the twenty-eight volumes of her diary, publishing the volume in 1925.
