= Wroth Palmer Acland =

British Army general

Lieutenant-General Sir Wroth Palmer Acland KCB
- Born: 16 March 1770
- Died: 8 March 1816 (aged 45); Bath, England
- Other names: Surname: Ackland, Acklin; Forename: Wrothe, William
- Military career
- Allegiance: United Kingdom
- Branch: British Army
- Service years: 1787–1816
- Rank: Lieutenant-General
- Commands: 19th Regiment of Foot; 2nd Brigade, Maida; Brigade, Peninsular; Brigade, 2nd Division; Brigade, Walcheren
- Conflicts: French Revolutionary Wars; West Indies campaign; Flanders campaign; Napoleonic Wars; Anglo-Russian occupation of Naples; Invasion of Naples; Battle of Maida; Peninsular War; Battle of Vimeiro; Walcheren Expedition; Siege of Flushing
- Awards: Army Gold Medal with clasp

Lieutenant-General Sir Wroth Palmer Acland KCB (16 March 1770 – 8 March 1816) was an English soldier, notable for his role in the Peninsular War.

== Biography ==
Acland was the 12th child of Arthur Palmer Acland, of Fairfield House, Somerset, and Elizabeth Oxenham. He was the nephew of Sir Thomas Acland, Bart., and entered the army in 1787 as ensign in the 17th regiment. He became lieutenant by purchase on 10 July 1790, and captain in 1791, and was then placed on half pay. On the breaking out of the war with France all officers were required for active service, and Captain Acland exchanged into the 3rd regiment or Buffs on 9 March 1793. He served in Flanders under the Duke of York, and in on 21 March 1795 purchased a majority in the 19th Regiment of Foot, and later the lieutenant-colonelcy.

In 1796 he accompanied his regiment to Ceylon, and in 1799 became by exchange captain and lieutenant-colonel in the 2nd or Coldstream guards, with which he served in Egypt. He became colonel in 1803, and, after serving at the Battle of Maida, was appointed brigadier-general, and ordered to take command of a brigade fitting out at Harwich for Portugal in 1808. His brigade sailed in company with one under Brigadier-General Anstruther in May, and on reaching the Douro found orders from Sir Arthur Wellesley to proceed to Maceira Bay. Here Wellesley covered the dangerous disembarkation of Acland's brigade, and then drew up the two brigades with the rest of his army in a strong position at Vimeiro. Acland's brigade was posted on the left of the churchyard, which formed the key of the English position, and which would have been a post of much danger if Sir Arthur Wellesley had not perceived Junot's plan of turning the English left, and sent the brigades on his own right to take position on Acland's left. As it was, Acland by a flank fire helped Anstruther to drive down the main French attacking column, which was his chief important service. Ill-health made it necessary for him to leave Portugal soon after the battle, and deprived him of the glory of serving, like Anstruther, under Sir John Moore.

In 1810 he was promoted major-general, and commanded a division in the expedition to the Scheldt, where, however, little glory was to be won. In 1814 he was promoted lieutenant-general, and on the extension of the Order of the Bath made one of the first Knights Commander (KCB). In 1815 he was made colonel of the first battalion of the 60th Regiment, and on 8 March 1816, he died from the recurrence of the fever which had threatened his life in Portugal.
