= Battle of Vimeiro =

1808 Battle during the Peninsular War

- Part of the Peninsular War
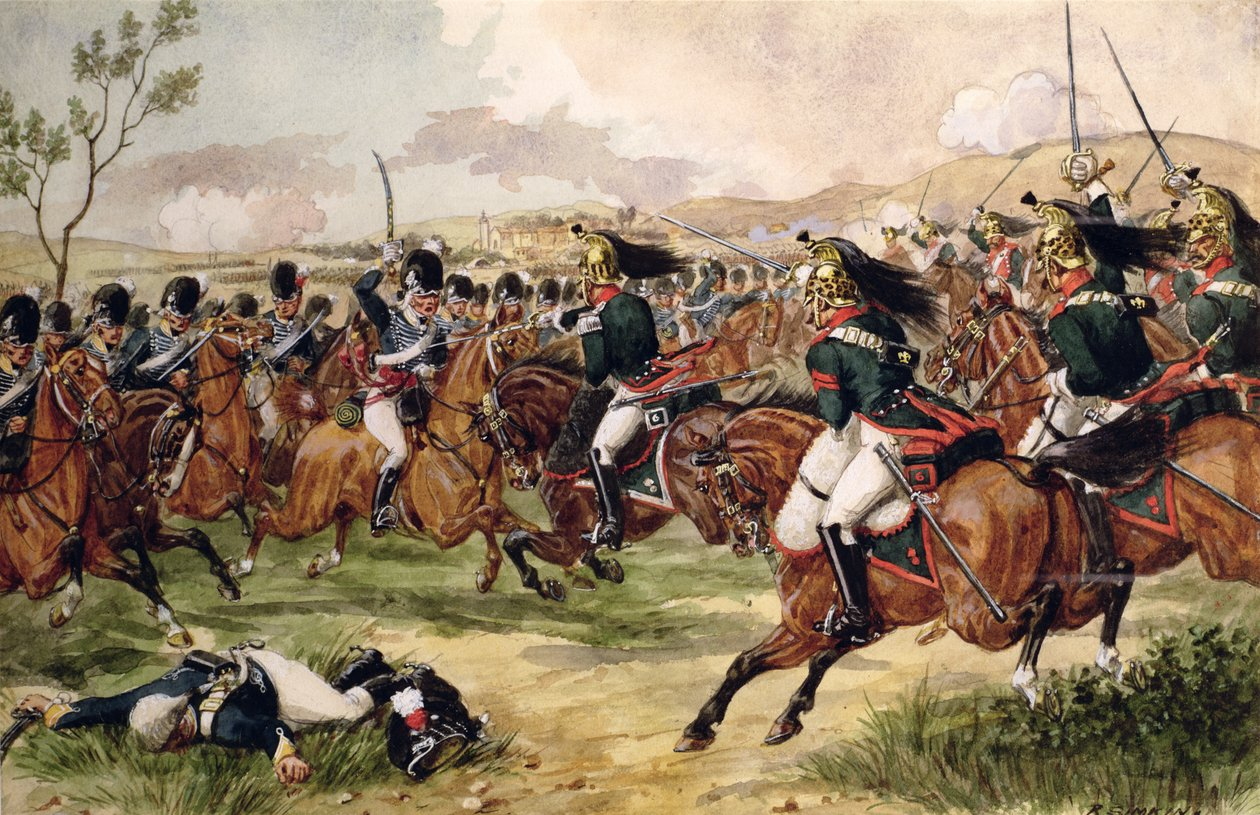
- The 20th Light Dragoons charging at French dragoons during the battle
Date	21 August 1808
Location	Near Vimeiro, Portugal 39°10′34″N 9°18′57″W
Result	Anglo-Portuguese victory: Convention of Cintra

Belligerents
First French Empire	(United Kingdom of Great Britain and Ireland) United Kingdom; Portugal

Commanders and leaders
(First French Empire) Jean-Andoche Junot	(United Kingdom of Great Britain and Ireland) Arthur Wellesley

Strength
13,000–14,000; 23–24 guns	17,000–20,500; 18–19 guns

Casualties and losses
370–450 killed 1,630–1,710 wounded 13 guns lost	135 killed 593 wounded 51 missing

Peninsular war: Portugal
1807 1808 1809 1810 1811

In the Battle of Vimeiro (sometimes shown as "Vimiera" or "Vimeira" in contemporary British texts) on 21 August 1808, the British under General Arthur Wellesley (who later became the Duke of Wellington) defeated the French under Major-General Jean-Andoche Junot near the village of Vimeiro (Portuguese pronunciation: [viˈmɐjɾu]), near Lisbon, Portugal, during the Peninsular War. This battle put an end to the first French invasion of Portugal.

Four days after the Battle of Roliça, Wellesley's army was attacked by a French army under General Junot near the village of Vimeiro. The battle began as a battle of manoeuvre, with French troops attempting to outflank the British left, but Wellesley was able to redeploy his army to face the assault. Meanwhile, Junot sent in two central columns but these were forced back by sustained volleys from troops in line. Soon afterwards, the flanking attack was beaten off and Junot retreated towards Torres Vedras, having lost 2,000 men and 13 cannon, compared to 700 Anglo-Portuguese losses. No pursuit was attempted because Wellesley was superseded by Sir Harry Burrard and then Sir Hew Dalrymple (one having arrived during the battle, the second soon after).

== Background ==
The British intervention started with the Battle of Roliça.

== Prelude ==
After Roliça, Wellesley had established a position near Vimeiro. By holding the village, plus some ridges to the west, the British commander covered a beachhead at Maceira Bay a little further to the west. Since most of his reinforcements had arrived by 20 August, Wellesley planned to advance south on Lisbon. Eight independent infantry brigades under Rowland Hill, Ronald Craufurd Ferguson, Miles Nightingall, Barnard Foord Bowes, Catlin Craufurd, Henry Fane, Robert Anstruther and Wroth Acland formed the core of Wellesley's forces. Rounding out his force were 17 cannons, 240 light cavalry led by C. D. Taylor and about 2,000 Portuguese troops under Nicholas Trant, giving a total of 20,000 men.

Junot organised his 14,000-man force into two infantry divisions and a cavalry division under Pierre Margaron. Henri François Delaborde's infantry division contained two brigades under Antoine François Brenier and Jean Guillaume Barthélemy Thomières, while Louis Henri Loison's division included two brigades commanded by Jean-Baptiste Solignac and Hugues Charlot. In addition, François Étienne de Kellermann commanded a 2,100-man reserve made up of four converged grenadier battalions. These units were created by taking the grenadier company from each of Junot's infantry battalions. The French took 23 cannons into battle with them.

Wellesley placed Anstruther's and Fane's brigades in front of Vimeiro, with Acland's men in support. At first, his five remaining brigades held only the western ridge. Junot planned to send Thomières, Solignac and Charlot's infantry brigades to capture Vimeiro, while Brenier's 4,300-man brigade and some dragoons swung in a wide flanking manoeuvre to seize an empty ridge to the northeast of the village. Wellesley detected Brenier's move and switched Nightingall, Ferguson and Bowes to the northeastern ridge. Once Junot realised that British troops occupied the ridge, he sent Solignac's brigade to the right to assist Brenier's attack. The French commander decided to launch his attack on the town immediately, instead of waiting for his flanking move to develop.

== Battle ==
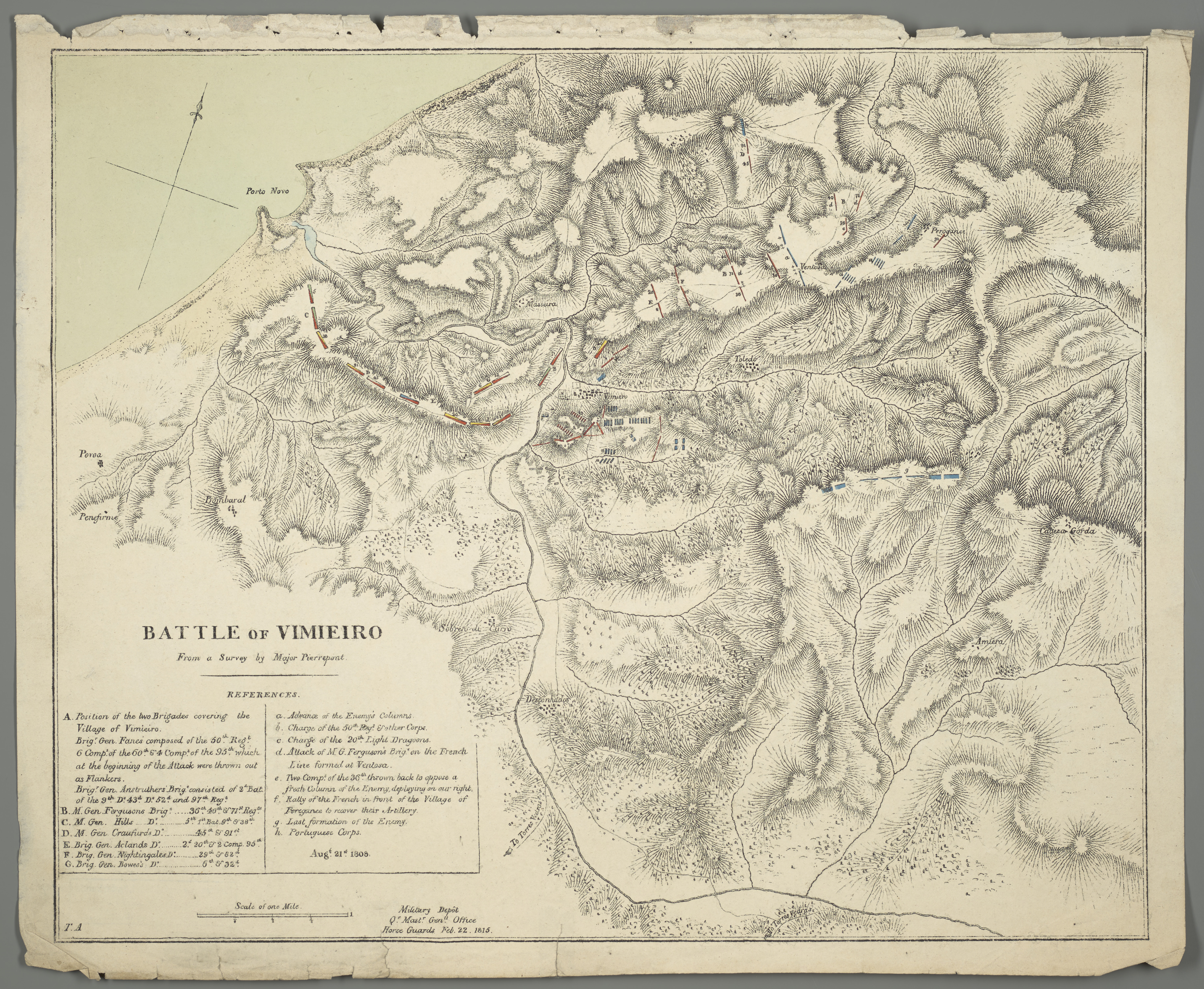
Topographical map of the battle

All the preliminary moves and countermoves caused a series of uncoordinated French attacks. First, Thomières' 2,100-man brigade approached the British position. Supported by three cannons and screened by skirmishers, the brigade was formed into a column of companies.

The first company of 120 men formed in a three-deep line would have a front rank 40 men wide. All the other companies formed behind the first company, making the entire brigade about 40 files wide and 48 ranks deep. According to French doctrine, as soon as the enemy main position was found, the companies would peel off to the right or left to form a firing line many companies wide and only three files deep. On the other hand, French commanders often pressed home attacks while in column, depending entirely upon their skirmishers and artillery to provide the necessary fire support.

To counter the French skirmishers, Fane detached four companies of riflemen (60th Regiment of Foot & 95th Rifles). These outnumbered and outfought the French skirmishers, who fell back to the sides of the brigade column. Without their skirmishers in front of them, the French column blundered into the 945 men of the 50th Regiment. At 100 yards (91 m), the British, formed into a two-deep line, opened fire. Several companies of the 50th began wheeling inward toward both flanks of the hapless French column. Unable to properly deploy into firing line and unwilling to face the deadly enfilade fire, the French infantry suddenly bolted to the rear, leaving their three cannons to be captured.

Soon after, a similar fate overtook Charlot's brigade. In a very narrow column, it struck one battalion of Anstruther's brigade, which had been hidden behind a crest. Before they could deploy, the French were taken in flank by a second battalion. Unable to effectively reply to the devastating British volley fire, Charlot's men soon ran away. Seeing the battle going against him, Junot committed his grenadier reserve to the attack. The first two battalions attacked the same area as the previous units and were thrown back. Kellermann swung the final two grenadier battalions wide to the right and succeeded in breaking into Vimeiro. But, counterattacked by units from Anstruther and Acland, these Frenchmen also fell back. Colonel Taylor's 20th Light Dragoons pounced on Kellermann's retreating grenadiers and routed them. Excited by their easy success, the British horsemen charged out of control. They soon came up against Margaron's French cavalry division and were routed in their turn. Taylor was killed and the British horsemen lost about one man in four. As Brenier's men had been delayed by taking a longer road to circumvent the narrow ravines, Solignac attacked the northeast ridge. This brigade changed tactics deploying in an attack formation with three battalions abreast. Even so, each battalion formed a column one company wide and eight companies deep. If the French intended to form into line once the enemy position was detected, they waited too long. They marched into the volley fire of Nightingall and Ferguson's brigades before they could deploy. Smashed by British volleys, Solignac's men fled.

Brenier's brigade, marching to the sound of battle, came on four battalions abreast. At first they enjoyed success when they surprised and drove back two British battalions. These units had let down their guard after overpowering Solignac. Victorious, the French pressed on in column, but soon ran into the 29th Regiment in line and were stopped. The 29th was joined by the other two units, who had quickly rallied. Together, the volley fire of the three British battalions soon routed Brenier's men. Though Wellesley urged him to pursue, Burrard declined to interfere with the subsequent French retreat. General Brenier was wounded in this attack and captured by the 71st Highlanders.

== Aftermath ==
The British intervention proceeded with the Evacuation of La Romana's division.

=== Vimeiro ===
After the French defeat, Dalrymple gave the French more generous terms than they could have hoped for. Under the terms of the Convention of Cintra, the defeated army was transported back to France by the British navy, complete with its loot, guns and equipment. The convention caused an outcry in Britain. An official enquiry exonerated all three men but both the military establishment and public opinion blamed Dalrymple and Burrard. Both men were given administrative posts and neither had a field command again. Wellesley, who had bitterly opposed the agreement, was returned to active command in Spain and Portugal.

== See also ==
- Timeline of the Peninsular War

== Bibliography ==
- Bodart, Gaston (1908). Militär-historisches Kriegs-Lexikon (1618–1905).
- Burnham, Robert (2019). "The Battle of Vimeiro, Portugal: 21 August 1808". Archived from the original on 22 December 2019.
- Burnham, Robert; McGuigan, Ron (2010). The British Army against Napoleon. Barnsley, South Yorkshire: Frontline Books. ISBN 978-1-84832-562-3.
- Cribb, Marcus (2020). "The Battle of Vimeiro 21 August 1808". Archived from the original on 20 January 2021.
- Esdaile, Charles J. (2003). The Peninsular War. Palgrave MacMillan. ISBN 9781403962317.
- Fletcher, Ian (2006). Gregory Fremont-Barnes (ed.). The Encyclopedia of the French Revolutionary and Napoleonic Wars. Santa Barbara: ABC-CLIO.
- Southey, Robert (1828b). History of the Peninsular War. Vol. II (New, in 6 volumes ed.). London: John Murray.
- Weigley, Russell F. (2004). The Age of Battles: The Quest for Decisive Warfare from Breitenfeld to Waterloo. Bloomington: Indiana University Press. ISBN 0-253-21707-5.

Preceded by Battle of Roliça	Napoleonic Wars; Battle of Vimeiro	Succeeded by Battle of Zornoza
