= Vimeiro =

- Civil parish
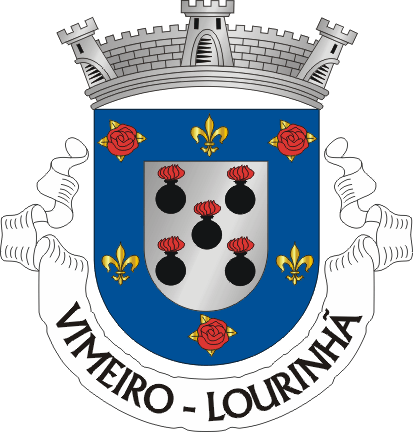
- Coat of arms

- Location in Portugal
- Coordinates: 39.178°N 9.318°W
- Country: Portugal
- Region: Oeste e Vale do Tejo
- Intermunic. comm.: Oeste
- District: Lisbon
- Municipality: Lourinhã

Area
  - Total: 7.08 km^{2} (2.73 sq mi)

Population (2011)
  - Total: 1,470
  - Density: 210/km^{2} (540/sq mi)
- Time zone: UTC+00:00 (WET)
  - Summer (DST): UTC+01:00 (WEST)

Vimeiro (Portuguese pronunciation: [viˈmɐjɾu]) is a freguesia (civil parish) in the municipality of Lourinhã in west-central Portugal. It is in the District of Lisboa. The population in 2011 was 1,470, in an area of 7.08 km².

Vimeiro was the site of the 1808 Battle of Vimeiro, where British forces under the Duke of Wellington defeated the French, ending the first French invasion of Portugal. A monument was dedicated in Vimeiro on August 21, 1908, the 100th anniversary of the battle, by Manuel II of Portugal.
