= Ronald Craufurd Ferguson =

Scottish officer in the British Army

General Sir Ronald Craufurd Ferguson GCB
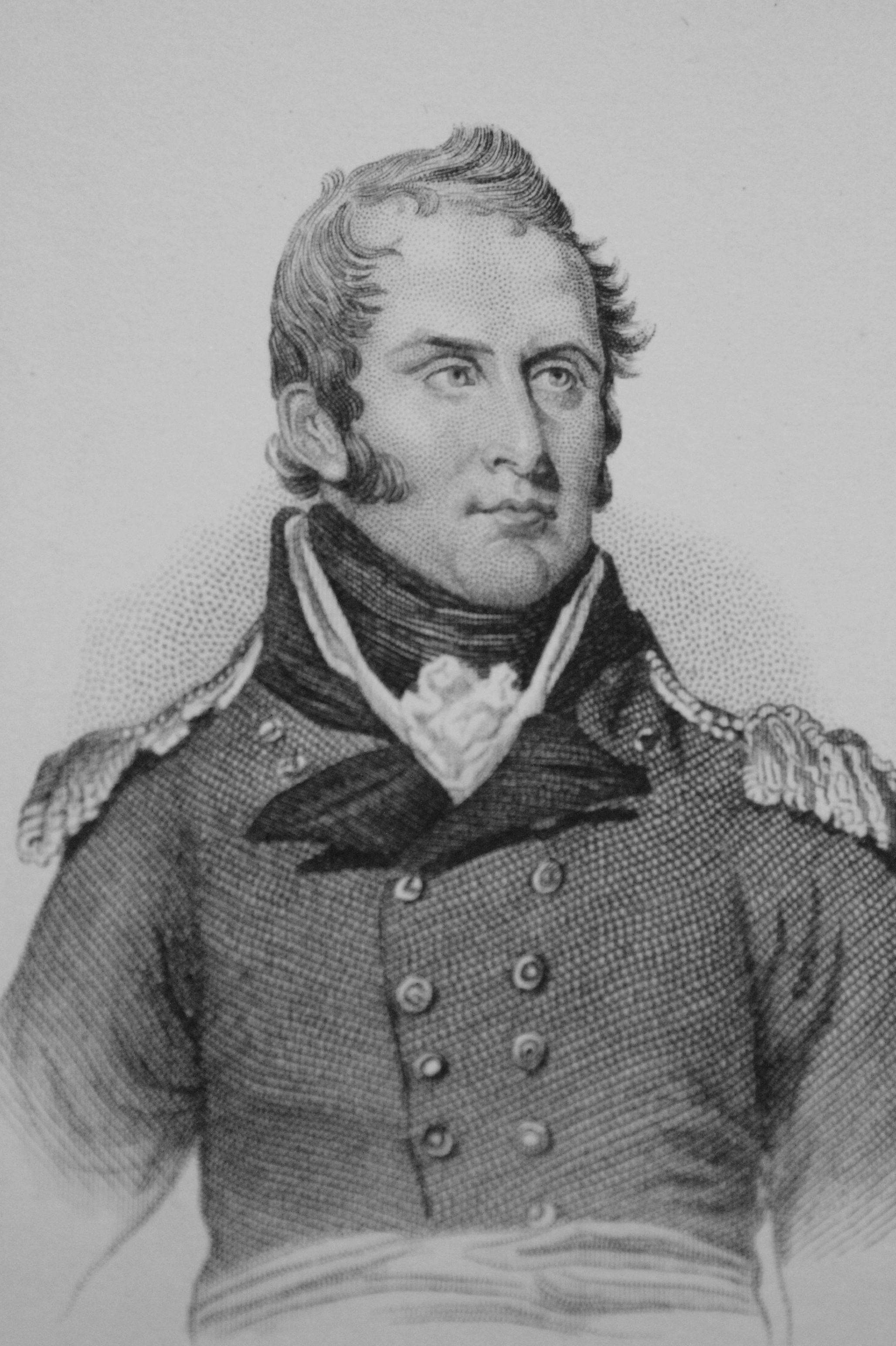

Personal details
- Born: 8 February 1773 Muirtown, Fife, Scotland
- Died: 10 March 1841 (aged 68) 5 Bolton Row, London, England
- Occupation: Soldier, politician
- Known for: Generalship

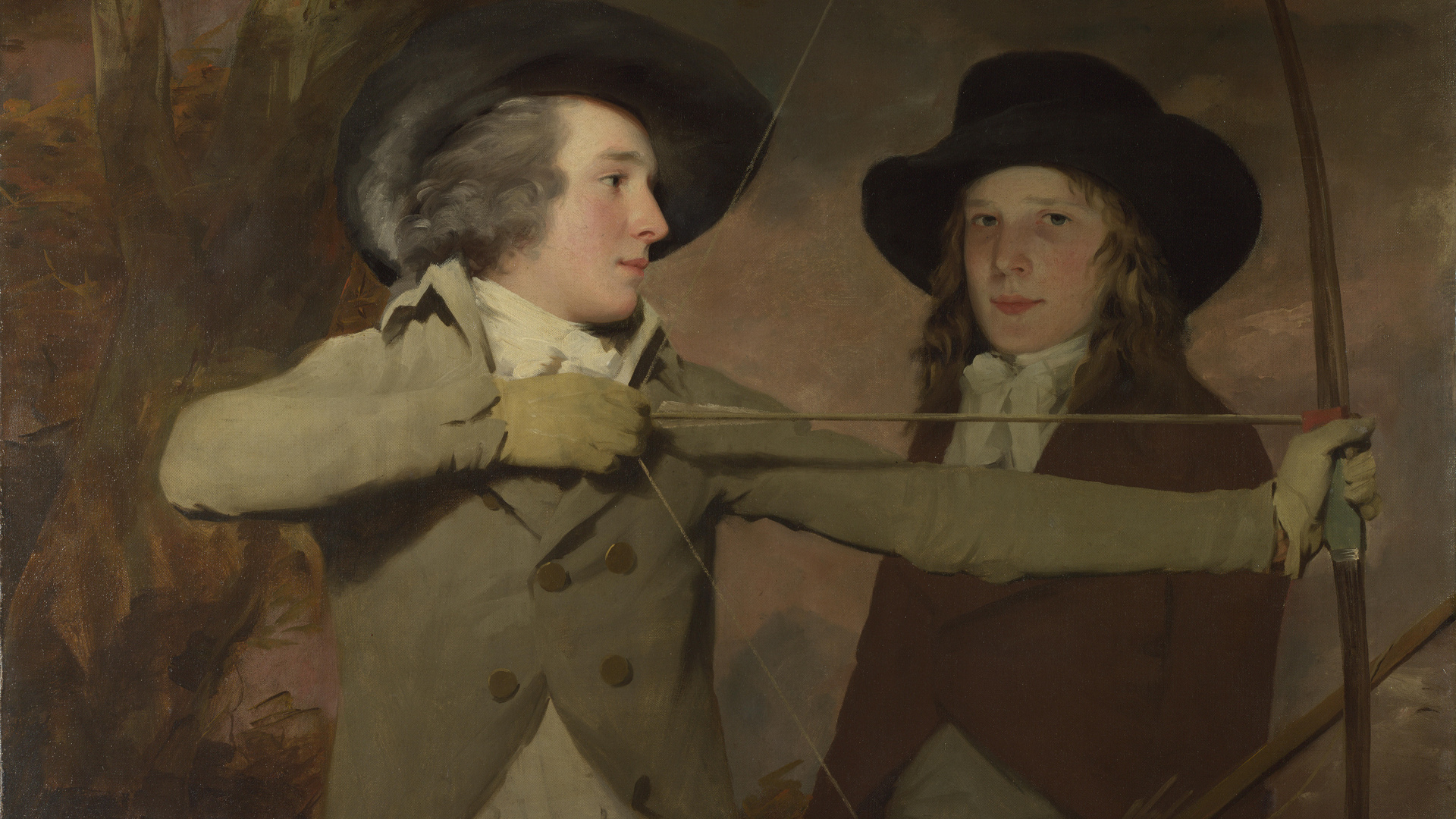
Ronald (right) as painted by Sir Henry Raeburn in "The Archers"

Sir Ronald Craufurd Ferguson GCB (8 February 1773 – 10 April 1841), was a Scottish officer in the British Army and a Member of Parliament for the constituencies of Dysart Burghs and for Nottingham.

== Biography ==
Ronald was second son of William Ferguson Esq., of Raith, Fife, by Jane, daughter of Ronald Craufurd of Restalrig, sister of Margaret, countess of Dumfries, was born in Edinburgh on 8 February 1773. He was brother and heir presumptive to his brother the MP for Kirkcaldy.

Ferguson entered the British Army as an ensign in the 53rd Regiment of Foot on 3 April 1790, and was promoted lieutenant on 24 January 1791. He then paid a long visit to Berlin in order to study the Prussian system of discipline, and on his return he was promoted captain on 19 February 1793.

In this year, on the outbreak of the French Revolutionary Wars, Ferguson's regiment, was despatched to Flanders, where it was brigaded with the 14th and 37th regiments under the command of Major-general Ralph Abercromby, who took particular notice of Ferguson, as a young Scot of singular bodily strength and activity. Ferguson served throughout the campaign of 1793, at the siege of Valenciennes, and in the battles which led to the Frederick, Duke of York's retreat from Dunkirk. In October 1793 the 53rd formed part of the garrison of Nieuwpoort, under the command of Lieutenant-general Sir Charles Grey, and during the constant fighting which took place in front of that town the 53rd was much engaged. Ferguson, who was wounded in the knee, was specially praised in despatches.

In the following year Ferguson left Flanders on being promoted major into the 84th Regiment of Foot on 31 May 1794, and on 18 September 1794, though only twenty-one, he was promoted lieutenant-colonel and appointed to command the newly raised 2nd battalion of that regiment. He was at once ordered to India, and in 1795 his regiment was one of those which co-operated from India, under Major-general Sir Alured Clarke, in the reduction of the Cape of Good Hope.

On his return to India Ferguson was stationed at Cawnpore, and there married Jean, natural daughter of General Sir Hector Munro, in 1798. This marriage greatly increased his wealth and importance, and Ferguson found no difficulty in getting further employment.

On his return to England he was promoted colonel on 1 January 1800, and in that year he held a command in Major-general the Hon. Thomas Maitland's attack on Belle Isle, and in Sir James Pulteney's Ferrol Expedition. He was one of the officers who returned home in disgust at Pulteney's refusal to attack Ferrol.

In 1804 Ferguson was appointed brigadier-general commanding the York district, and in the following year he took command of the highland brigade, consisting of the 71st, 72nd, and 93rd highlanders, in the expedition sent under Sir David Baird to recapturethe Cape of Good Hope. He performed the difficult task of landing his brigade in the face of the Dutch troops and covering the disembarkation of the rest of the army, and by his conduct in the following engagements he won the repeated thanks of Sir David Baird. He was forced to leave the Cape by severe illness. On his return to England he was elected M.P. for the Dysart burghs in 1806, a seat which he held for twenty-four years.

On 25 April 1808 he was promoted major-general and later the same year he was appointed to command a brigade in the army under Sir Arthur Wellesley, destined for the assistance of the Portuguese, and at the landing of the expedition at the mouth of the Mondego he was placed in command of a brigade consisting of the 42nd and 78th regiments.

At the battle of Roliça Ferguson's brigade was employed upon the extreme left, and twice turned Laborde's right, after an advance along a difficult mountain road. At the great battle of Vimeiro it was posted on the left of the English army, and Ferguson had just begun to pursue Junot when he was checked by Sir Harry Burrard. Ferguson was spoken of in the highest terms in Sir Arthur Wellesley's despatch, and was thanked in his place in the House of Commons for his services. He also received a gold medal and was gazetted colonel of the Sicilian regiment on 25 January 1809.

In the parliamentary session of 1809 he distinguished himself by his speeches against the Frederick, Duke of York in the debates on the Clarke scandal. In spite of this, and of his advanced liberalism, he was nominated to a command in the force sent under Sir David Baird to join Sir John Moore in the Peninsula, but reached Corunna too late to be of any service.

In 1810 he was appointed second in command to the army in Cádiz, but was obliged by illness to return to England in a few months. On 4 June 1813 he was promoted lieutenant-general. In 1814 he acted for a short time as second in command to Sir Thomas Graham in Holland, and in the following year he was made a Knight Commander of the Order of the Bath.

Ferguson never again saw service, but continued to sit for the Dysart Burghs until 1830, and throughout this period of Tory ascendancy, he sought a dilution of the power of the prelates: distinguished himself in the House of Commons by his decided liberalism. He was a consistent supporter of all measures tending to civil and religious liberty, an earnest advocate for Catholic emancipation, and both spoke and voted for the ballot and for triennial parliaments. He also called for a revision of income tax, and encouraged elementary schooling.

On 24 March 1828 he was transferred to the colonelcy of the 79th Cameron highlanders, on 22 July 1830 he was promoted general, and in 1831 he was made a Knight Grand Cross of the Most Honourable Order of the Bath at the coronation of William IV.

He was a member of the liberal clubs, the Athenaeum, and Reform Club. In 1830 he was defeated for the representation of the Dysart burghs by the Tory candidate, Lord Loughborough, the eldest son of General the Earl of Rosslyn; but he was immediately elected for Nottingham, for which place he continued to sit until his death, at 5 Bolton Row, London, on 10 March 1841. In the previous December he had succeeded to the family estate of Raith, on the death of his elder brother, Robert Ferguson, who had also for many years been a radical M.P., and he was succeeded in all his Scottish estates by his only son, Colonel Robert Ferguson(1802–1868), who sat for the Kirkcaldy Burghs from 1841 to 1862, and took the additional name of Munro on acceding to some of the estates of his grandfather, Sir Hector Munro, 8th Laird of Novar.

== Notes ==
Parliament of the United Kingdom
Preceded by Sir Robert Dallas	Member of Parliament for Dysart Burghs; 1806–1830	Succeeded by Lord Loughborough
Preceded by Joseph Birch; The Lord Rancliffe	Member of Parliament for Nottingham; 1830–1841; With: Thomas Denman to 1832; Viscount Duncannon 1832–1834; Sir John Cam Hobhouse, Bt from 1834	Succeeded by Sir John Cam Hobhouse, Bt; John Walter
