= Alexander Cameron (British Army officer, born 1781) =

British Army general (1781–1850)

General Sir Alexander Cameron KCB
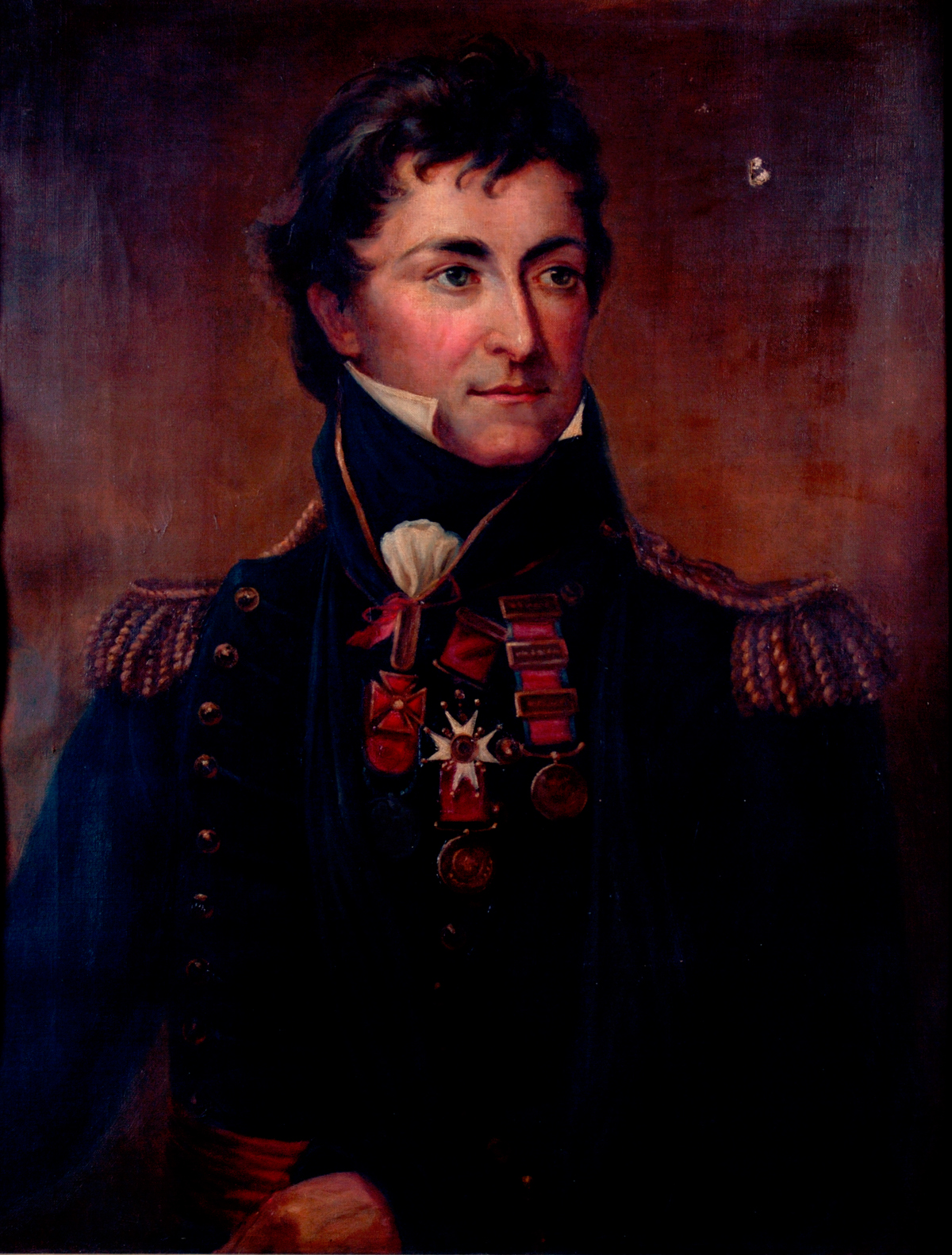
- Born: 1781; Inverailort, Scotland
- Died: 26 July 1850 (aged 68 or 69); Inverailort, Scotland
- Military career
- Allegiance: United Kingdom
- Branch: British Army
- Service years: 1797–1850
- Rank: General
- Commands: 1st Battalion, 95th Regiment of Foot (Rifles)
- Conflicts: Napoleonic Wars
- Awards: Mentioned in Despatches; Army Gold Medal; Knight Commander of the Order of the Bath; Order of St Anne

General Sir Alexander Cameron KCB (1781–26 July 1850) was a Scottish general officer of the British Army, known for his service in the Rifle Brigade.

== Biography ==
Cameron was a younger son of Alexander Cameron of Inverailort, Argyllshire, and was born there in 1781. On 22 October 1797 he received a commission as ensign in the Breadalbane Fencibles, and in 1799 he volunteered to serve with the 92nd Highlanders in the Anglo-Russian invasion of Holland, and received an ensigncy in that regiment.

In 1800, when the Rifle Brigade, then known as the 95th Regiment, was raised, Cameron volunteered, and was promoted lieutenant in it on 6 September 1800. In the same year he was present at the Battle of Copenhagen, and in 1801 he volunteered to serve with his former regiment, the 92nd Highlanders, in Egypt, and was severely wounded in the arm and side in the battle of 13 March. He then returned to England, and rejoined the Rifles, and was trained with the other officers in the Shorncliffe Army Camp by Sir John Moore, who secured his promotion to the rank of captain on 6 May 1800.

He served with his battalion in Lord Cathcart's expedition to Hanover in 1805, and in the Battle of Copenhagen, and was present at the action of Kioge. In 1808 he was ordered to Portugal with Anstruther's brigade, and was present at the Battle of Vimeiro. During the retreat of Sir John Moore he was continually engaged with the rest of the reserve in covering the retreat. He especially distinguished himself at the affair of Cacabelos and the Battle of Corunna, at both of which he commanded two companies of his battalion. In May 1809 he was again ordered to Portugal, and on reaching Lisbon his battalion was brigaded, with the 43rd and 52nd Regiments, into the celebrated Light Brigade, under the command of Robert Craufurd, which made its famous forced march in July, and joined the main army the day after the Battle of Talavera.

From January to June 1810 Craufurd's advanced position on the Coa was one of extreme danger, and Cameron distinguished himself in many emergencies, and in the action, 24 June 1810, held the bridge with two companies against the French army until Major Macleod of the 43rd came to his assistance. In the retreat on Busaco he commanded the rear companies of the Light Brigade, which covered the retreat. He commanded the outposts during the time when Masséna remained at Santarem, and in the pursuit after that marshal succeeded to the command of the left wing of the rifles, after the fall of Major Stuart at Foz d'Aronce, and twice led it into action at Casal Nova and at Sabugal. The Light Brigade had during the occupation of the lines of Torres Vedras become the Light Division by the addition of two regiments of Portuguese caçadores, and as a wing of the rifles was attached to each brigade, Cameron's command was of proportionate importance, and he was specially recommended by Lord Wellington for the brevet rank of major, to which he was gazetted on 30 May 1811.

During the Siege of Almeida and at the Battle of Fuentes de Onoro he commanded a detachment of two hundred picked sharpshooters and half a troop of horse artillery, with the special duty of preventing supplies from entering the place, and during the Siege of Ciudad Rodrigo he commanded the left wing of the rifles at the outposts and the covering party during the storm on 18 January 1812. At the siege of Badajoz he was specially thanked in general orders, with Colonel Williams of the 60th, for repulsing a sortie, and on the night of the assault he again commanded the covering party.

On the death of Major O'Hare he succeeded to the command of the battalion, and led it into the city. He received a brevet lieutenant-colonelcy and the vacant regimental majority on 27 April and 14 May 1812. He then succeeded to the command of the 1st Battalion, which was again united, on the 2nd Battalion rifles joining the division, and kept it in such perfect condition that it became a model to Wellington's whole army. This battalion he commanded at the Battle of Salamanca, and in the advance to Madrid, and with it covered Hill's retreat along the left bank of the Tagus. He had the mortification of being superseded in his command of the battalion by the arrival of Lieutenant-Colonel Norcott in May 1813, and so was only present at the Battle of Vittoria as a regimental major, where he was so severely wounded that he had to return to England.

Towards the close of 1813 he was selected for the command of a provisional battalion of rifles, which was sent to Flanders to serve in Sir Thomas Graham's expedition, and he commanded it at Merxem, when he was thanked in the general orders and mentioned in despatches, and before Antwerp. At the conclusion of peace he received a Gold Medal and two clasps for having commanded a battalion at Ciudad Rodrigo, Badajoz, and Salamanca, and was made a CB. When war again broke out in 1815, he accompanied the 1st Battalion rifles to Belgium as regimental major, and commanded the light companies of Kempt's brigade of Picton's division at Quatre Bras, and his battalion at the Battle of Waterloo, from the period of Barnard's wound until the close of the day, when he was himself wounded in the throat. Cameron saw no more active service, and his latter years are marked only by promotions and honours. In October 1815 he was made a knight of the Russian Order of St Anne; in 1830 he was promoted colonel; in 1832 he was appointed deputy-governor of St. Mawes; in 1838 he was promoted major-general, and made a KCB; in 1846 he received the colonelcy of the 74th Regiment. On 26 July 1850 he died at Inverailort.
