= George Elder (British Army officer) =

Major-General Sir George Elder KCB
- Born: Inverness-shire, Scotland
- Died: 3 December 1836; Madras, British India
- Military career
- Allegiance: United Kingdom
- Branch: British Army, Portuguese Army
- Service years: 1800–1836
- Rank: Major-General
- Commands: 3rd battalion of Caçadores; 7th Regiment of Portuguese infantry; 5th Brigade (Portugal)
- Conflicts: Anglo-Spanish War (1796–1808); Peninsular War; Campaign in south-west France (1814)
- Awards: Knight Commander of the Order of the Bath; Knight bachelor (United Kingdom); Knight-Commander of the Order of the Tower and Sword; Gold Cross of the Peninsular Gold Medal
- Other work: Lieutenant-Governor of St. John's, Newfoundland

Major-General Sir George Elder KCB (died 3 December 1836) was a British Army officer who fought in the Napoleonic Wars, in the South American Expedition (1806–1807) and the Peninsular War. He was killed in an accident in Madras when he was thrown from his horse.

== Early life ==
Elder, was born in Inverness-shire. He wished to join the British Army as an ensign in the about to be embodied Highland Corps. However he was disappointed in his just expectations, and a temporary bar was placed to his ardent desire to join the Army, but his decided military bent, and qualifications, were not unobserved; and in November, 1800, he was appointed to a Second Lieutenancy in the Experimental Corps of Riflemen, commanded by Colonel Coote Manningham.

== Stationed in England ==
In the Rifles, Lieutenant Elder served alongside several colleagues who, like him, eventually rose to high ranks through their professional performance. These officers maintained a consistent professional regard for Elder and acknowledged his advancement within the service. Colonel Manningham's corps underwent training at Weymouth, where George III monitored its development and its progress toward established standards of discipline and efficiency.

Lieutenant Elder's uniform good conduct and strict attention to his duty procured for him the particular approbation of Sir Sidney Beckwith, who was desirous that so deserving an officer should obtain by purchase a First Lieutenancy then for sale in the corps; but Lieutenant Elder's sense of independence and of duty to his family would not allow him to apply for the required sum, much to the disappointment of his excellent friend Sir Sidney. However, Lieutenant Elder going, shortly after, on leave of absence, and another First Lieutenancy (in 1803) offering for purchase. Sir Sidney Beckwith most generously and delicately (without naming the matter to his protege) advanced the money for its attainment, and the promotion took place. The price of this step was subsequently repaid, accompanied with the grateful acknowledgments of Lieutenant Elder's brother.

While stationed at Shorncliffe Army Camp, in 1805, under the command of the Sir John Moore, Lieutenant Elder's assiduity in the performance of his duties, and the excellent state of discipline to which he had brought his company, so attracted the attention of that General Moore, that on the occasion of the militia being allowed to volunteer for the line, he was pleased to say that he would recommend Lieutenant Elder to the Commander-in-Chief for a company, if successful in obtaining men (for which duty he was detached), and on his return with the prescribed number, he was promoted to a company in the 2nd battalion 95th Rifles.

== South American Expedition ==
Captain Elder's company formed part of the detachment from the Rifle corps employed on the expedition to South America in 1806. The Naval and Military Gazette alludes to Captain Elder's services at Monte Video in the following terms:

In 1806 he embarked with a detachment of three companies on the secret expedition, which terminated in the assault and capture of Mone Video, the troops on which occasion were under the command of Brigadier-General Achmuty. In this affair the conduct of Captain Elder was particularly conspicuous, he having led his company to the breach, and established himself on the ramparts, in defiance of a numerous body of the enemy then pressing hard upon him. In the confusion the vigilant eye of Captain Elder saw the importance of occupying the tower of the Cathedral, and he at once took possession of it, and by his flanking fire succeeded in driving the enemy from their guns, and enabled the troops to clear the ramparts. For this eminent service he received the thanks of the officer commanding. In 1807, on the arrival of the force under Brigadier-General Craufurd, Captain Elder moved on with his corps to the attack of Buenos Ayres, and on the march, being with the advanced guard, he had an opportunity of distinguishing himself, by throwing a bridge across a small river in two hours, which enabled the artillery to pass over rapidly, and which led to the total discomfiture of a force of Spaniards, consisting of 5000 men, by the light brigade, only amounting to fourteen companies of riflemen and artillery. On this occasion eleven pieces of artillery were taken from the enemy, principally owing to a charge of Captain Elder's company on the flank, aided by a bold advance of the line.

Captain Elder further had the good fortune to be most favourably noticed for his zeal and ability by Brigadier-General Robert Craufurd, who, on the disembarkation of the troops in the Bay of Barragon, personally inspected the manner in which the sentries had been posted, which called forth the General's marked approbation; and he declared that had he himself placed them, he could not have done it better. At the same time asking the name of the officer who had performed that duty, he was informed it was Captain Elder.

On the pursuit of the enemy by Brigadier-General Craufurd, Captain Elder was requested to reconnoitre a position, and while engaged on this service, a party of the enemy who had concealed themselves in a trench, fired on Captain Elder, and wounded him dangerously in the groin. He fell instantly; when the Brigadier-General seeing it, and believing him killed, exclaimed, "There falls as brave and gallant a fellow as ever lived!".

Elder was carried off the field, and for a considerable time doubts were entertained of his ever recovering. He had lost entirely the use of his limbs, but the strength of his iron constitution brought him through. The ball was never extracted, but was supposed to have lodged near the spine, and he often suffered great pain from its effects. (Note: In addition to his many hair-breadth escapes in combat, he also owed his life to the kindness of Dr. Robb, then of the 1st Battalion 95th: Captain Elder, when slowly recovering from his dangerous wound, was about to be embarked from Buenos Ayres for England on board the Alexander, hospital-ship, which was crowded with sick and wounded. Captain Elder expressing a wish to be under the immediate care of his friend, Dr. Robb, that gentleman produced for him accommodation on board his own vessel, though he belonged to the other battalion. The Alexander foundered at sea, and but very few persons were saved, who by means of their boat, after enduring great hardships, succeeded in making one of the Western Islands. Dr. Robb had before saved Captain Elder's life when bathing in the sea at Weymouth. They had taken a boat, and at a considerable distance from the shore were swimming about, when Captain Elder was seized with the cramp, and crying cut in great distress, his friend reached him at the critical moment, and fortunately succeeded in saving him — The United Service Magazine.)

Captain Elder acted as a witness in Whitlocke's court-martial after the failure on invasion of Buenos Aires.

During the confusion of that day one of us received an order from the fiery Craufurd to shoot the traitor dead if we could see him in the battle, many others of the Rifles receiving the same order from that fine and chivalrous officer. The unfortunate issue of the Buenos Ayres affair is matter of history, and I have nothing to say about it; but I well remember the impression that it made upon us all at the time, and that Sir John Moore was present at Whitelocke's court-martial; General Craufurd and, I think, General Auchmuty, Captain Elder of the Rifles, Captain Dickson, and one of our privates being witnesses. We were at Hythe at the time, and I recollect our officers going off to appear against Whitelocke.

— Benjamin Harris.

== Peninsular War ==
In 1808 Captain Elder joined the army under Sir John Moore in the Peninsula, and was almost daily engaged with the enemy while covering the retreat of the Army upon Corunna. He embarked for England after the battle of Corunna (in which he was engaged) with the remains of his corps; and in April, 1809, being one of the twenty officers originally chosen, he was promoted to a majority, and appointed by Marshal Beresford to the command of the 3rd battalion of Caçadores in the Portuguese Army, with the rank of Lieutenant-Colonel in that service. (Note: For this advancement to Lieutenant-Colonel he owed to the strong recommendations the General Officers under whom he had served.)

It was said that "in the 95th he was beloved and respected by every officer and soldier in the corps, and all viewed his honours and promotions with delight", and on leaving, the company he had commanded presented Major Elder with a silver-mounted sabre, suitably inscribed, as a memorial of their respect and gratitude.

Lieutenant-Colonel Elder was indefatigable in training and disciplining his battalion, and when their improvement was considerably advanced, Lord Wellington and Marshal Beresford reviewed them, when his Lordship said to him, "Colonel Elder, the Marshal and myself are under great obligations to you for the fine state of discipline to which you have brought your battalion, and to your country you have rendered a most essential service".

At the commencement of the Portuguese campaign, the 3rd battalion of Caçadores was attached to the Light Division in advance of the Allied Army. On 18 July 1810, in the affair of Almeida, Lieutenant-Colonel Elder received the congratulations of Major-General Craufurd for the gallant conduct of his battalion in an attack upon two squadrons of French cavalry who were nearly destroyed. During this affair the remainder of the Light Division cheered the Caçadores from an eminence in the rear.

On 24 July, in the severe action of the Côa, the 3rd battalion was particularly mentioned in Orders by Marshal Beresford, who, in thanking the Commanding Officer and corps, observed that "their brilliant conduct on that occasion was in every respect equal to that of British troops".

On the evening preceding the Battle of Busaco, the 3rd Caçadores were closely engaged with the enemy's advance in front of the position, when Lieutenant-Colonel Elder's horse was shot under him. During the battle, the 3rd Caçadores were engaged for the whole of 27 September, and the morning of the 28th, Wellington in his orders was pleased to say that "the 3rd Caçadores, under the command of Lieutenant-Colonel Elder, have added to their former reputation by their gallant behaviour, which was admired not only by his Excellency, but by the Army in general".

While the Army retired on the Lines of Torres Vedras, the 3rd Caçadores distinguished themselves particularly at Alenquer, where, owing to a heavy rain and thick fog, the French succeeded in entering the village unobserved. Here the Caçadores promptly formed, and taking possession of a height commanding the bridge, held it against a division of the enemy, until that part of the Allied Army occupying Alenquer had time to form and retreat to their respective stations.

From the arrival of the Allied Army in the lines of Torres Vedras, Lieutenant-Colonel Elder's corps occupied the outposts of the light division; and on Massena's retreat to the position of Santarem, it covered the advance of the Army, and was on several occasions closely engaged with the rear-guard of the enemy.

Whilst the French Army were in the position of Santarem (upwards of three months) Lieutenant-Colonel Elder was entrusted with the occupation of the bridge and two forts of Ponte Solario, the most advanced post of the Allied Army, and to which the greatest responsibility was attached. During this service the corps equalled the expectations formed of it.

On the retreat of the enemy from Santarem, Lieutenant-Colonel Elder, always in advance, had repeatedly the honour of being opposed to the Marshal Ney, and while thus employed, took, and kept possession of the Castle of Pombal until the arrival of the Allied Army. Here he maintained his position for upwards of ten hours against the rear-guard of the enemy, consisting of, at least, ten thousand men, and the loss sustained by the 3rd Caçadores was very considerable; but Lieutenant-Colonel Elder and his corps received the thanks of the Commander-in-Chief, and the praise of the whole Army.

On the day following Elder was engaged with the right of the enemy's advanced posts, and Lord Wellington was pleased to state in General Orders, "that he had never witnessed a more brilliant attack than that made by the 52nd Regiment, and Lieutenant-Colonel Elder's Caçadores, in driving the enemy from the heights of Redinha".

On 13 March 1811 his battalion was ordered to turn the enemy's right flank on the position of the Serra d'Estrella, and falling in with them at Chao da Lama (whilst they were attacked in front by the light division), he participated in driving them from the heights. On the following evening, 15 March 1811, the Caçadores composed a part of the troops which attacked the enemy with such rapidity at Foz d'Arouce that they were thrown into confusion; and in crossing the river they lost an eagle, and a number of men and officers were drowned.

Lieutenant-Colonel Elder's corps was again engaged in the skirmish at Guarda; and in the attack at Sabugal (3 April 1811) it forded the river in two places in front of the light division, driving in the enemy's advanced pickets. Lieutenant-Colonel Elder received the thanks of Lord Wellington in the field, and afterwards in Orders, for his conduct on that occasion.

The Allied Army going into quarters on the frontiers of Portugal, Lieutenant-Colonel Elder, with the 3rd Cacadores, was sent in advance to the village of Espeja, in Spain, and there they distinguished themselves by repulsing, in square, an attack of seven squadrons of the enemy's cavalry, who suffered severely in killed and wounded. The corps was publicly thanked by General Craufurd for their steady and determined conduct on that day.

In the battle of Fuentes d'Onore, on the morning of 5 May 1811, Lieutenant-Colonel Elder was engaged in covering the light division in the wood on the right of the line, from whence they were obliged to retire in square, being attacked by nearly the whole of the enemy's cavalry. After the battle Elder was recommended for, and appointed, in May, 1811, to a British Lieutenant-Colonelcy, as a remuneration for his services.

From this period until the investment of Ciudad Rodrigo, Lieutenant Colonel Elder's corps was constantly in the advance, and had many opportunities of attracting the notice of the Commander of the forces. The 3rd Caçadores was the first corps that broke ground before that fortress; and in the storming and capture it had the honour of leading the light division to the assault under a tremendous fire, carrying, besides their arms, 300 sacks of hay, which they placed in the ditch, and immediately mounted the breach. On their gaining the square, they were publicly thanked by General Picton (commanding the attack) for their gallant conduct, which, besides being praised by Marshal Beresford in Orders, was also particularly mentioned in Lord Wellington's dispatch of 28 January 1812, wherein, after recording the merits of various officers, Wellington wrote, "Lieutenant-Colonel Elder and the 3rd Caçadores were likewise distinguished on this occasion".

At the storming of Badajoz, Lieutenant-Colonel Elder, led a brigade, composed of the 1st and 3rd battalions of Caçadores, and five companies of his old regiment the 95th, to the great breach, where he fell desperately wounded. He was left on the spot for dead, the troops passing over his body. Returning animated with blaze of fire around him, enabled Colonel Elder to distinguish members of the 95th; and he had just strength enough to call out "Elder, Elder!" when two of his former company lifted him up and carried him into Badajoz, where he was for a considerable time confined by his wounds, which brought on Tetanus (lockjaw). The particulars of his almost miraculous recovery from the effects of his wounds, owing to the skilful treatment and incessant attention of his friend. Dr. Charles Fergusson Forbes, are vividly depicted in The Table-Talk of an Old Campaigner, written by that Forbes, and published in this Journal for September, 1834. (Note: Lord Wellington in his dispatch (7 April 1812, on the capture of Badajoz again recorded his opinion of Lieutenant-Colonel Elder's gallant conduct.)

Being in a precarious state, owing to the severe nature of his wounds, Lieutenant-Colonel Elder was obliged to return to England; but previously to his departure from the Peninsula he was made Knight-Commander of the Order of the Tower and Sword by the Regency of Portugal; and the Prince Regent of the United Kingdom was pleased to confer the honour of knighthood on him soon after his arrival back in England.

In 1813, while yet in a state of convalescence, Sir George Elder rejoined the army. On his arrival in France, he was promoted to the rank of Colonel, and appointed to the command of the 7th Regiment of Portuguese infantry. He was engaged in several skirmishes and affairs of posts. At the very end of the Campaign in south-west France (1814), Elder, at the head of a body of troops—upwards of three thousand—he captured the Fortress of Blaye, (on the right bank of the river Gironde downstream of Bordeaux); and the terms of capitulation dictated by Elder to the governor of it—General De Haveland, commanding the 11th division—were much approved of by Lord Dalhousie, under whose immediate command he was then serving.

At the peace of 1814, Sir George Elder accompanied the Portuguese Army on their return to their native country, when he was, in 1816, promoted to the rank of brigadier in that service, and subsequently to that of Major-General, with the command of a brigade (the 5th) in the Alemtejo.

== Postbellum ==
On the distribution of honours by the Prince Regent, Sir George Elder was decorated with the Gold Cross of the Peninsular Gold Medal for the general actions and assaults of Busaco, Fuentes d'Onore, Ciudad Rodrigo, and Badajoz.

Elder left Portugal in 1823, but visited it again in 1830, when he was received with marks of high distinction by its Sovereign, the court, and the brave officers and men who had gained renown under his guidance, or had witnessed his gallant deeds.

He had received nine wounds in battle, eight of which were considered dangerous or severe, and for them Sir George Elder had been granted a pension from the British Government, which was continued until a regulation was made that only those who had lost a limb, or had suffered injuries which should be deemed equivalent to it, might continue to enjoy such allowance. But George IV, in consideration of his sufferings, conferred on him the appointment of Lieutenant-Governor of St. John's, Newfoundland. Sir George Elder was promoted to the rank of Major General in 1830, on which occasion William IV nominated him a Knight Commander of the Order of the Bath; and he received the Star of a Spanish order from Ferdinand VII in addition to that of the Tower and Sword.

== Death ==
In August 1836 Major-General Sir George Elder left England, having been selected to serve on the staff at Madras. On 3 December, just one week after he arrived in Madras, he died in a horse riding accident:

The demise of this gallant officer took place on the 3rd December, about half-past five o'clock. It appears that Sir George was mounted on a very spirited horse, and called at Waller's stables for the purpose of giving some directions to Mr. Waller. Immediately on leaving the stables, the horse went off at score up the Mount-road, and when opposite the road leading to the Commander-in-Chief's house the horse attempted to turn, which Sir George tried unsuccessfully to prevent, when both rider and horse came with great violence against a tree, and it is supposed that this concussion was the cause of death to the gallant General, who had maintained his seat fill that moment. After the concussion the horse stopped short, kicked up, and threw his rider off forwards. Captain Deas, 6th Madras Light Cavalry, happened to be passing at the time in Mr. Scott's carriage, and was instantly at Sir George's side; he never spoke; and on being lifted into the carriage, appeared quite dead. The body was taken to Dr. 0'Neil's house, which was not far from the spot where the fatal accident occurred, All the injuries the General received were on the left side of the body; several of the ribs were broken; the heart and left lobe of the lungs torn Open, and the spleen lacerated. The extensive injuries received in the chest must have caused instantaneous death. The head was but very slightly injured; the left arm was broken. Sir George landed at Madras on November 27th, exactly a week before his funeral.'

He was followed to the grave, with every mark of honour and respect, by the military and civil authorities, and a large portion of the population of Madras.
