= Anglo-Portuguese Army =

Combined English and Portuguese army during the Peninsular War

Anglo-Portuguese Army Exército Anglo-Luso
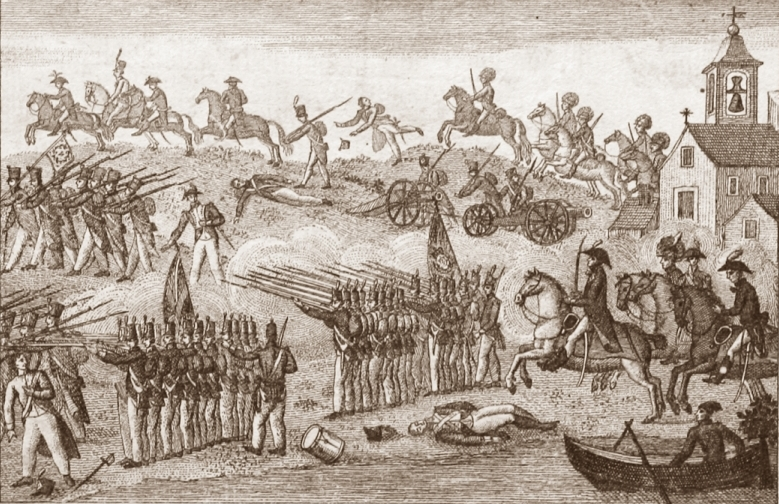
- British and Portuguese regiments, side by side, at the Second Battle of Porto.
- Active: 22 April 1809
- Disbanded: 1814
- Country: United Kingdom; Portugal
- Allegiance: George III of the United Kingdom; John VI of Portugal
- Size: 53,000 British; 3,000 Hanoverians of the KGL; 35,000 Portuguese Regulars
- Garrison/HQ: Lisbon, Portugal
- Engagements: Battle of Roliça; Battle of Vimeiro; Second Battle of Porto; Battle of Grijó; Battle of the Côa; Battle of Bussaco; Battle of Pombal; Battle of Redinha; Battle of Campo Maior; Battle of Sabugal; Blockade of Almeida; Battle of Fuentes de Oñoro; Battle of Albuera; Battle of Arroyo dos Molinos; Siege of Ciudad Rodrigo (1812); Siege of Badajoz (1812); Battle of Almaraz; Battle of Salamanca; Battle of Majadahonda; Siege of Burgos; Battle of Vitoria; Siege of San Sebastián; Battle of Roncesvalles (1813); Battle of the Pyrenees; Battle of Sorauren; Battle of the Bidassoa (1813); Battle of Nivelle; Battle of Nive; Battle of Garris; Battle of Orthez; Battle of Toulouse (1814); Battle of Bayonne

Commanders
- Commander-in-chief: Arthur Wellesley
- Notable commanders: Brent Spencer, Carlos Frederico Lecor, Luís do Rego Barreto, Henry Clinton, James Leith, John Hope, Lowry Cole, Robert Craufurd, Rowland Hill, Thomas Picton, William Beresford

The Anglo-Portuguese Army was the combined British and Portuguese army that participated in the Peninsular War, under the command of Arthur Wellesley. The Army is also referred to as the British-Portuguese Army and, in Portuguese, as the Exército Anglo-Luso or the Exército Anglo-Português.

The Anglo-Portuguese Army was established with the British Army deployed to the Iberian Peninsula under the command of General Arthur Wellesley, and the Portuguese Army rebuilt under the leadership of British General William Beresford and the Portuguese War Secretary Miguel Pereira Forjaz. The new Portuguese battalions were supplied with British equipment, trained to British standards and thoroughly re-organised. Incompetent or corrupt officers were cashiered and appropriate replacements were appointed or promoted from amongst promising Non-commissioned officers.

On 22 April 1809, Wellesley became Commander-in-Chief of the British Army in the Peninsula, replacing General Cradock, whose assessment of the military situation the British government found too pessimistic. At the same time he was appointed by the Portuguese Government as Commander-in-Chief of the Portuguese Army. He then came to have the two armies under his command, transforming them into a single integrated army.

The Army was organised into divisions, most of them including mixed British-Portuguese units. Usually, each one had two British and one Portuguese brigades. In the elite Light Division, the brigades themselves were mixed, each including two British light infantry and one Portuguese Caçadores battalions.

== Order of battle ==
The following tables show the order of battle and commanders of the Anglo-Portuguese Army at various stages in the Peninsular War.

	July 1809	September 1810	May 1811	September 1811
Commander in Chief	Lt Gen Sir Arthur Wellesley	Lt Gen Viscount Wellington	Lt Gen Viscount Wellington	Lt Gen the Earl of Wellington
Corps Commanders	–	–	Maj Gen Brent Spencer Marshal William Carr Beresford	Maj Gen Rowland Hill Lt Gen Sir Thomas Graham
Cavalry	Lt Gen William Payne	-	Maj Gen Stapleton Cotton Maj Gen Sir William Erskine	Lt Gen Sir Stapleton Cotton
1st Division	Maj Gen John Coape Sherbrooke	Maj Gen Brent Spencer	Maj Gen Miles Nightingall	Lt Gen Sir Thomas Graham
2nd Division	Maj Gen Rowland Hill	Maj Gen Rowland Hill	Maj Gen the Hon William Stewart	Maj Gen the Hon William Stewart
3rd Division	Maj Gen Alexander Randoll Mackenzie	Maj Gen Thomas Picton	Maj Gen Thomas Picton	Maj Gen Thomas Picton
4th Division	Brig Gen Alexander Campbell	Maj Gen the Hon Lowry Cole	Maj Gen the Hon Lowry Cole	Maj Gen the Hon Lowry Cole
5th Division	–	Maj Gen James Leith	Maj Gen Sir William Erskine	Maj Gen James Dunlop
6th Division	–	–	Maj Gen Alexander Campbell	Maj Gen Alexander Campbell
7th Division	–	–	Maj Gen William Houston	Maj Gen John Sontag
Light Division	–	Brig Gen Robert Craufurd	Brig Gen Robert Craufurd	Brig Gen Robert Craufurd
Portuguese Division	–	Maj Gen John Hamilton	Maj Gen John Hamilton	Maj Gen John Hamilton
Independent Brigades	–	Brig Gen Denis Pack; Brig Gen Alexander Campbell; Brig Gen Francis John Colman	Maj Gen Charles, Baron von Alten; Col Charles Ashworth; Col Richard Collins	Brig Gen Denis Pack; Brig Gen Thomas McMahon; Col Charles Ashworth

	July 1812	June 1813	November 1813	April 1814
Commander in Chief	Lt Gen the Earl of Wellington	Lt Gen the Marquess of Wellington	Field Marshal the Marquess of Wellington	Field Marshal the Marquess of Wellington
Corps Commanders	Maj Gen Rowland Hill	Lt Gen Sir Rowland Hill Lt Gen the Earl of Dalhousie Lt Gen Sir Thomas Graham	Lt Gen Sir Rowland Hill Lt Gen the Hon Sir John Hope Maj Gen Charles, Baron von Alten Marshal Sir William Carr Beresford	Lt Gen Sir Rowland Hill Lt Gen the Hon Sir John Hope Marshal Sir William Carr Beresford
Cavalry	Lt Gen Sir Stapleton Cotton	Lt Gen Sir Stapleton Cotton	Lt Gen Sir Stapleton Cotton	Lt Gen Sir Stapleton Cotton
1st Division	Maj Gen Henry Frederick Campbell	Maj Gen Kenneth Alexander Howard	Maj Gen Kenneth Alexander Howard	Maj Gen Kenneth Alexander Howard
2nd Division	Maj Gen the Hon William Stewart	Lt Gen the Hon William Stewart	Lt Gen the Hon William Stewart	Lt Gen the Hon William Stewart
3rd Division	Col the Hon Edward Pakenham	Lt Gen Sir Thomas Picton	Maj Gen the Hon Charles Colville	Lt Gen Sir Thomas Picton
4th Division	Maj Gen the Hon Lowry Cole	Lt Gen the Hon Sir Lowry Cole	Lt Gen the Hon Sir Lowry Cole	Lt Gen the Hon Sir Lowry Cole
5th Division	Maj Gen James Leith	Maj Gen John Oswald	Maj Gen Andrew Hay	Maj Gen Andrew Hay
6th Division	Maj Gen Henry Clinton	Maj Gen Henry Clinton	Lt Gen Sir Henry Clinton	Lt Gen Sir Henry Clinton
7th Division	Maj Gen John Hope	Lt Gen the Earl of Dalhousie	Maj Gen Carlos Lecor	Maj Gen George Townshend Walker
Light Division	Maj Gen Charles, Baron von Alten	Maj Gen Charles, Baron von Alten	Maj Gen Charles, Baron von Alten	Maj Gen Charles, Baron von Alten
Portuguese Division	Maj Gen John Hamilton	Maj Gen Francisco da Silveira	Lt Gen Sir John Hamilton	Maj Gen Carlos Lecor
Independent Brigades	Brig Gen Denis Pack; Brig Gen Thomas Bradford	Brig Gen Denis Pack; Brig Gen Thomas Bradford	Maj Gen Lord Aylmer; Brig Gen John Wilson; Maj Gen Thomas Bradford	Maj Gen Lord Aylmer; Maj Gen Alexander Campbell; Maj Gen Thomas Bradford

== See also ==
- Army of Spain (Peninsular War)
- Lines of Torres Vedras
- King's German Legion
- Anglo-Portuguese Alliance

== Bibliography ==
- Bluth, B.J. (2001). Marching with Sharpe. UK: HarperCollins. ISBN 0-00-414537-2.
- Bryant, Arthur (1950). The Age of Elegance: 1812–1822. London: Collins.
- Chandler, David; Beckett, Ian (2003). The Oxford History of the British Army. UK: Oxford University Press. ISBN 0-19-280311-5.
- Chappell, Mike (2004). Wellington's Peninsula Regiments (2): The Light Infantry. Oxford: Osprey Publishing. ISBN 1-84176-403-5.
- Fletcher, Ian; Younghusband, William (1994). Wellington's Foot Guards. UK: Osprey Publishing. ISBN 1-85532-392-3.
- Fregosi, Paul (1989). Dreams of Empire: Napoleon and the first World War, 1792–1815. Hutchinson. ISBN 0-09-173926-8.
- Glover, Michael (1974). The Peninsular War 1807–1814: A Concise Military History. UK: David & Charles. ISBN 0-7153-6387-5.
- Haythornthwaite, Philip J. (1987). British Infantry of the Napoleonic Wars. London: Arms and Armour Press. ISBN 0-85368-890-7.
- —— (1996). Weapons & Equipment of the Napoleonic Wars. Arms and Armour Press. ISBN 1-85409-495-5.
- Napier, Sir William Francis Patrick (1952). English Battles and Sieges in the Peninsula. London: Chapman & Hall.
- Nofi, Albert A. (1998). The Waterloo Campaign: June 1815. USA: Da Capo Press. ISBN 0-938289-98-5.
- Sumner, Ian; Hook, Richard (2001). British Colours and Standards 1747–1881 (2): Infantry. UK: Osprey Publishing. ISBN 1-84176-201-6.
- Venning, Annabel (2005). Following the Drum: The Lives of Army Wives and Daughters Past and Present. London: Headline Publishing. ISBN 0-7553-1258-9.
