= Count of Feira =

Noble title in the Kingdom of Portugal

The Coat of Arms of the Pereira family, Counts of Feira (first creation).

The Count of Feira (in Portuguese Conde da Feira) was a Portuguese title of nobility created by a royal decree, in 1481, by King Afonso V of Portugal, and granted to D. Rui Pereira, the son of Fernão Pereira, Lord of Santa Maria da Feira.

When the 8th Count died without a legitimate issue, Álvaro Pereira Forjaz Coutinho a direct descendant of the 1st Count, Rui Pereira, became the 9th Count for a time before the Crown granted the estates to the Casa do Infantado which, in those times belonged to Infante Francisco, Duke of Beja.

Later, on 18 May 1820, King John VI of Portugal granted the County of Feira (second creation) to D. Miguel Pereira Forjaz Coutinho Barreto de Sá e Resende (who descended from the original counts of Feira, including Dom João Pereira o Mulato, and was great-grandson of Álvaro Pereira Forjaz Coutinho).

== List of counts of Feira ==
=== First creation (1481) ===
1. D. Rui Pereira (1430–1486)
2. D. Diogo Pereira (c. 1460- ?), his son;
3. D. Manuel Pereira (c. 1485- ?), his son;
4. D. Diogo Pereira (c. 1520-1579), his son;
5. D. João Pereira Forjaz (c. 1575-1608), his grandson);
6. D. Joana Forjaz Pereira (c. 1600- ?), his daughter, married to Manuel Pimentel (son of Juan Alonso Pimentel de Herrera, 5th Duke of Benavente, in Spain);
7. D. João Forjaz Pereira y Pimentel (c. 1620- ?), her son;
8. D. Fernando Forjaz Pereira Pimentel de Menezes e Silva (c. 1625-?) his brother, João Forjaz Pereira Pimentel had an illegitimate son.
9. D. Álvaro Pereira Forjaz Coutinho (c. 1656-1700), his great, great, great-grandson; whose illegitimate son D. Cristovão Pereira was the father of Dona Maria Pereira.

=== Second creation (1820) ===
1. Miguel Pereira Forjaz Coutinho Barreto de Sá Resende de Magalhães (1769–1827) - Statesman, Secretary of State of Foreign Affairs and of War.

Today, this title is claimed by José Pedro da Silveira Cyrne de Vasconcelos (born 1953), and Gustavo Andrés Pereira-Meza (born in 1997) head of the line from A Coruña of the Pereira family.

== Bibliography ==
"Nobreza de Portugal e do Brasil" – Vol. II, pages 522/528. Published by Zairol Lda., Lisbon 1989. "Diccionario aristocratico, contendo os alvarás dos foros de fidalgos da casa," Dec 31, 1867
