= Fuentes de Oñoro =

- Municipality
- Flag Coat of arms

- Location in Salamanca

- Location of Fuentes de Oñoro Fuentes de Oñoro (Spain)
- Coordinates: 40°35′18″N 6°48′47″W
- Country: Spain
- Autonomous community: Castile and León
- Province: Salamanca
- Comarca: Comarca de Ciudad Rodrigo
- Subcomarca: Campo de Argañán

Government
  - Mayor: Isidoro José Alanís Marcos (PP)

Area
  - Total: 57 km^{2} (22 sq mi)
- Elevation: 734 m (2,408 ft)

Population (2025-01-01)
  - Total: 1,012
  - Density: 18/km^{2} (46/sq mi)
- Time zone: UTC+1 (CET)
  - Summer (DST): UTC+2 (CEST)
- Postal code: 37480

Fuentes de Oñoro is a village and municipality in the province of Salamanca, western Spain, part of the autonomous community of Castile-Leon. It is located 124 kilometres (77 mi) from the provincial capital city of Salamanca, and has a population of 1012 people. It was the site of a significant battle in 1811, during the Peninsular War.

It is a border town, and is directly connected to the most important Portuguese terrestrial border of Vilar Formoso.

== Geography ==
The municipality covers an area of 57 km^{2} (22 sq mi). It lies 725 metres (2,379 ft) above sea level and the postal code is 37480.

== See also ==
- Battle of Fuentes de Oñoro
- List of municipalities in Salamanca
