= Battle of Sabugal =

1811 battle during the Peninsular War

- Part of the Peninsular War
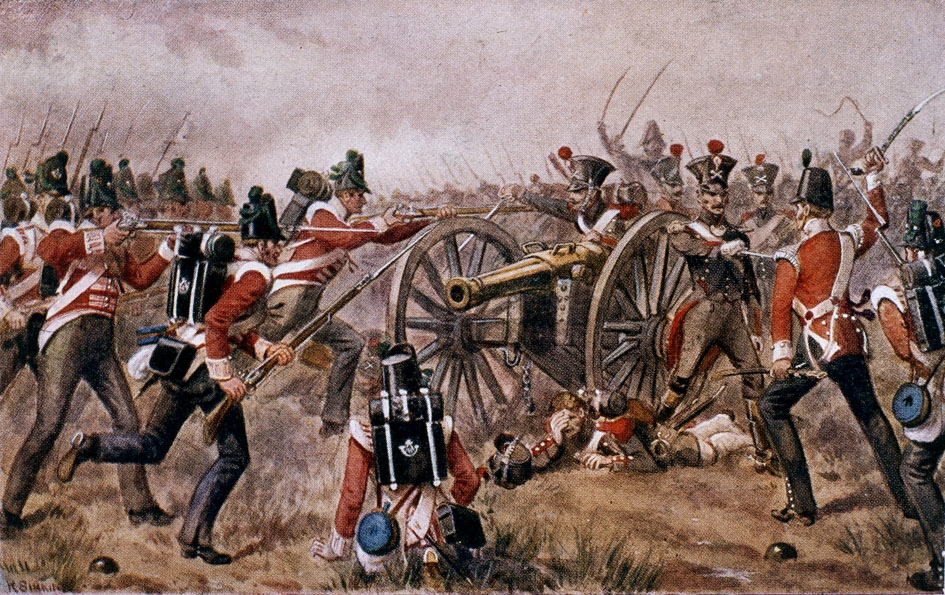
- The 43rd Regiment of Foot during the battle
Date	3 April 1811
Location	Sabugal, Portugal 40°21′N 7°05′W
Result	Anglo-Portuguese victory

Belligerents
United Kingdom; Portugal	French Empire

Commanders and leaders
(United Kingdom of Great Britain and Ireland) Arthur Wellesley (United Kingdom) Sir William Erskine	(First French Empire) André Masséna (First French Empire) Jean Reynier

Strength
10,000	12,000

Casualties and losses
500	1,500

Peninsular war: Portugal
1807 1808 1809 1810 1811

The Battle of Sabugal was a meeting engagement of the Peninsular War which took place on 3 April 1811 between Anglo-Portuguese forces under Arthur Wellesley (later the Duke of Wellington) and French troops under the command of Marshal André Masséna. It was the last of many skirmishes between Masséna's retreating French forces and those of the Anglo-Portuguese under Wellington, who were pursuing him after the failed 1810 French invasion of Portugal.

In poor weather, with heavy rain and fog, Allied forces succeeded in forcing the demoralized, undersupplied French force into retreat. At Sabugal, as in the subsequent Battle of Fuentes de Oñoro, the French command, in particular Jean Reynier, ineffectively interacted with their supreme commander, Masséna, who had no respect among his subordinate commanders from the very beginning of the Portuguese campaign. The victory was lauded by the British; Sir Harry Smith, then a junior officer of the 95th Rifles and a participant in the battle, remarked "Oh, you Kings and usurpers should view these scenes and moderate ambition" while Wellesley later referred to the Light Division's action in the battle as "one of the most glorious that British troops were ever engaged in".

== Background ==
For almost a year the defensive Lines of Torres Vedras were under construction, and thanks to a tight intelligence blockade, everything was kept secret. Wellington declared that the French would not be able to dislodge him from Portugal with an army of less than 100,000 men, whilst Napoleon provided Masséna with only 65,000. By October 1810, Marshal Masséna's French army had been halted by the Lines of Torres Vedras, and the Peninsular War had reached a stalemate. Realising that a drive on to Lisbon before the onset of winter was unlikely, Masséna prepared to see out the winter months and renew the fight in the spring, despite scorched earth policies by the Allies rendering foraging for food very difficult. Having survived the winter, however, Masséna order a general retreat on 3 March 1811, and the British forces under Wellesley followed. By the onset of April, the French forces were just inside Portugal, aligned along the Côa river. Jean-Baptiste Drouet, Comte d'Erlon's 9th Corps defended to the north, Louis Henri Loison's 6th Corps was in the centre and Jean Reynier's 2nd Corps held the south flank at Sabugal. Resting in the rear areas was Jean-Andoche Junot's 8th Corps. It was at Sabugal that Wellesley attempted to crush the French flank by attacking forces of the isolated 2nd Corps.

While the 1st, 3rd, 5th and 7th British-Portuguese divisions performed a frontal attack, the flanking Light Division miscalculated and attacked the French 2nd Corps in the flank rather than from the rear. With the leading British units cut off, and poor weather approaching, the British situation became increasingly difficult.

== The battle ==
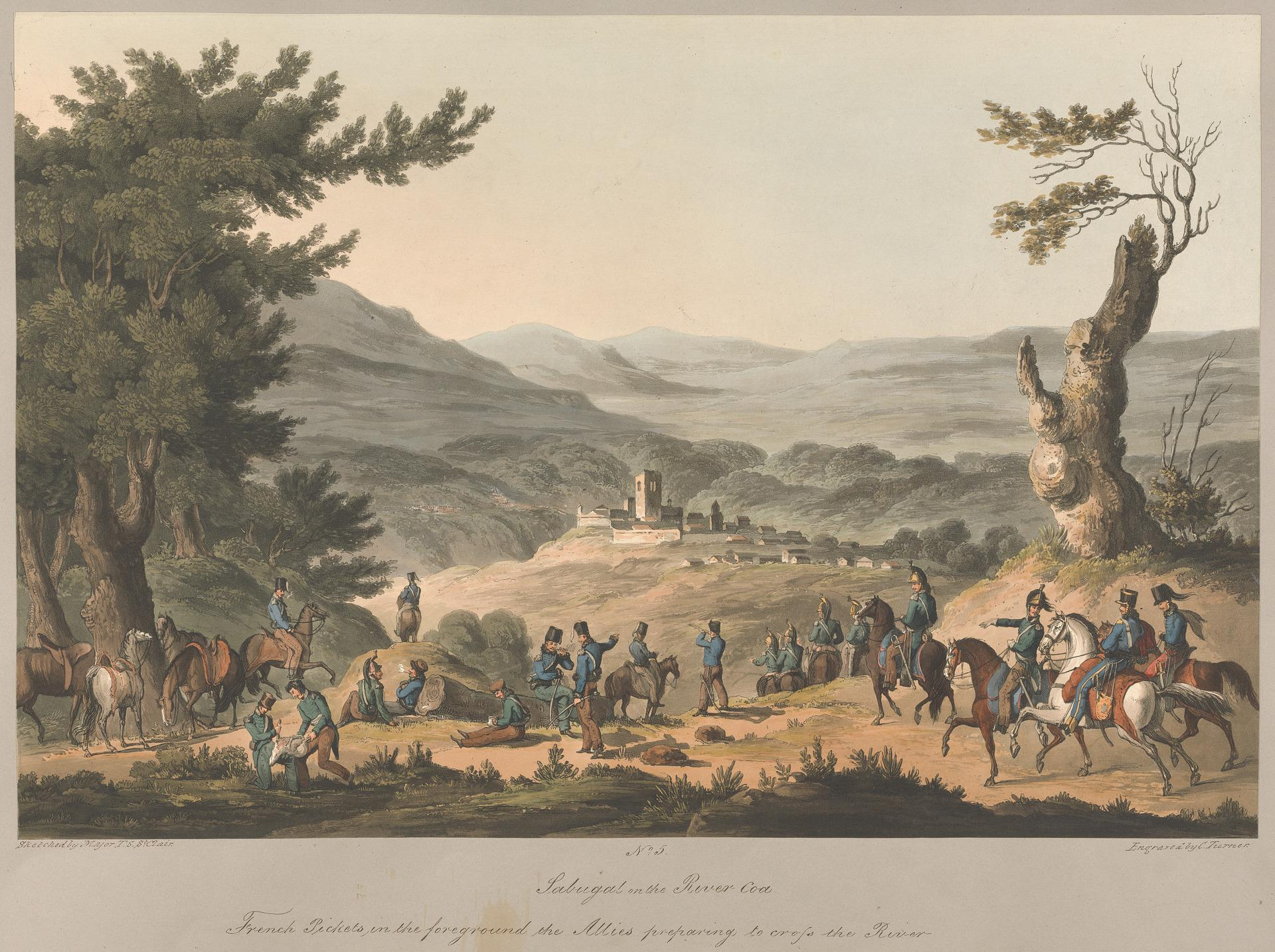
The River Coa, French pickets in the foreground, the Allies preparing to cross the River

The 1st Brigade of the British-Portuguese Light Division crossed the Côa at 10.00 hrs on the morning of 3 April. The French 4th Légére (Light) from Pierre Hugues Victoire Merle's 1st Division was alerted by musket fire as the 1st Brigade drove off a small number of French pickets. The French formed a column and advanced on the British. While making good progress initially, the concentrated French force was driven back by British artillery. The 1st Brigade followed the retreating French forces up a nearby hill, but was quickly ousted by the remaining French forces, who still held a considerable numerical advantage. The British were forced back into cover behind some small stone walls. Heavy rain had also begun to interfere with the muskets of both sides. An attempted counter-attack by the 1st Brigade also ended in failure, as the French had in the meantime set up artillery. Together with further French reinforcements, Reynier forced the British back to the cover of the stone walls at the foot of the hill.

The crest was attacked for a third time by the 1st Brigade, now supported by the 2nd Brigade, which had arrived on the battlefield. While the French were initially pushed back, Reynier sent in a stream of French units to meet the arriving British 16th Light Dragoons and the surviving soldiers of the 1st and 2nd. With the rain clearing, Reynier could also see the British divisions beginning a frontal assault. This sight persuaded Reynier to pull back; however, the British were successful in seizing both his and General Pierre Soult's baggage carts, even if bad weather did prevent them from mounting a full pursuit.

A French commander, Baron Thiébault, blamed the collapse of the 2nd Corps for the French defeat on 3 April, stating that "It might have been avoided if General Reynier had had faith in Masséna's foresight". Sources differ in the number of French prisoners taken, ranging from 186 to over 1,500.

== Erskine's role ==
Major-General William Erskine commanded the Light Division during the battle. Wellington planned to have the Light Division and two brigades of cavalry circle behind Reynier's open left flank while the other four divisions attacked in front. When the day dawned with heavy fog, the other commanders decided to wait until visibility improved. Undeterred, Erskine peremptorily ordered Lieut-Colonel Thomas Sydney Beckwith's 1st Brigade forward. Instead of crossing the Côa beyond Reynier's flank, the brigade drifted to the left in the fog, crossed at the wrong location and struck the French left flank.

Erskine, who was very nearsighted and mentally unbalanced, then became cautious and issued explicit instructions to Colonel George Drummond not to support his fellow brigade commander. At this point, Erskine rode off to join the cavalry, leaving the Light Division leaderless for the rest of the battle. Reynier switched most of his 10,000-man corps against Beckwith's 1,500 and pressed the light infantry back. When Drummond heard the sounds of battle approaching, he deduced that Beckwith's men were retreating. Disobeying orders, Drummond led his 2nd Brigade across the Côa and joined Beckwith. Together they drove the French back.

When the mist cleared, Reynier saw the other four divisions advancing in front, led by Thomas Picton's 3rd Division. He quickly withdrew the bulk of the II Corps, leaving 3,000 men of his right flank to hold off four divisions. William Grattan of the 88th Foot noted of the badly outnumbered French, "They never fought better. So rapidly did they fire that instead of returning their ramrods, they stuck them in the ground and continued to fight until overpowered by our men." Reynier admitted the loss of 760 men.

== Aftermath ==
The battle marked the end of the war's third Portuguese campaign, with France driven out of Portugal for good. The conventional war in Iberia would rage until 1814, with the Luso-Spanish border entering a period of stalemate as the Anglo-Portuguese and Spanish armies would contend with French control of key border fortresses resulting in numerous sieges such as first siege of Badajoz and the Blockade of Almeida. These would in turn precipitate relief efforts by the French resulting in actions at Albuera and Fuentes de Oñoro respectively.

== Notes ==
Preceded by Battle of Campo Maior	Napoleonic Wars; Battle of Sabugal	Succeeded by Blockade of Almeida
