= George Brown (British Army officer) =

British Army general (1790–1865)

General The Right Honourable Sir George Brown GCB KH
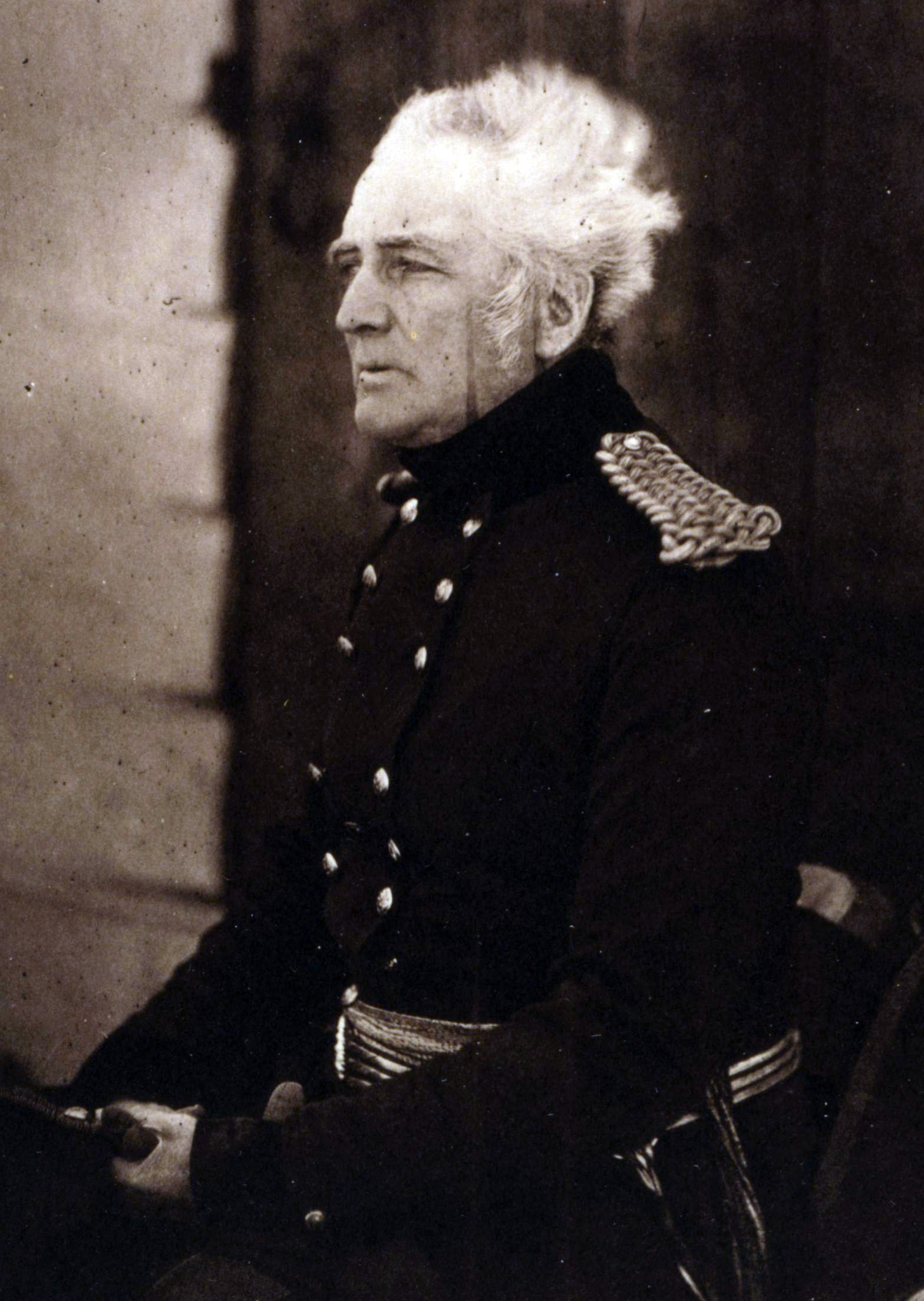
- Sir George Brown, photographed by Roger Fenton in the Crimea in 1855
- Born: 3 July 1790; Linkwood, Elgin, Scotland
- Died: 27 August 1865 (aged 75); Linkwood, Elgin, Scotland
- Military career
- Allegiance: United Kingdom
- Branch: British Army
- Rank: General
- Commands: Light Division
- Awards: Knight Grand Cross of the Order of the Bath; Knight of the Royal Guelphic Order

General Sir George Brown, GCB, KH, PC (Ire) (3 July 1790 – 27 August 1865) was a British officer notable for commands in the Peninsular War and the Crimean War.

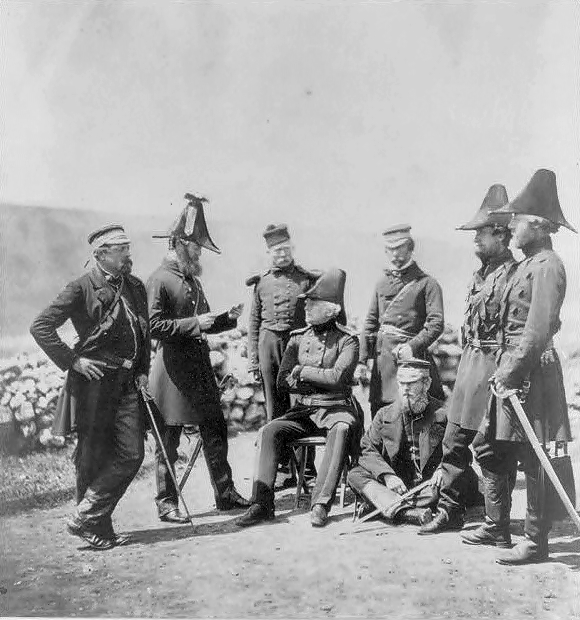
General Brown and his staff in the Crimea.

== Background ==
Brown was born the son of George Brown, Provost of Elgin, at Linkwood, near Elgin, Scotland, and educated in Elgin.

== Military career ==
He obtained a commission in the 43rd (Monmouthshire) Regiment of Foot (Light Infantry) (later the 1st Battalion, Oxfordshire and Buckinghamshire Light Infantry) in 1806, and he was promoted to lieutenant a few months later. He saw active service for the first time in the Mediterranean and at Copenhagen, in 1806 and 1807 respectively. The 43rd was one of the earliest arrivals in Spain when the Peninsular War broke out, and Brown was with his regiment at Vimeiro, and in the Corunna retreat. Later in 1809 the famous Light Division was formed, and with Craufurd he was present at all the actions of 1810–1811, being severely wounded at Talavera; he was then promoted captain and attended the Staff College at Great Marlow until (late in 1812) he returned to the Peninsula as a captain in the 85th. With this regiment he served under Major-General Lord Aylmer at the Nivelle and Nive, his conduct winning for him the rank of major.

The 85th was next employed under General Robert Ross in America, and Brown, who received a severe wound at the action of Bladensburg, was promoted to a lieutenant colonelcy. At the age of twenty-five, with a brilliant war record, he received an appointment at the Royal Horse Guards, and remained in London for over twenty-five years in various staff positions. He was made a colonel and Knight of the Royal Guelphic Order in 1831, and by 1852 had arrived at the rank of lieutenant general and the dignity of Knight Commander of the Order of the Bath In 1850 he was appointed Adjutant-General to the Forces, but following the appointment of Lord Hardinge to the post of commander-in-chief, Brown left the Horse Guards in 1853.

In 1854, on the despatch of a British force to the East, Sir George Brown was appointed to command the Light Division. This he led in action, and administered in camp, on Peninsular principles, and, whilst preserving the strictest discipline to a degree which came in for criticism, he made himself beloved by his men. At Alma he had a horse shot under him. At Inkerman he was wounded whilst leading the French Zouaves into action. In the following year, when an expedition against Kertch and the Russian communications was decided upon, Brown went in command of the British contingent. He was invalided home on the day of Lord Raglan's death (29 June 1855). He was later promoted general, backdated to 7 September 1855. From March 1860 to March 1865 he was appointed Commander-in-Chief, Ireland and was the colonel-commandant of the 2nd Battalion Rifle Brigade from 1855 to 1863.

Honours included CB in 1838, a KCB in 1852, a GCB in 1855, and a Knight of the Royal Guelphic Order (KH).

He died at his birthplace of Linkwood in 1865.

== Honorary appointments ==
- Colonel of the 77th (East Middlesex) Regiment of Foot (1851–1854)
- Colonel of the 7th (Derbyshire) Regiment of Foot (1854–1855)
- Colonel of the 32nd (The Cornwall) Regiment of Foot (Light Infantry) (1863–1865)
- Colonel-in-Chief of The Prince Consort's Own Rifle Brigade (1863–1865)

Military offices
Preceded by Sir John Macdonald	Adjutant General; 1850–1853	Succeeded by Sir George Cathcart
Preceded by Sir John Macleod	Colonel of the 77th Regiment of Foot; 1851–1854	Succeeded by Sir George Goldie
Preceded by Sir Edward Blakeney	Colonel of the 7th (Royal Fusiliers) Regiment of Foot; 1854–1855	Succeeded by Samuel Auchmuty
Preceded by Sir Harry Smith	Colonel-Commandant of the 2nd Battalion, The Prince Consort's Own Rifle Brigade; 1855–1863	Succeeded by Sir Charles Yorke
Preceded by The Lord Seaton	Commander-in-Chief, Ireland; 1860–1865	Succeeded by The Lord Strathnairn
Preceded by The Viscount Melville	Colonel of the 32nd (The Cornwall) Regiment of Foot (Light Infantry); 1863–1865	Succeeded by William George Gold
Preceded by The Lord Seaton	Colonel-in-Chief of The Prince Consort's Own Rifle Brigade; 1863–1865	Succeeded by Sir Edward Blakeney
