= Sir William Erskine, 2nd Baronet =

British Army general

Major-General Sir William Erskine Bt
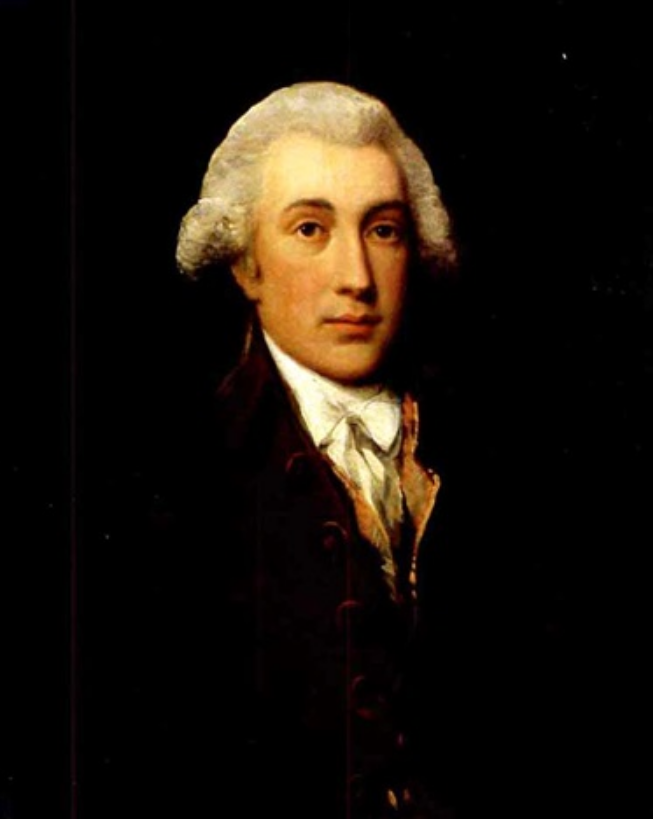
- Erskine as a major

Member of Parliament for Fife
- In office 1796–1806

Personal details
- Born: 30 March 1770
- Died: 15 May 1813 (aged 43) Lisbon
- Cause of death: Suicide
- Relations: Sir William Erskine, 1st Baronet (father)

Military service
- Allegiance: United Kingdom
- Branch/service: British Army
- Years of service: 1785–1813
- Rank: Major-General
- Commands: 15th Light Dragoons; Brigade, Corunna; Brigade, Walcheren; Brigade, 1st Division; 5th Division; Cavalry Division; Light Division; 2nd Cavalry Division
- Battles/wars: French Revolutionary Wars; Flanders campaign; Battle of Villers-en-Cauchies; Napoleonic Wars; Walcheren campaign; Peninsular War; Retreat to Corunna; Battle of Pombal; Battle of Redinha; Battle of Casal Novo; Battle of Sabugal; Battle of Fuentes de Oñoro; Blockade of Almeida; Battle of Arroyo dos Molinos; Battle of Almaraz

Major-General Sir William Erskine, 2nd Baronet (30 March 1770 – 15 May 1813) was an officer in the British Army, served as a member of Parliament, and achieved important commands in the Napoleonic Wars under the Duke of Wellington, but ended his service in insanity and suicide.

He was the eldest son of Lieutenant-General Sir William Erskine, 1st Baronet and his second wife, Frances. He succeeded to the baronetcy on his father's death in 1795.

== Early career ==
Erskine was commissioned into the 23rd foot 1785, and transferred to the 5th Dragoons as a lieutenant in 1787, and in 1791 became captain of the 15th King's Light Dragoons (the unit his father had served in with distinction) on 23 February 1791. His first active service was in Flanders 1793–95, during the French Revolutionary Wars, when he acted as aide-de-camp to his father. In 1794 he was made lieutenant-colonel. and fought at the Battle of Villers-en-Cauchies, where a handful of English and Austrian cavalry routed a much larger force of French infantry and cavalry.

On his father's death in 1795, Erskine became baronet. He represented Fife in Parliament in 1796 and 1802–1805. Despite being "blind as a beetle", according to a fellow officer, in 1808, Erskine received promotion to major general. When he heard Erskine was being shipped to Portugal, Wellington complained that he "generally understood him to be a madman." The administrators of the army at Horse Guards responded that, "No doubt he is sometimes a little mad, but in his lucid intervals he is an uncommonly clever fellow; and I trust he will have no fit during the campaign, though he looked a little wild as he embarked."

== Peninsular War ==
During the 1811 campaign in Portugal, Erskine took over the command of the famous Light Division in the absence of Robert Craufurd. He soon developed a reputation for rashness. Wellington wrote, "It is impossible to trust to his judgment in any critical case."

While pursuing Marshal Andre Massena's retreating French army, several sharp actions were fought at Pombal, Redinha, Casal Novo and Foz do Arouce between the Light Division and Marshal Michel Ney's rearguard. At Casal Novo on 14 March 1811, Erskine advanced his men along the main road in fog without proper scouts. When the fog suddenly cleared, his leading elements found themselves facing elements of Jean Marchand's division deployed in line with artillery support. This carelessness cost the Light Division 155 killed and wounded, while Marchand lost only 55 men.

At the Battle of Sabugal, the fog and Erskine's bungling saved General Jean Reynier's isolated French corps from destruction. Wellington assigned Erskine with the Light Division and some cavalry to cut in behind Reynier's open left flank while four divisions attacked in front. The hapless Erskine, who was very nearsighted, issued a set of foolish orders then promptly got lost in the fog with the cavalry, allowing the French to escape from Wellington's trap.

During the Battle of Fuentes de Oñoro, Erskine's 5th and Alexander Campbell's 6th Divisions covered the Siege of Almeida. After the French relief army was turned back, the French garrison slipped out of the fortress in the night and marched straight through the blockading force to freedom. On this occasion, an exasperated Wellington said, "I have never been so distressed by any military event as by the escape of even a man of them." This time Erskine was only one of several officers who blundered. Aware that he could not dismiss Erskine because of the man's political influence, Wellington tried to place Erskine in positions where he could do little damage.

From 19 June 1811, Erskine led four mounted regiments in the newly organized 2nd Cavalry Division in Rowland Hill's corps. He soon relinquished command, but reassumed his post on 8 April 1812. Soon after, he was declared insane and cashiered. He took his own life in Lisbon in 1813 by jumping out of a window, reportedly with the last words, "Now why did I do that?"

== Footnotes ==
Parliament of Great Britain
Preceded by William Wemyss	Member of Parliament for Fife; 1796 – 1800	Succeeded by Parliament of the United Kingdom
Parliament of the United Kingdom
Preceded by Parliament of Great Britain	Member of Parliament for Fife; 1801 – 1806	Succeeded by Robert Ferguson
Baronetage of Great Britain
Preceded by William Erskine	Baronet (of Torrie); 1795–1813	Succeeded by James Erskine
