= Miguel Pereira Forjaz, 10th Count of Feira =

Portuguese General

His Lordship The Count of Feira
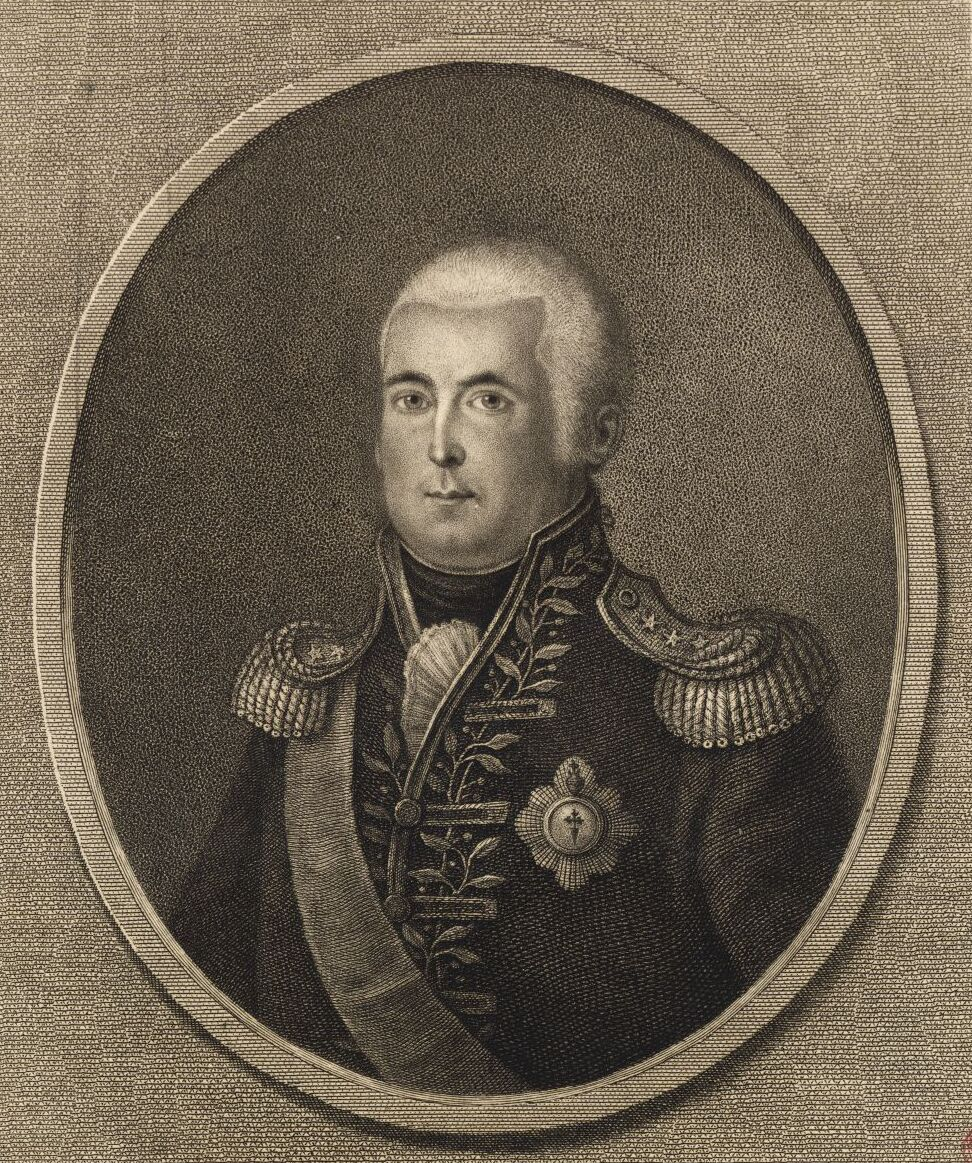
- Born: 1 November 1769; Ponte de Lima, Portugal
- Died: 6 November 1827 (aged 58); Portugal
- Military career
- Allegiance: Portugal
- Service years: 1785–1820
- Rank: Lieutenant-General
- Conflicts: War of the Pyrenees; War of the Oranges; Peninsular War

D. Miguel Pereira Forjaz Coutinho, 10th Count of Feira (1 November 1769 – 6 November 1827) was a Portuguese general and War Secretary in the Peninsular War.

== Life ==
He was the son of Diogo Pereira Forjaz Coutinho (born 23 May 1726) and the great grandson of the 9th Count of Feira, D. Álvaro Pereira Forjaz Coutinho (c.1656–?) and his wife Inês Antónia Barreto de Sá (c.1670–?). He was married twice, to Joana Eulália Freire de Andrade and to Maria do Patrocínio Freire de Andrade e Castro who died at childbirth.

He entered the army in 1785, as a cadet in the Regiment of Peniche, in which he met many members of his family. In 1787 he was promoted to alferes (lieutenant) and served as chief of staff to the Count of Oeynhausen, inspector-general of the Infantry, fighting alongside him at Porcalhota in 1790. He was promoted to captain in 1791 and to major (sargento-mor) in 1793, and was made adjutant to General Forbes, commander of the Portuguese division then fighting in Roussillon and Catalonia.

Having been promoted to colonel, in March 1800 he was appointed governor and captain-general of Pará, but did not set out for Brazil. In the War of the Oranges, the following year, he served as quartermaster-general (chief of staff) to General Forbes in the Alentejo. In 1806 he was promoted to brigadier and appointed inspector general of the army. On the royal family's flight to the Portuguese colony of Brazil in 1807, he became deputy secretary of the government, to replace, if necessary, the Count of Sampaio.

When General Junot took over the government of the country, Forjaz withdrew to the provinces. At Coimbra he began the revolt against the French and went to Porto, where he reorganised the army, under the orders of his cousin Bernardim Freire de Andrade. Accompanying Andrade as adjutant general of the army of the north on their march on Porto-Lisbon, Pereira was made secretary of the Regency, after the Convention of Sintra, and was given the war and foreign affairs portfolios. He remained the Regency's executive official for military matters until 1820. In this capacity he took part in the reorganisation of the army under William Carr Beresford (who had been appointed commander-in-chief by the Portuguese Royal family), completing the implementation of the 1803 proposals in 1807. One of his initiatives was the creation, towards the end of 1808, of six new battalions of Caçadores in the north of the country and supporting Beresford in adapting the Portuguese Army to British training and tactics to better help the Anglo-Portuguese Army's campaign during the Peninsular War. In 1815 he successfully opposed sending a Portuguese division to fight in the Low Countries against Napoleon during the Hundred Days.

With the Liberal Revolution of 1820 he left his post as regent and retired from public life. In 1826 he received the title of Count of Feira and was elected a Peer of the Kingdom on the occasion of the giving of the Constitutional Charter by Peter IV of Portugal.

== Promotions and units ==
Rank	Unit	Date
Member	Council of War	24 July 1825
Lieutenant General		1812
Governor	Kingdom	2 January 1809
Secretary of the Regency	Affairs of the Navy and War	2 January 1809
Major General		1808
Inspector General	Militias	9 December 1806
Brigadier		9 December 1806
Interim Inspector General	Militias	11 August 1803
Colonel		5 June 1798
Lieutenant Colonel	22nd Infantry Regiment of Serpa	17 December 1795
Captain	10th Company, 13th Infantry Regiment of Peniche	22 June 1793
Captain graduated	13th Infantry Regiment of Peniche	24 September 1791
Adjutant	13th Infantry Regiment of Peniche	27 February 1790
Ensign	5th Company, 13th Infantry Regiment of Peniche	27 April 1787
Cadet	13th Infantry Regiment of Peniche	1785

== Bibliography ==
- (in Portuguese) FURTADO, Gregório de Mendonça (1809). Ordenança de Campanha destinada às Tropas Ligeiras e aos Officiaes que servem nos pòstos avançados, Impressão Régia, Lisbon
- (in Portuguese) MARTELO, David (2007). Caçadores. Os Galos de Combate do Exército de Wellington, Tribuna (editor), Lisbon
