= Blockade of Almeida =

1811 blockade during the Peninsular War

- Part of Peninsular War
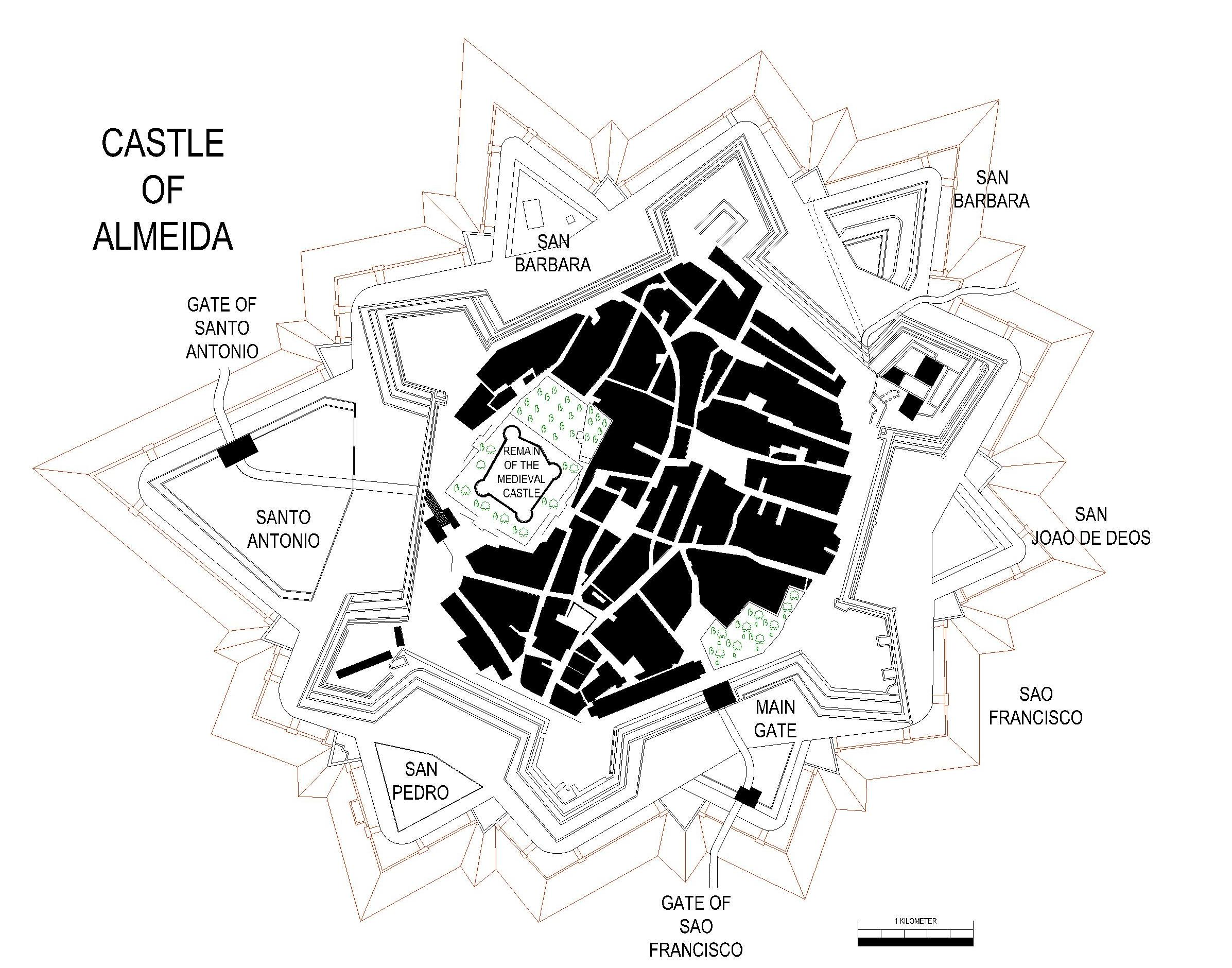
- Castle Fortress of Almeida in Portugal
Date	14 April to 10 May 1811
Location	Almeida, Portugal 40°43′N 6°54′W
Result	Inconclusive

Belligerents
France	United Kingdom (Kingdom of Portugal) Portugal

Commanders and leaders
(First French Empire) Antoine Brenier	(United Kingdom of Great Britain and Ireland) William Erskine (United Kingdom of Great Britain and Ireland) Alexander Campbell (Kingdom of Portugal) Luís do Rego

Strength
1,400	13,000

Casualties and losses
360	50

Peninsular War:
Third French invasion
The color black indicates the current battle.

In the Blockade of Almeida (14 April – 10 May 1811) a French garrison under Antoine François Brenier de Montmorand was surrounded by approximately 13,000 Anglo-Allied soldiers led by Generals Sir Alexander Campbell, 1st Baronet and Sir William Erskine, 2nd Baronet.

After a French relief attempt failed, Brenier and his troops broke out at night after blowing up portions of the fortress. To the fury of the British army commander Arthur Wellesley, Viscount Wellington, most of the French escaped due to their commander's single-minded determination, British fumbling, and remarkably good luck. The action took place during the Peninsular War portion of the Napoleonic Wars. Almeida, Portugal is located near the Spanish border about 300 kilometres (186 mi) northeast of Lisbon. The town was originally captured from a Portuguese garrison during the 1810 Siege of Almeida.

== Background ==
On 11 October 1810, Marshal André Masséna's French army found itself confronted by the elaborately built and well-defended Lines of Torres Vedras in its invasion of Portugal. Foiled by the virtually impregnable defenses, the French commander halted to wait for reinforcements. Unable to secure enough food, the French army wasted away from starvation and illness. By 1 January 1811, the 65,000-strong army had shrunk to 46,500. Massena reluctantly retreated from Portugal beginning on 6 March. The British army of Viscount Wellington beat the French II Corps of General of Division Jean Reynier at the Battle of Sabugal on 3 April 1811. The next day, the British invested the fortress of Almeida.

After Marshal André Masséna's retreat from Portugal, the French installed a garrison of 1,400 men under Brenier in the fortress. These troops were blockaded in the town by forces under Arthur Wellesley, 1st Duke of Wellington. Since the Anglo-Portuguese Army had no heavy guns to breach the walls, they were forced to starve the garrison out. Because of this, this operation was technically a blockade rather than a siege.

From 3 to 5 May 1811, Masséna failed to relieve Almeida in the Battle of Fuentes de Oñoro. During this time, the blockade was maintained by Major General William Erskine's 5th and Major General Alexander Campbell's 6th Divisions, plus Count Barbacena's 300-man Portuguese cavalry brigade. Campbell guarded the south and west sides of the fortress with too many soldiers and placed his men too far from the city. Though instructed by Wellington to block the Barba del Puerco bridge on the afternoon of the 10th, Erskine neglected to forward the necessary orders in time.

== Escape ==
With great skill, Brenier slipped his men through the Anglo-Portuguese lines on the night of 10–11 May. The fortifications were rigged with explosives and blew up after the French cleared out. After overrunning a Portuguese outpost, Brenier headed northwest toward the Barba del Puerco bridge. Campbell and Brigadier General Denis Pack gave chase with some troops, but a British colonel whose regiment was stationed near the breakthrough failed to pursue. Another regiment arrived at the Barba del Puerco, but since the French had not gotten there yet, the unit marched to another location. The French were intercepted just as they reached the bridge and numbers of them were killed or captured. A total of 360 Frenchmen became casualties during the night. An unwise attempt by the 36th Foot Regiment to storm the bridge was repelled with 35 casualties by the French 31st Light Infantry Regiment from Reynier's II Corps.

An enraged Wellington later wrote,

They had about 13,000 to watch 1,400. There they were all sleeping in their spurs even; but the French got off. I begin to be of the opinion that there is nothing on earth so stupid as a gallant officer.

== Aftermath ==
The failed blockade occurred at the end of the third Portuguese campaign, which had begun the following year with the French capture of Almeida. The campaign had now concluded with the French retreat out of Portugal, reversing all of their territorial changes.

Fortresses like Almeida would be critical as the wider war entered a stalemate in the western theatre as both sides would manoeuvre for position attempting to secure other key border fortresses such as at Badajoz and Ciudad Rodrigo. Only once these were secured would the Anglo-Portuguese army be able to influence events in the wider Iberian theatre.

== Notes ==
Preceded by Battle of Sabugal	Napoleonic Wars; Blockade of Almeida	Succeeded by Battle of Fuentes de Oñoro
