= Buenos Ayres =

Village in Trinidad and Tobago

- village
- Location within Trinidad and Tobago
- Coordinates: 10.098225°N 61.679983°W
- Country: Trinidad and Tobago
- Borough: Siparia

Population (2011)
  - Total: 430

Buenos Ayres is a village in Trinidad and Tobago. It is located in southwestern Trinidad, north of Erin and southeast of Point Fortin. Buenos Ayres is the hometown of the calypsonian Cro Cro. The Erin Savannas, one of the last remaining natural savannas in Trinidad and Tobago, is located just east of Buenos Ayres.

== Climate ==
The area has a relatively rare tropical monsoon climate, occasionally also known as a tropical wet climate or tropical monsoon and trade-wind littoral climate. The Köppen Climate Classification subtype for this climate is "Am" (tropical monsoon climate).

Climate data for Buenos Ayres
| Month | Jan | Feb | Mar | Apr | May | Jun | Jul | Aug | Sep | Oct | Nov | Dec | Year |
|---|---|---|---|---|---|---|---|---|---|---|---|---|---|
| Mean daily maximum °C (°F) | 28 (83) | 29 (84) | 29 (85) | 30 (86) | 30 (86) | 29 (85) | 29 (84) | 29 (85) | 30 (86) | 29 (85) | 29 (84) | 29 (84) | 29 (85) |
| Mean daily minimum °C (°F) | 24 (75) | 24 (75) | 24 (76) | 26 (78) | 26 (79) | 26 (78) | 26 (78) | 26 (78) | 26 (78) | 26 (78) | 25 (77) | 24 (76) | 25 (77) |
| Average precipitation cm (inches) | 5.1 (2) | 6.9 (2.7) | 8.6 (3.4) | 5.8 (2.3) | 8.6 (3.4) | 12 (4.6) | 19 (7.6) | 13 (5.2) | 14 (5.5) | 17 (6.6) | 11 (4.4) | 15 (5.8) | 59 (23.4) |
Source: Weatherbase
