= Light Division =

The Light Division
- Active: 1803–1815; 1853–1856; 1914–1918; 1968–2007; 2022–present
- Country: United Kingdom
- Branch: British Army
- Type: Light Infantry
- Size: Division
- Garrison/HQ: Sir John Moore Barracks, Winchester
- Anniversaries: Salamanca Day
- Equipment: Baker rifle
- Engagements: Battle of Copenhagen (1807); Peninsular War; Battle of Corunna; Battle of the River Côa; Battle of Bussaco; Battle of Sabugal; Battle of Fuentes de Onoro; Siege of Ciudad Rodrigo; Siege of Badajoz (1812); Battle of Salamanca; Battle of Vitoria; Battle of the Pyrenees; Battle of Nivelle; Battle of Toulouse; Crimean War; Battle of Alma; Siege of Sevastopol (1854–1855); Battle of Inkerman

Commanders
- Notable commanders: Robert Craufurd; William Erskine; Charles Alten; George Brown

The Light Division is a light infantry division of the British Army. It was reformed in 2022, as part of Future Soldier reforms.

Its origins lay in "Light Companies" formed during the late 18th century, to move at speed over inhospitable terrain and protect a main force with skirmishing tactics. These units took advantage of then-new technology in the form of rifles, which allowed them to emphasise marksmanship, and were tasked primarily with disrupting and harassing enemy forces in skirmishes before the main forces clashed.

Formed in 1803, during the Napoleonic Wars, the Light Division was raised thereafter: during the Crimean War, the First World War, from 1968 to 2007, and from 2022 to the present day. Some light infantry units remained and remain outside of the Light Division.

== Origins of the Light Division ==
The British Army's first three "Rifle Battalion" was raised by the 60th (Royal Americans) in 1797–99. The command of this first rifle battalion was given to Francis de Rottenburg, who had extensive experience with light infantry. While the 60th did not officially become part of the Light Division, it and Rottenburg were influential in terms of British Army doctrine regarding rifle-armed light infantry.

In 1800, an "Experimental Corps of Riflemen", was raised by Colonel Coote Manningham and Lieutenant-Colonel the Hon. William Stewart – drawn from officers and other ranks from drafts of a variety of British regiments. The corps differed in several regards from the Line infantry of the British Army. Most significantly, it was armed with the formidable Baker rifle, which was more accurate and of longer range than the musket, although it took longer to load. As the rifle was shorter than the musket, it was issued with a 21-inch sword bayonet. Riflemen wore dark green jackets rather than the bright red coats of the British line infantry regiments of that time; pantaloons, rather than breeches; black leather facings and belts rather than white and; a green plume on their "stovepipe shakoes". They were trained to work alone or in pairs, in open order and to think for themselves.

== Napoleonic Wars ==
Four months after its formation, the Rifle Corps was judged ready for its first operation. On 25 August 1800, three companies, under the command of Lieutenant-Colonel William Stewart, spearheaded a British amphibious landing at Ferrol, Spain, where the Rifles helped to dislodge the Spanish defenders on the heights. However the expedition was defeated and withdrew the following day. In 1801, one company of the corps, under the command of Captain Sidney Beckwith, served as marksmen aboard Royal Navy ships at the First Battle of Copenhagen. During the battle, the Rifle Corps suffered one lieutenant killed, its first officer to fall, and two other ranks killed and six wounded, some of whom died later. (In 1847 the Admiralty made the Naval General Service Medal with the clasp "Copenhagen 1801" claimable by surviving veterans, including members of the Rifle Corps.)

In January 1803, the corps became an established regular regiment and was renamed the 95th Regiment of Foot (Rifles).

On 17 July 1803, an unofficial "Corps of Light Infantry" was formed, by brigading together the

- 43rd (Monmouthshire Light Infantry) Regiment, the
- 52nd (Oxfordshire) Regiment of Foot (Light Infantry) and the
- 95th Regiment.

(The name "Light Division" was not used until several years later.)

General Sir John Moore finished training the 43rd, 52nd, and 95th in September 1805.

Because the three Rifle battalions of the 60th Royal Americans were already wearing the green clothing and black leather equipment that were typical of continental light infantry, the 95th Rifles adopted the same uniform as the 60th. But despite the best efforts of Moore, the other light infantry regiments were ordered to conform to the regulations for light companies of line regiments by retaining their red jackets.

Armed with the Baker rifle and wearing dark green uniforms, the Green Jackets were hard to spot and spent their time sniping at enemy officers, NCOs and any other figure of authority in an enemy formation. A well-aimed shot could bring down an enemy commander with ease, lowering morale in the enemy. The Baker Rifle had far greater accuracy and range than the standard muskets of the time and the men using them were considered marksmen, trading devastating firepower for superior accuracy and range.

In 1807, Denmark while officially neutral, was suspected by the British of planning to ally itself with France. The corps of light infantry (43rd, 52nd and 95th Regiments) led by Sir Arthur Wellesley, the future Duke of Wellington, was part of a force that defeated Danish forces at the Siege of Køge and Second Battle of Copenhagen, and with it the entire Danish fleet.

The Corps of Light Infantry, under Moore, sailed for Spain for what would become known as the Peninsular War. The campaign established the value of light infantry armed with rifles.

Four further battalions were trained by Rottenberg in the Curragh of Kildare in Ireland during May 1808. Later, Rottenberg returned to England and, at Brabdourn Lees barracks in Ashford, retrained the 68th, 85th and 71st Regiments as light infantry, to help meet the demand for such troops in the Peninsula.

During the Peninsular war of 1808–1809, Caçadores Battalions of the Portuguese Army were attached to the Light Division.

=== Battle of Corunna ===
The Battle of Corunna, (16 January 1809), was an attack by 16,000 French under Marshal Soult during the amphibious evacuation of 16,000 British under General Sir John Moore. Moore had hoped to draw the French Army away from Portugal, to allow the small British force in that country to be reinforced, and to allow the Spanish armies to reform. Hugely outnumbered, Moore was forced to retreat. Made in a harsh winter and under constant pressure, the retreat severely tried his men. The exhausting marches, cold weather and frequent skirmishes with the pursuing French units saw many fall to illness or exhaustion, or to turn to alcohol and become so drunk that they were left behind. The Light Division (then the Light Brigade) was one of the few units that kept its discipline and, along with units of British cavalry, fought a series of rearguard actions against the French. The brigade then fought at Corunna where the French were repulsed. It was then sent to Vigo for embarkation.

Thomas Plunket was a rifleman in the 95th Rifles. During the retreat Plunket shot the French Brigade-general Auguste-Marie-François Colbert at a range of between 200 and 600 metres using a Baker rifle. Plunket had run forward to make this shot, and before returning to his own lines he reloaded, and shot a trumpet-major who had rushed to the aid of the fallen general. This second feat showed that the first shot had not been a fluke, and the deaths were sufficient to throw the pending French attack into disarray. The shots were at a sufficiently long distance to impress others in the 95th Rifles, whose marksmanship (with the Baker rifle) was far better than the ordinary British soldier who, armed with a Brown Bess musket, was trained to shoot into a body of men at 50 metres with volley fire.

=== Battle of Talavera ===
While reforming in England after their evacuation from Corunna, Brigadier-General Robert Craufurd was ordered to take his brigade, now composed of the 1st Battalion of the 43rd, 1st Battalion of the 52nd and 1st Battalion of the 95th, back to the Peninsula. The brigade landed at Lisbon on 2 July 1809 and embarked on a series of grueling marches in the July heat to join Arthur Wellesley, 1st Duke of Wellington's army. Wellesley fought and won the battle while the Light Brigade was still pouring sweat on the road, although at times it averaged 30 miles per day. The Riflemen of the 60th performed sterling service in their absence, being one of the few regiments mentioned by name in Wellesley's dispatch to the British government. During the reorganizations that followed, Craufurd was given command of the 3rd Division, whose previous commander, Major-General Mackenzie, had been killed at Talavera. With the subsequent addition of Captain Hew Ross's troop of Royal Horse Artillery, the 1st Hussars of the K.G.L. and the Portuguese 3rd Caçadores Battalion (commanded by Lieutenant-Colonel George Elder), this became the Light Division.' Craufurd also wrote the first Standing Orders for the Light Division, a training manual and handbook.

=== Battle of the River Côa ===
Craufurd's operations on the Côa and Águeda in 1810 were daring to the point of rashness; the drawing on of the French forces into what became the Battle of the River Côa (24 July 1810), in particular was a rare lapse in judgement that almost saw his removal from command. Although Wellington censured him for his conduct, he at the same time increased his force to a full division by the addition of two picked battalions of Portuguese Caçadores, Chestnut troop, Royal Horse Artillery (RHA) & part of the 14th & 16th, Light Dragoons

=== Battle of Bussaco ===
The Battle of Bussaco, (27 September 1810) was a defensive battle won by the Allies which allowed Wellington to resume the retreat of his army into the previously fortified Lines of Torres Vedras. He reached these by 10 October. Finding the lines too strong to attack, the French withdrew into winter quarters. Deprived of food and harried by British hit-and-run tactics, the French lost 25,000 men captured or dead from starvation or sickness before they retreated into Spain early in 1811, freeing Portugal from French occupation except for Almeida, near the frontier. During the retreat, the Battle of Sabugal was also fought.

=== Battle of Sabugal ===
The Battle of Sabugal (3 April 1811), Craufurd had taken ill and was home in England so the Division was under the command of Major-General William Erskine, the plan was for the Light Division and two brigades of cavalry to circle behind the French open left flank while the other four divisions attacked the front. On the day of the battle there was a heavy fog, the other commanders decided to wait until visibility improved. Undeterred, Erskine ordered Lieut-Colonel Thomas Sydney Beckwith's 1st Brigade forward. Instead of crossing the Côa beyond the French, the brigade drifted to the left in the fog, crossed at the wrong location and struck the French left flank. Erskine, who was very nearsighted and mentally unbalanced, then became cautious and issued explicit instructions to Colonel George Drummond not to support his fellow brigade commander. At this point, Erskine rode off to join the cavalry, leaving the Light Division leaderless for the rest of the battle. The French switched most of their 10,000-man corps against Beckwith's 1,500 and pressed the light infantry back. When Drummond heard the sounds of battle approaching, he deduced that Beckwith's men were retreating. Disobeying orders, Drummond led his 2nd Brigade across the Côa and joined Beckwith. Together they drove the French back.

=== Battle of Fuentes De Onoro ===
At the Battle of Fuentes de Onoro (3 May 1811) the 51st Foot and 85th Light Infantry, along with the Light Division demonstrated how the French Cavalry could be beaten by a combination of rapid movements, accurate rifle fire and disciplined formations. During the battle the Light Division was sent to reinforce the 51st and 85th Light Infantry, who had been caught in open ground and surrounded by French Cavalry. When reinforced, the whole force was able to retire rapidly – chased by the French cavalry. Whenever the French came close, the light infantrymen, riflemen and caçadores, rapidly formed squares at the last safe moment, beating off the cavalry. This series of rapid moves, combined with the disciplined forming of squares – off the line of march, was a spectacle that few could have believed was possible.

=== Siege of Ciudad Rodrigo ===
The Division, now once again under the command of Major-General Robert Craufurd, was involved in the Siege of Ciudad Rodrigo (8 January 1812), where they stormed and took the Grand Teson redoubt. Then on 19 January together with Major-General Thomas Picton's 3rd Division they were ordered to storm the city. Picton's Division assaulting the greater breach in the northwest of the city's walls while the Light Division was sent against the lesser breach in the north.

Launched at 7 pm, the assault was completely successful, although amongst the dead were Major-Generals Henry Mackinnon and Craufurd. The victory was somewhat marred when the British rank and file thoroughly sacked the city, despite the efforts of their officers.

=== Battle of Salamanca ===
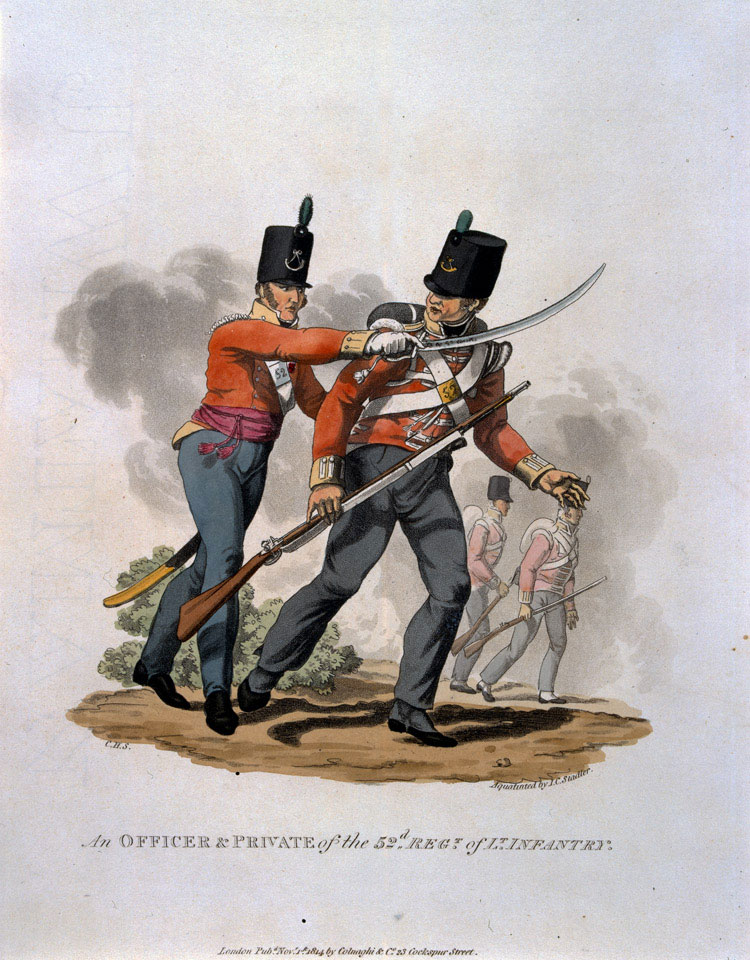
1812 illustration of an officer and private of the 52nd Regiment of Foot

Following on from the Siege of Ciudad Rodrigo and the death of Crauford the Division now under the command of Charles Alten, was held as the reserve division for the Battle of Salamanca (22 July 1812) and did not take a major part in the fighting.

=== Battle of Vitoria ===
At the Battle of Vitoria (21 June 1813), the division was part of the Right Center Column under Wellington's personal direction. Wellington launched his attack in four columns, and after hard fighting the enemy's centre was broken and soon the French defence crumbled. About 5,000 French soldiers were killed or wounded and 3,000 were taken prisoner, while Wellington's forces suffered about 5,000 killed or wounded. 152 cannons were captured, but King Joseph Bonaparte narrowly escaped. The battle led to the collapse of Napoleonic rule in Spain.

=== Battle of the Pyrenees ===
During the French withdrawal across the Pyrenees and into France the Light Division was involved in the Battle of the Pyrenees (25 July 1813) and the Battle of the Bidassoa (7 October 1813), during which the toughest fighting of the day occurred in Major General Bertrand Clausel's center sector. John Colborne's brigade of Charles Alten's Light Division attacked La Bayonette. Not waiting for the attack, the French charged downhill and drove back the 95th Rifles. Suddenly the 52nd appeared and quickly turned the tables. Following closely behind the retreating French, they overran the redoubt with surprising ease. Meanwhile, James Kempt's second Light Division brigade and Francisco de Longa's Spanish division attacked up two spurs of Mont Larroun to secure some positions. The next day the French abandoned the position to avoid encirclement.

=== Battle of Nivelle ===
The Battle of Nivelle (10 November 1813), started just before dawn as the Light Division headed towards the plateau on the summit of the Greater Rhune (the summit had been garrisoned by French troops but they had fled after the skirmish on the River Bidassoa, fearing to be cut off from their own army). The objective of the division was to sweep the three defensive forts constructed by the French out of the battle. They moved down into the ravine in front of the Lesser Rhune and were ordered to lie down and await the order to attack. After the signal from a battery of cannon, the offensive began. It started with the 43rd, 52nd and 95th – with the Portuguese Caçadores in support, storming the redoubts on the crest of the Rhune. Despite this being a risky move and the men being almost exhausted, the surprise and boldness of the British sent the French fleeing towards other forts on other hills.

While the 43rd and 95th were dealing with the French on the Rhune, there still remained one very strong star-shaped fort below on the Mouiz plateau which reached out towards the coast. This was attacked by Colborne's 52nd, supported by riflemen from the 95th. Once again, the French were surprised and the British succeeded. They had, in the French eyes, appeared from the ground at which point, in danger of being cut off, the French soldiers quickly fled leaving Colborne in possession of the fort and other trenches without loss of a single fatal casualty.

=== Battle of Toulouse ===
The final action of the Peninsula War was the Battle of Toulouse, (10 April 1814), In the evening of 10 April 1814, Marshall Soult, received an official communiqué from Paris informing him that Napoleon had surrendered to the Coalition forces in northern France. Unsure of what to do, Soult's generals advised him to surrender the city, as reinforcements were unlikely to arrive and further news reached Toulouse informing Soult of the surrender of French armies across France. This ended the Peninsula War.

Claimed to be one of the strongest divisions in the British army in the Peninsula War, the Light Division proved its tough nature in the numerous actions it had been involved in from the infamous retreat to Corunna right up until the invasion of France in 1814 and the conclusion of the war at the Battle of Toulouse.

=== Structure during the Peninsular War ===
- Commanding Generals: Robert Craufurd, William Erskine, Charles Alten
- 1st Brigade
  - 1/43rd (Monmouthshire Light Infantry) Regiment
  - 1/95th Rifles
  - 3/95th Rifles (HQ & 5 companies)
  - 3rd Portuguese Caçadores.
- 2nd Brigade
  - 1/52nd (Oxfordshire) Regiment of Foot (Light Infantry)
  - 2/95th Rifles
  - 1/17th Portuguese Line
  - 2/17th Portuguese Line
  - 1st Portuguese Caçadores.
- Divisional Troops
  - Ross' Troop, Royal Horse Artillery
  - Part of the 14th Light Dragoons
  - Part of the 16th Light Dragoons

== Waterloo ==
After the abdication of Napoleon in 1814 and his exile to the island of Elba, the Peninsula army was dismantled and divided. Following Napoleon's escape and return to power in France, there was one more battle to fight.

A Light Division by name was not formed for Waterloo but the Light Infantry battalions, excepting the 1st battalion of the 95th which was assigned to the 5th Division, were massed into the 3rd British Brigade assigned to the 2nd Division. The 3rd Brigade was commanded by then Major-General Frederick Adam. The other brigades were foreign troops with the 1st Brigade consisting of 4 line battalions of the Kings German Legion and 3rd Brigade consisting of four battalions of Hanoverian Landwehr (militia). Since the British army had so few light troops, 16 of 21 light infantry battalions in the Allied Army at Waterloo came from allied forces. The 3rd British Division, for example, had over 2,300 light infantry in King's German Legion and Hanoverian battalions.

The final action of the day saw Sir John Colborne bring the 52nd Light Infantry round to outflank the Old Guard, of the French Imperial Guard as it advanced towards the British centre in a last-ditch attempt to defeat Wellington. As the column passed his brigade, the 52nd charged, fired a destructive volley into the left flank of the Chasseurs and attacked with the bayonet. The whole of the Guard was driven back down the hill and began a general retreat to the cry of "La Garde recule"

After their unsuccessful attack on the British centre, The French Imperial Guard made a last stand in squares on either side of the La Belle Alliance. The 3rd (Light) Brigade charged the square which was formed on rising ground to the (British) right of La Belle Alliance and again threw them into a state of confusion. The other square was attacked by the Prussians. The French retreated away from the battle field towards France.

=== Structure at Waterloo ===
- 2nd (Light) Brigade
  - 52nd (Oxfordshire) Regiment of Foot (Light Infantry), (the biggest battalion at Waterloo)
  - 71st (Glasgow Highland) Regiment of Foot (Light Infantry)
  - 2nd Battalion, 95th Rifles
  - Detachment, 3rd Battalion, 95th Rifles
- 1st Brigade, King's German Legion
  - 1st Line Battalion, KGL
  - 2nd Line Battalion, KGL
  - 3rd Line Battalion, KGL
  - 4th Line Battalion, KGL
- 3rd Hanoverian Brigade
  - Landwehr Battalion Bremervörde
  - Landwehr Battalion 2nd Duke of York's (Osnabrück)
  - Landwehr Battalion 3rd Duke of York's (Quakenbrück)
  - Landwehr Battalion Salzgitter

== Crimean War ==
The Crimean War (1853–1856) was fought between Imperial Russia on one side and an alliance of France, the United Kingdom, the Kingdom of Sardinia, and the Ottoman Empire on the other. Most of the conflict took place on the Crimean Peninsula, with additional actions occurring in western Turkey, and the Baltic Sea region and is sometimes considered to be the first "modern" conflict and "introduced technical changes which affected the future course of warfare."

A Light Division was again formed for service, but this was in name only as no light infantry battalions were assigned to it. The division was involved in the Battle of the Alma (20 September 1854), which is usually considered the first battle of the Crimean War, took place in the vicinity of the River Alma in the Crimea. An Anglo-French force under General St. Arnaud and Lord Raglan defeated General Menshikov's Russian army, which lost around 6,000 troops. They were also engaged in the Siege of Sevastopol (1854–1855), and the Battle of Inkerman (5 November 1854) before the end of hostilities.

=== Structure during the Crimean War ===
- Commanding General:Lieutenant General Sir George Brown
- First Brigade:Major General William Codrington
  - 33rd Regiment of Foot
  - 23rd The Royal Welch Regiment of Fusiliers
  - 7th Regiment of Foot
- Second Brigade:Major General Sir George Buller
  - 77th (East Middlesex) Regiment of Foot
  - 88th Regiment of Foot (Connaught Rangers)
  - 19th (1st North Riding of Yorkshire) Regiment of Foot
- One troop of Royal Horse Artillery
- one field Battery Royal Artillery

By the late 19th century the concept of fighting in formation was on the wane and the distinctions between light and heavy infantry began to disappear. Essentially, all infantry became light infantry in practice. Some regiments retained the name and customs, but there was in effect no difference between them and other infantry regiments.

== World Wars ==
During the First World War two Light Divisions were formed the 14th (Light) Division (they were the first division to be attacked by Germans using flamethrowers), and the 20th (Light) Division. Both served on the Western Front and were involved in the major battles, including the Battles of the Somme, Battles of Arras and the Battles of Ypres.

Following the end of the First World War, the British formed an occupation army in Germany: British Army of the Rhine (BAOR). In February 1919, the 2nd Division was redesignated as the Light Division, and it joined the BAOR.

The British Army did not form a Light Division for service during the Second World War, with the exception of the 61st Division, which was briefly redesignated as one in the final months of the war. The ethos of the Light Division, however, was carried on in new infantry formations such as the Commandos, Parachute Regiment and the Chindits, all of whom were lightly armed and fast and agile units.

== 1968 - 2007 ==
After the Second World War the British Army had fourteen infantry depots, each bearing a letter. Infantry Depot J at Farnborough was the headquarters for the six English light infantry regiments and Infantry Depot O at Winchester was the headquarters for the two rifle regiments and the Middlesex Regiment.

In 1948, the depots adopted names and this became the Light Infantry Brigade and Green Jackets Brigade.

Then in 1968 the Light Division was reformed as an Administration Division with the regimentation of the Light Infantry Brigade and the Green Jackets Brigade.

As formed, the Light Division comprised seven regular infantry battalions:

- 1st, 2nd, 3rd and 4th Battalions, The Light Infantry
- 1st, 2nd and 3rd Battalions, The Royal Green Jackets

The Light Infantry lost its 4th Battalion in 1969, while both regiments lost a battalion in 1992.

In 2005, two further regiments were attached to the Light Division:

- 1st Battalion, The Devonshire and Dorset Light Infantry
- 1st Battalion, The Royal Gloucestershire, Berkshire and Wiltshire Light Infantry

This was in preparation for all four regiments being amalgamated into a single large regiment named The Rifles, which was formed in February 2007. Regimental names of the regiments that formed The Rifles were not maintained. As a consequence, upon the formation of The Rifles, the name Light Division was no longer to be used.

== 2022 onwards ==
In 2022, as part of the Future Soldier reforms, the Light Division was reformed to serve as one of the new divisions of infantry intended to bring all infantry regiments under an administrative division. The new Light Division was formed from a total of ten infantry battalions (7 regular army and 3 Army Reserve), plus two additional incremental companies:

- 1st Battalion, The Royal Gurkha Rifles
- 2nd Battalion, The Royal Gurkha Rifles
- F (Falklands) Company, The Royal Gurkha Rifles
- G (Coriano) Company, The Royal Gurkha Rifles
- 1st Battalion, The Rifles
- 2nd Battalion, The Rifles
- 3rd Battalion, The Rifles
- 5th Battalion, The Rifles
- 4th Battalion, Ranger Regiment
- 6th Battalion, The Rifles
- 7th Battalion, The Rifles
- 8th Battalion, The Rifles

The 4th Battalion, Ranger Regiment was formerly the 4th Battalion, The Rifles.

== Commanders ==
General Officers Commanding the Light Division
| Date from | Date to | Rank | Name | Ref. |
|---|---|---|---|---|
| 22 February 1810 | February 1811 | Brigadier-General | Robert Craufurd | |
| February 1811 | 7 March 1811 | Colonel | George Duncan Drummond | |
| 7 March 1811 | 4 May 1811 | Major-General | Sir William Erskine | |
| 4 May 1811 | 19 January 1812 | Major-General | Robert Craufurd | |
| 19 January 1812 | 19 January 1812 | Major-General | Ormsby Vandeleur | |
| 19 January 1812 | 19 January 1812 | Lieutenant-Colonel | John Colborne | |
| 19 January 1812 | 15 April 1812 | Lieutenant-Colonel | Andrew Barnard | |
| 15 April 1812 | 2 May 1812 | Major-General | Ormsby Vandeleur | |
| 2 May 1812 | June 1814 | Major-General | Charles Alten | |
| February 1854 | 5 November 1854 | Lieutenant-General | Sir George Brown | |
| 5 November 1854 | 22 February 1855 | Major-General | William Codrington | |
| 22 February 1855 | 28 June 1855 | Lieutenant-General | Sir George Brown | |
| 30 June 1855 | 11 November 1855 | Lieutenant-General | Sir William Codrington | |
| 11 November 1855 | 14 June 1856 | Major-General | Lord William Paulet | |

== Bibliography ==
- Standing Orders of the Light Division (printed in Home's Précis of Modern Tactics, pp. 257–277
- William Napier, Peninsular War, bk. xvi. ch.v.
- G. K. Rose. The Story of the 2/4th Oxfordshire and Buckinghamshire Light Infantry at Project Gutenberg
- Hibbert, Christopher, ed. (1996). The Recollections of Rifleman Harris. The Windrush Press. ISBN 0-900075-64-3.
- Keegan, John (1977). The Face of Battle. Vintage.
- Smith, Digby (1998). The Napoleonic Wars Data Book. Greenhill.
- Craufurd, Rev. Alexander H. General Craufurd and his light division. reprint Naval & Military Press 2006. ISBN 1-84574-013-0.
- Haythornthwaite, Philip (1996). Weapons & Equipment of the Napoleonic Wars. Arms and Armour. ISBN 1-85409-495-5.
- Brassey's Almanac: The Peninsular War; The Complete Companion to the Iberian Campaigns, 1807–14. Chrysalis Books Group. 2004. ISBN 1-85753-329-1.
- Nofi, Albert A. (1993). The Waterloo Campaign, June 1815. Combined Books. ISBN 0-938289-29-2.
- Johnson, Ray (1978). Napoleonic Armies, Volume II, Britain, Prussia, Austria, Russia and Their Allies. RAFM Company.
- "Memoirs of general and Flag-officers recently deceased". The United Service Magazine: Part 3. H. Colburn. 1837. p. 233–239.
- Burnham, Robert; McGuigan, Ron (2010). The British Army against Napoleon. Barnsley, South Yorkshire: Frontline Books. ISBN 978-1-84832-562-3.
- Chichester, H. M.; Falkner, James (2004). "Paulet, Lord William". Oxford Dictionary of National Biography (online ed.). Oxford University Press. (Subscription, Wikipedia Library access or UK public library membership required.)
- Heathcote, T. A. (2010). Wellington's Peninsular War Generals and their Battles. Barnsley, South Yorkshire: Pen & Sword Military. ISBN 978-1-84884-061-4.
- Accounts and Papers. Vol. 9. London: House of Commons. 1857.
- McGuigan, Ron; Burnham, Robert (2017). Wellington's Brigade Commanders. Barnsley, South Yorkshire: Pen & Sword Military. ISBN 978-1-47385-079-8.
- McGuigan, Rob (2001). Into Battle: British Orders of Battle for the Crimean War, 1854–56. Bowdon, Cheshire: Withycut House. ISBN 1-899244-02-6.
- Reid, Douglas Arthur (1911). Memories of the Crimean War. London: The St. Catherine Press.
- Reid, Stuart (2004). Wellington's Army in the Peninsular War 1809–14. Oxford: Osprey. ISBN 978-1-84176-517-4.
- Russell, William Howard (2013). The War: From the Death of Lord Raglan to the Evacuation of the Crimea. Cambridge: Cambridge University Press. ISBN 978-1-108-05194-1.
- Saunders, Tim; Yuill, Rob (2020). The Light Division in the Peninsular War 1811–1814. Barnsley, South Yorkshire: Pen & Sword Military. ISBN 978-1-52677-013-4.
- Sweetman, John (2011a). "Brown, Sir George". Oxford Dictionary of National Biography (online ed.). Oxford University Press. (Subscription, Wikipedia Library access or UK public library membership required.)
- Sweetman, John (2011b). "Codrington, Sir William John". Oxford Dictionary of National Biography (online ed.). Oxford University Press. (Subscription, Wikipedia Library access or UK public library membership required.)
- Vetch, R. H.; Stearn, Roger T. (2008). "Vandeleur, Sir John Ormsby". Oxford Dictionary of National Biography (online ed.). Oxford University Press. (Subscription, Wikipedia Library access or UK public library membership required.)
