= Battle of Fuentes de Oñoro =

1811 battle of the Peninsular War

- Part of the Peninsular War
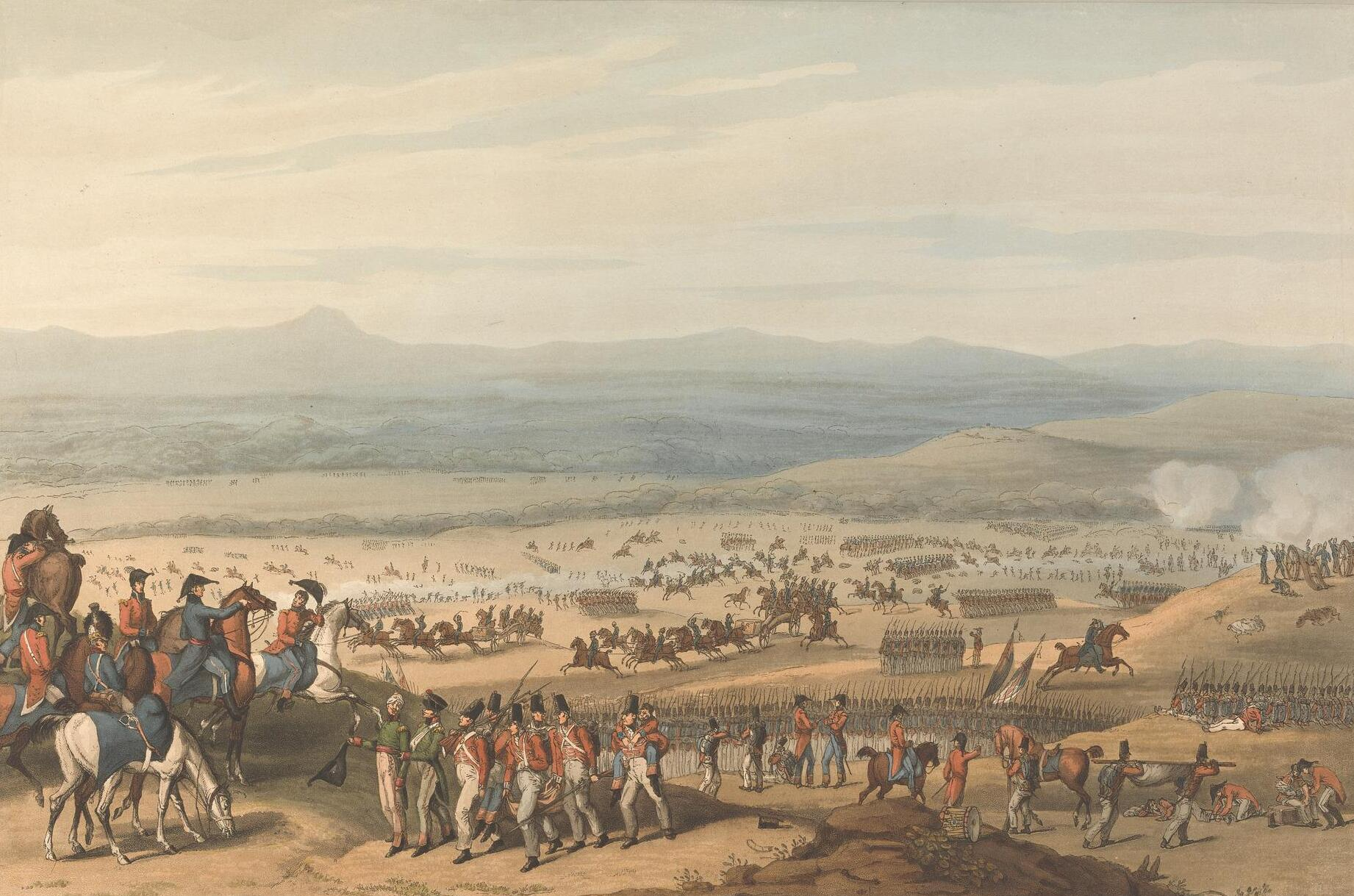
- 1811–1812 aquatint of the battle
Date	3–5 May 1811
Location	Fuentes de Oñoro, Castile and León, Spain 40°35′N 6°49′W
Result	Anglo-Portuguese victory

Belligerents
United Kingdom; Portugal	French Empire

Commanders and leaders
(United Kingdom of Great Britain and Ireland) Lord Wellington	(First French Empire) Marshal Masséna

Strength
33,000–36,000 infantry 1,850–2,000 cavalry 48 guns	40,000–42,000 infantry 4,500–5,000 cavalry 38 guns

Casualties and losses
1,452–1,800: 192–241 killed 958–1,247 wounded 255–312 captured	2,192–2,844: 267–343 killed 1,878–2,287 wounded 47–214 captured

Peninsular war: Portugal
1807 1808 1809 1810 1811

The Battle of Fuentes de Oñoro was a military engagement that took place from 3–5 May 1811 during the Peninsular War. An Anglo-Portuguese Army under Wellington checked an attempt by the French Army of Portugal under Marshal André Masséna to relieve the besieged city of Almeida. The French defeat at Fuentes de Oñoro, in addition to the steadfastness of the allies and the formidable high ground and fortified position held by Wellesley, was further facilitated by the poor cooperation between Masséna and his subordinates. As Wellington stated, if Napoleon had been at Fuentes, "we should have been beat."

== Background ==
In 1810, Masséna had followed the British–Portuguese back to Lisbon before arriving at the Lines of Torres Vedras, but was determined to avoid storming the extensive double line of interlocking fortifications. After starving outside Lisbon through a miserable winter, the French withdrew to the Spanish border with the British–Portuguese army in pursuit.

Having first secured Portugal, Wellington then set about re-taking the fortified frontier cities of Almeida, Badajoz, and Ciudad Rodrigo. Whilst Wellington besieged Almeida, Masséna reformed his battered army and marched to relieve the French garrison in the city. Wellington chose to check the relief attempt at the small village of Fuentes de Oñoro, leaving his line of retreat exposed in order to cover all routes to Almeida. He felt this risk was justified because the French would not have had more than a few days' supplies, whereas he had more than that.

The British–Portuguese Army had 34,000 infantry, 1,850 cavalry and 48 guns. The French had 42,000 infantry, 4,500 cavalry and 38 guns.

== Order of battle ==
=== The French Army of Portugal ===
Masséna's army was organised into four corps and a cavalry reserve. Louis Henri Loison's VI Corps had three divisions, led by Jean Gabriel Marchand, Julien Augustin Joseph Mermet, and Claude François Ferey. In Jean-Andoche Junot's VIII Corps, only Jean-Baptiste Solignac's division was present. Jean-Baptiste Drouet's IX Corps included the divisions of Nicolas François Conroux and Michel Marie Claparède. Louis Pierre, Count Montbrun headed the cavalry reserve. Jean Reynier's II Corps hovered off to the northeast, threatening Almeida with its two divisions under Pierre Hugues Victoire Merle and Étienne Heudelet de Bierre.

An 800-man cavalry force, comprising squadrons of the élite Imperial Guard Mounted Grenadiers of the Imperial Guard and Dragoons of the Imperial Guard, was also present at the battle under the command of Marshal Jean-Baptiste Bessières. The reinforcements that Bessières brought were almost symbolic, even though Masséna had requested that he bring the entirety of his Army corps into battle.

=== The British–Portuguese army ===
Wellington commanded six infantry divisions, Charles Ashworth's independent Portuguese brigade, and three cavalry brigades. Brent Spencer commanded the 1st Division, Thomas Picton the 3rd, William Houston the 7th, and Robert Craufurd, the Light Division. Stapleton Cotton commanded John Slade's and Frederick von Arentschildt's brigades of cavalry. Edward Howorth supervised four British (Ross RHA, Bull RHA, Lawson's RA, Thompson's RA) and four Portuguese (Arentschildt (2), Da Cunha, Rozierres) 6-gun batteries. William Erskine (5th Division), Alexander Campbell (6th Division), and 300 Portuguese cavalry under Count Barbacena were detached, facing the French II Corps.

== Battle ==
Wellington found a strong defensive position at Fuentes where a chain of heights overlooked the gorge of the Dos Casas River and placed his army there. On 3 May, Masséna launched a frontal assault against the British–Portuguese pickets holding the barricaded village, while bombarding the British–Portuguese on the heights east of the village with heavy artillery. The fight in the centre of the village lasted all that day, with French soldiers of Ferey's and Marchand's divisions clashing with troops of the British 1st and 3rd Divisions. At first, the British–Portuguese were driven back under immense pressure, but a charge that included men of the 71st Highland Light Infantry reclaimed the streets and buildings lost earlier in the day. As the sun sank, the French withdrew and the village remained in British hands, with the former suffering 650 casualties against only 250 for the British.

Both sides spent 4 May recovering from the ferocity of the previous day of fighting and reconsidered their options and battle plans. A French reconnaissance revealed that Wellington's right flank was weakly held by a unit of partisans near the hamlet of Poco Velho. Action began again at dawn on 5 May. Wellington had left the 7th Division exposed on his right flank. Masséna launched a heavy attack on the weak British–Portuguese flank, led by Montbrun's dragoons and supported by the infantry divisions of Marchand, Mermet, and Solignac. Right away, two 7th Division battalions were roughed up by French light cavalry. This compelled Wellington to send reinforcements to save the 7th Division from annihilation. This was only achieved by the efforts of the Light Division and the British and King's German Legion cavalry.

On the threatened British–Portuguese right flank, the elite Light Division, well-supported by cavalry and artillery, made a textbook fighting withdrawal. For trifling casualties, they covered the retreat of the 7th Division and fell back into a stronger position selected by Wellington. During the retreat, whenever French artillery ventured too close, the British cavalry charged or feinted a charge. This allowed the infantry time to retreat out of range. If the French horsemen pressed the outnumbered British cavalry back, the British–Portuguese infantry formed squares and their volleys drove off the French. Montbrun then requested help from the Imperial Guard cavalry, which were present but had not yet been committed to battle. Time was of the essence and Masséna at once sent one of his aides-de-camp, Charles Oudinot, with orders to bring forward the Guard cavalry. Oudinot hastily set off and Masséna was impatiently checking his watch, pressed to commit this cavalry to what he believed was a decisive action of the battle.

Much to the general staff's stupefaction, Oudinot was soon seen returning without any cavalry following him. As soon as he saw him, Masséna furiously shouted from afar: "Where is the cavalry of the Guard?". The sweaty, dust-covered Oudinot needed a moment to catch his breath after his exhausting gallop but then explained that he was not able to fetch it. Oudinot had encountered the Guard cavalry second-in-command, General Louis Lepic, who sharply refused to commit his men, saying that he only recognised the Duke of Istria (Bessières) as commander and that without explicit orders from its commander, the Guard Horse Grenadiers and Dragoons would not draw their swords. Bessières was absent from the field of battle, needlessly inspecting a series of ditches where the French army had passed a few days before. Unable to find the commander of the Guard in time, Masséna was forced to admit that the opportunity was lost.

Norman Ramsay leading I (Bull's) Troop through French lines at the battle

Two incidents spoiled this otherwise fine accomplishment for the British–Portuguese. One occurred when a British 14th Light Dragoon squadron pressed home a frontal attack on a French artillery battery and was mauled. In the second case, French cavalry caught some companies of the 3rd Foot Guards in skirmish order and inflicted 100 casualties. Masséna, however, still aimed primarily to secure Fuentes de Oñoro. He sent forward massed columns of infantry from Ferey's division. The village, filled with low stone walls, provided excellent cover for the British line infantry and skirmishers, while the French were severely restricted in the little narrow streets. At first, the French had some success, wiping out two companies of the 79th Foot and wounding the regiment's commander, Lieutenant-Colonel Philips Cameron, who died some days later.

However, a counterattack chased Ferey's men out of the village. d'Erlon launched a second attack on the village. This time, it was led by three battalions of converging grenadiers from the IX Corps. With their old-fashioned bearskin hats, the grenadiers were mistaken for the Imperial Guard. Again, the British fell back. d'Erlon threw in about half of the battalions from both Conroux and Claparède's divisions, seizing almost the entire village. In response, Wellington counterattacked with units from the 1st and 3rd Divisions, plus the Portuguese 6th Caçadores, led by the 88th Connaught Rangers Foot. This broke d'Erlon's attack, and the tide began to turn. Low on ammunition, the French had to resort to the bayonet in a futile attempt to drive the British back. One party of 100 grenadiers was trapped in a tight spot and killed. Facing murderous volleys, the French halted and retreated back to the Dos Casas, leaving their casualties behind.

By sunset, French morale had plummeted and many companies were down to 40% strength. The French artillery tried to bombard the new British line into submission, but they were outgunned by Wellington's cannons. Finally, with their artillery ammunition dangerously low, the French attacks came to an end. Wellington's men entrenched during the evening. After spending the next three days parading before the British position, Masséna gave up the attempt and retreated to Ciudad Rodrigo. He was furious because Bessières had refused to fetch ammunition from the citadel.

== Aftermath ==
Wellington had repelled Napoleon's Army of Portugal, inflicting a great number of casualties, and was able to continue his blockade of Almeida. The numbers of losses vary according to different sources, from 2,200 to 2,800 French compared to the loss of 1,800 British–Portuguese. Wellington nevertheless acknowledged how dangerous the situation had been, saying later, "If Boney had been there, we should have been beat." He also acknowledged that he had unnecessarily extended his line, putting the 7th Division and Light Division in danger. Wellington did not mark the battle as a victory.

Wellington's confidence and moral authority had been boosted by holding the Lines of Torres Vedras in the spring of 1811. He now intended to move over to the offensive, for which policy he had received de facto authorisation from his political masters in London. There were talks of major reductions in the size of the army employed in Portugal instead of promises of major reinforcements.

For Wellington supply difficulties and sickness amongst the troops and want of siege artillery ensured that in the short term no great strokes of strategy could be envisaged. It was hoped that Almeida, Ciudad Rodrigo and Badajoz might be all recaptured, thereby opening the way for lightning strikes on such targets as Salamanca or Seville. In the event, however, success was limited, as the rest of 1811 ended up with failure and frustration.

Two nights after Masséna's withdrawal, Antoine Brenier's 1,400-man French garrison of Almeida slipped through the British–Portuguese lines during the night. About 360 French troops were captured, but the rest escaped when their British pursuers ran into a French ambush. This fiasco was blamed on Erskine and others. An infuriated Wellington wrote, "I have never been so much distressed by any military event as by the escape of even a man of them."

On reaching Ciudad Rodrigo, Masséna was recalled to Paris by a furious Napoleon to explain his actions (although Napoleon had issued the order to return prior to the battle). He was replaced by Marshal Auguste Marmont. Masséna set off for France with a vast sum of gold, looted from Portugal and Spain. The defeated French marshal complained that Wellington "had not left him one black hair on his body—he had turned grey all over."

This battle also included a notable friendly fire incident when a French infantry unit mistook their allies, the Hanoverian Legion, for an English battalion and opened fire on them. The unfortunate Hanoverians retreated hastily past the village, leaving over 100 dead. The confusion came about because the Hanoverian Legion wore red coats, and in the smoke and heat of battle the finer details of uniforms that might have distinguished them from British line infantry were easily overlooked.

Wellington commended his troops for their generosity after the battle, writing, "The village of Fuentes de Oñoro having been the field of battle the other day, and not having been much improved by this circumstance, they immediately and voluntarily subscribed to raise a sum of money, to be given to the inhabitants as a compensation for the damage which their properties have sustained in the contest."

The battle is erroneously included in the list of French victories on the Arc de Triomphe as FUENTE D'OŨORO.

== In fiction ==
- Cornwell, Bernard, Sharpe's Battle, HarperCollins, 1995, ISBN 0-00-224307-5. The book includes most of the events of the battle and a description of the British right-wing withdrawal conducted under the Light Division's commander Robert Craufurd. The novel has several fictional characters, but includes actual historic people, such as Wellington and Massena.

== Bibliography ==
- Bodart, Gaston (1908). Militär-historisches Kriegs-Lexikon (1618–1905).
- Chartrand, René (2002). Fuentes de Oñoro: Wellington's Liberation of Portugal. Osprey Publishing. ISBN 978-1-84176-311-8.
- Esdaile, Charles (2003). The Peninsular War: A New History. Palgrave Macmillan. ISBN 978-1-4039-6231-7.
- Gates, David (2001). The Spanish Ulcer: A History of the Peninsular War. Da Capo Press. ISBN 0-306-81083-2.
- Glover, Michael (2001). The Peninsular War 1807–1814. London: Penguin. ISBN 0-14-139041-7.
- Longford, Elizabeth (1969). Wellington: The Years of the Sword. Harper & Row.
- McGuigan, Ron; Burnham, Robert (2017). Wellington's Brigade Commanders: Peninsula & Waterloo. Casemate. ISBN 978-1-4738-5080-4.
- napoleonistyka (2021). "Infantry Tactics and Combat". Archived from the original on 19 May 2021.
- Oman, (Sir) Charles (1911). A History of the Peninsular War. Vol. 4. London: Clarendon Press.
- Paget, Julian (1996). Wellington's Peninsular War – Battles and Battlefields. London. ISBN 0-85052-603-5.
- Smith, Digby (1998). The Napoleonic Wars Data Book. Greenhill. ISBN 1853672769.
- Sokolov, Oleg (2005). L'armée de Napoléon. Éditions Commios. ISBN 2-9518364-1-4.
- Weller, Jac (1969). Wellington in the Peninsula, 1808–1814. London: Neudruck. ISBN 0-7182-0730-0.

Preceded by Blockade of Almeida	Napoleonic Wars; Battle of Fuentes de Oñoro	Succeeded by Siege of Tarragona (1811)
