= Caçadores =

Former Portuguese light infantry units

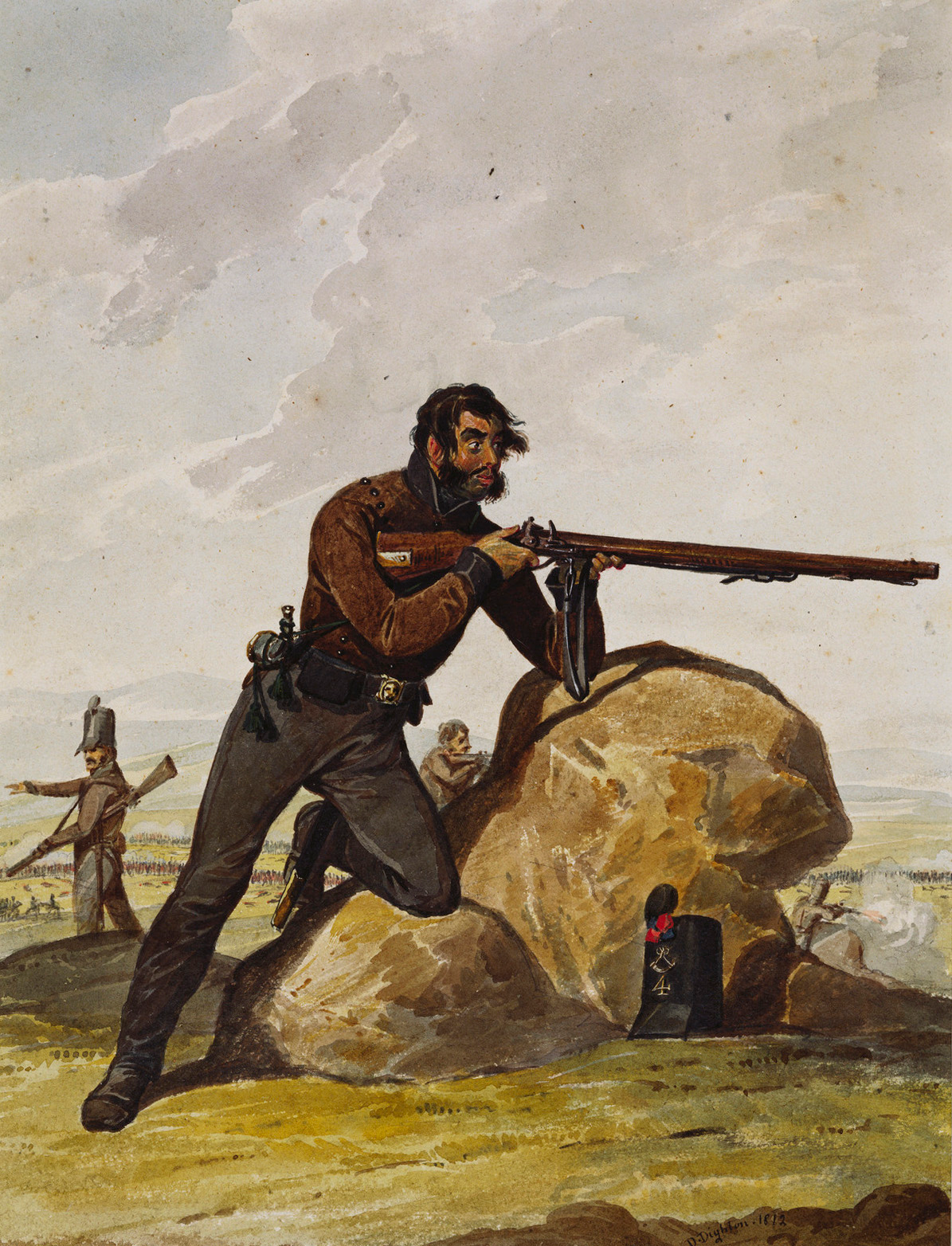
- 1812 painting of a 4th Caçadores Battalion soldier
- Country: Portugal
- Branch: Portuguese Army
- Type: Light infantry
- Role: Sharpshooting
- Nickname: Fighting Cocks

The Caçadores (lit. 'hunters') were the elite light infantry troops of the Portuguese Army, in the late 18th and early 19th centuries. Units of Caçadores – with features somewhat different from the original ones – continued to exist in the Portuguese Armed Forces until the 1970s, namely the Caçadores Especiais (special hunters) – several special forces companies of the Portuguese Army created by the Special Operations Troops Centre at the beginning of the 1960s and heavily employed throughout the Portuguese Colonial War (1961–1974) in Africa.

== Etymology ==
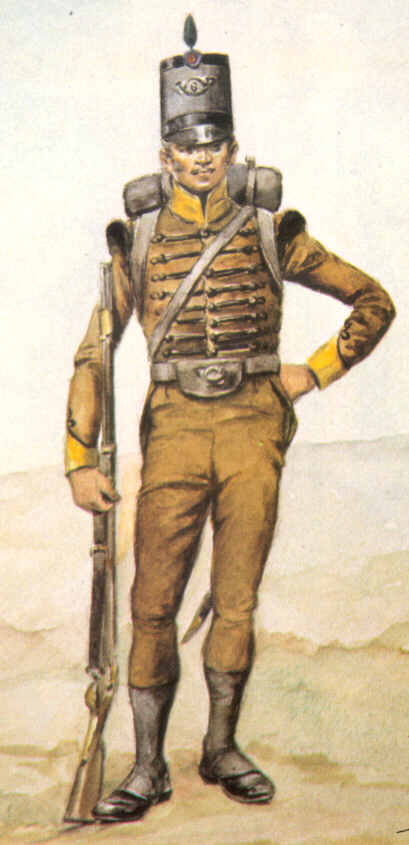
A 6th Caçadores Battalion soldier in 1811

Caçadores is the plural of caçador, the Portuguese word for "hunter". It has also been used to designate each one of the elite light infantry soldiers of the Portuguese Army. As such it is a direct equivalent of the German military term Jäger and the French military term chasseur. It may also be considered comparable to the English language term ranger.

== Origins ==
The origins of the Caçadores can be found in several light infantry units created in the Portuguese Army during the 18th century, such as the Royal Volunteers Regiment and the Light Troops Legion. After the War of the Pyrenees in 1797, a company of Caçadores was created in each Portuguese infantry regiment.

== Peninsular War and 19th century ==
In 1808 the Portuguese government realised the necessity of appointing a commander-in-chief capable of training, equipping and disciplining the demoralised Portuguese Army, which had not performed well against the French invaders. After the expulsion of General Junot's army from Portugal, British Army General William Beresford was recommended by Arthur Wellesley for the role and was appointed as Commander-in-Chief of the Portuguese Army on 7 March 1809. As part of Beresford's reforms, Portuguese War secretary Miguel Pereira Forjaz proposed the creation of independent battalions of Caçadores and six were created. Later in the Peninsular War, additional battalions and other units of Caçadores were formed due to the success of the original six battalions. Each battalion came to include a special Atiradores (sharpshooters) company armed with rifles in place of the muskets of ordinary infantry. In the Anglo-Portuguese Army, some Caçadores units were integrated into the elite Light Division; brigaded with the British units of the 95th Rifles.

One of the most distinctive features of the Caçadores was their brown uniform, in contrast to the dark blue worn by the bulk of the Portuguese Army of that period. Surviving examples of this clothing show it to have been of a dark maroon shade. The brown uniform served as an early form of camouflage, considered better suited for the dry lands of the Iberian Peninsula than the traditional green uniforms used by the rifle and jager regiments of the British and various German armies. It was to remain as the distinctive feature of the Caçadore uniform until the final years of the 19th century, when dark blue was substituted.

During the Peninsular War, Caçadores became especially notable in the performance of marksmanship at long distances. Arthur Wellesley referred the Portuguese Caçadores as the "fighting cocks" of his Anglo-Portuguese Army.

The battalions and later regiments of Caçadores continued to constitute the light infantry of the Portuguese Army during the rest of the 19th century. However, with the advent of new firearms technologies and new infantry tactics, the differences between the Caçadores and the line infantry steadily decreased. Because of this, in the reorganization of the Portuguese Army of 1911, the decision was taken to disband the Caçadores units and to transform them into line infantry regiments.

== 20th century ==
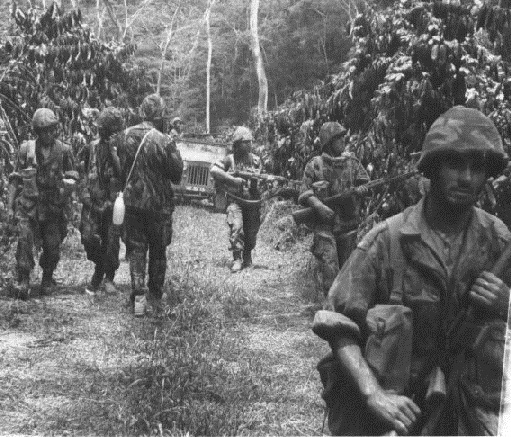
Caçadores Especiais in the early 1960s, during the Angolan War of Independence.

In the 20th century, several types of units named Caçadores were created or recreated in the Portuguese Armed Forces, namely:

1. Caçadores battalions – recreated, in the Portuguese Army reorganization of 1926, as border defense units, kept in a high state of readiness. They were designed to defend the border against an enemy attack, for the time necessary to mobilize the line infantry units;
2. Caçadores (Overseas) – the title "Caçadores" was also given, in the 1930s, to the light infantry battalions and independent companies responsible for the garrison of the Portuguese overseas territories. There were units of this type mobilized both in metropolitan Portugal and locally in each overseas territory, providing the majority of units employed by the Portuguese Army in the Portuguese Colonial War;
3. Caçadores Especiais (special hunters) – several special forces companies of the Portuguese Army created by the Special Operations Troops Centre at the beginning of the 1960s. These units, made up of both African and white troops, wore a brown beret in the colour of the uniforms of the Caçadores of the Peninsular War. Later the Caçadores Especiais were abolished and the brown beret was adopted by most of the units of the Portuguese Army. The distinctive dark brown uniforms worn by Caçadore regiments prior to 1911 survive as the modern full dress of the Colégio Militar (Military Academy) in Lisbon;
4. Caçadores Paraquedistas (parachutist hunters) – a paratrooper battalion (later regiment) formed by the Portuguese Air Force, in the 1950s. Later, battalions of Caçadores Paraquedistas were also created in Angola, Mozambique and Portuguese Guinea.

The Caçadores (Overseas), Caçadores Especiais and Caçadores Paraquedistas were deeply involved in the Portuguese African Wars, from 1961 to 1975.

In 1975 the title "Caçadores" was discontinued in the Portuguese Armed Forces. All existing units of Caçadores were disbanded or reclassified as ordinary line infantry. The 5th Caçadores Battalion continued to exist as an administrative unit until 1988, with the role of winding-up the disbanded military regions and territorial commands of the former Overseas forces.
