= Royal Fortress of the Conception =

Spanish fortress

Fortress of the Conception
- Real Fuerte de la Concepción
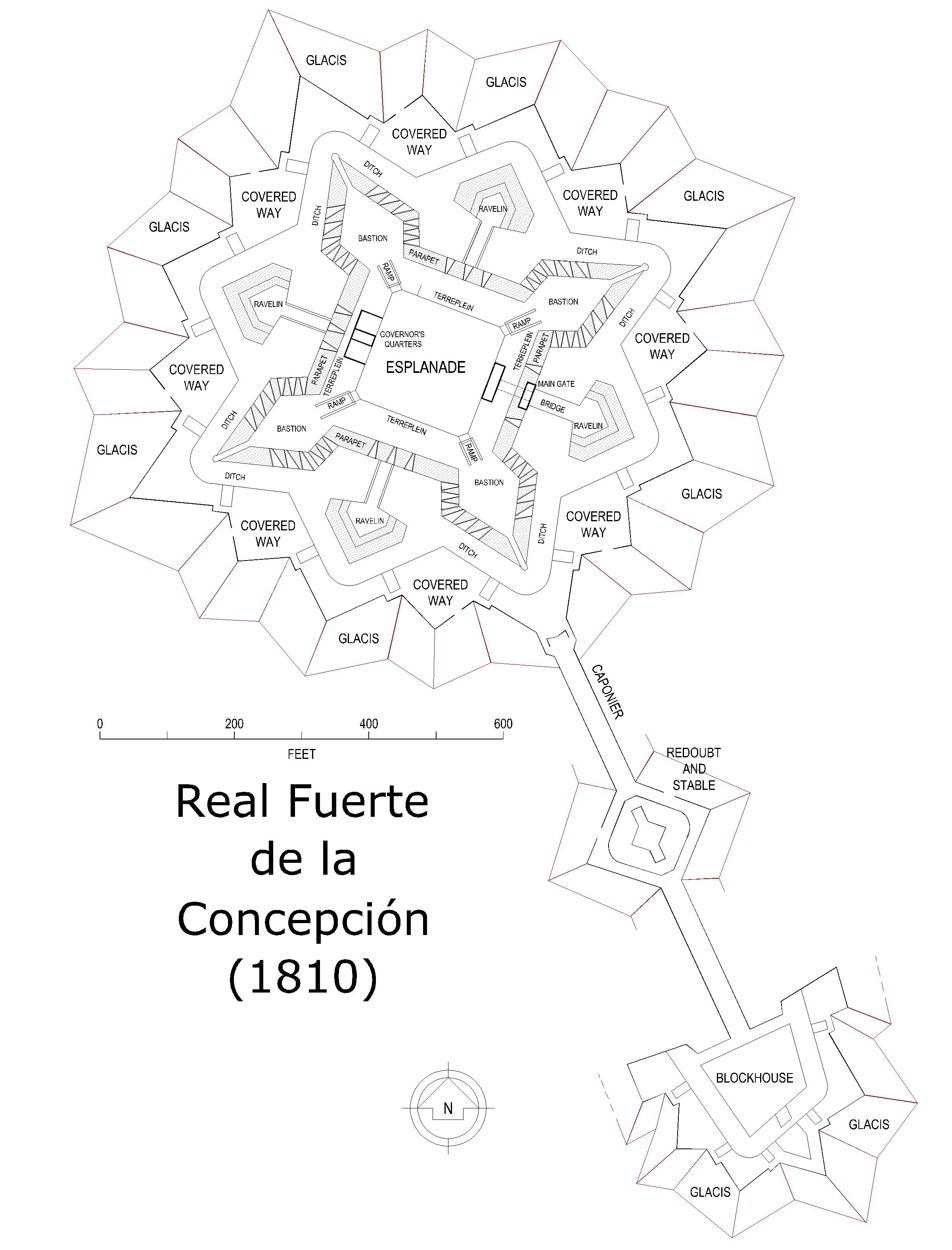
- Fortress of the Conception
- Alternative names: Castillo de Aldea del Obispo; Hotel Domus Real Fuerte de la Concepción

General information
- Type: Star Fortress
- Architectural style: Vaubanesque style
- Location: Aldea del Obispo; Province of Salamanca; Castile and León; Spain, Avenida de Portugal, s/n, 37488 Aldea del Obispo, Salamanca, Spain
- Coordinates: 40°42′11.2″N 6°48′15.6″W
- Construction started: First fortress, 8 December 1663 (date of the festival of the Immaculate Conception); Second fortress, 1735
- Completed: 1758
- Renovated: 1735–1758; 2006–2012
- Demolished: 1808 (partially by the French); 27 July 1810 by the British

Design and construction
- Architects: Simón Jocquet (1664); Pedro Moreau (1735)
- Main contractor: Manuel de Lara Churriguera

The fortress of Real Fuerte de la Concepción (English: Royal Fortress of the Conception) is a star fortress built in the Vaubanesque style. It is located 0.6 miles (0.97 km) west of the village of Aldea del Obispo in the province of Salamanca, western Spain, part of the autonomous community of Castile and León. The fortress was constructed there because of its position of great strategic significance due to its proximity to the border between Spain and Portugal which lies 0.4 miles (0.64 km) to the west of the fortress. The Fortress of the Concepcion is also opposite the Portuguese castle fortress of Almeida which lies 5.5 miles (8.9 km) west-north-west of the fortress. In 2006, the derelict fortress was sold privately and the site was renovated into a luxury hotel which opened in 2012.

== History ==
In 1640, following the death of Philip II, the conflict known as the Portuguese Restoration War began. The new Spanish King, Philip III of Spain, intended to make Portugal a Spanish province, and Portuguese nobles stood to lose all of their power. As a consequence the Portuguese restored their independence from Spain. On the 1 December 1640, following a military coup the Duke of Braganza was proclaimed king of Portugal and became John IV. The Spanish King began to make plans to recover the throne of Portugal and part of these plans was the strengthening of fortifications along the border along with the construction of new fortresses along the border of the two countries. The area of the border between the River Côa and the River Águeda became a buffer zone between the two kingdoms. The Fortress of the Concepcion was one of the new fortresses constructed by order of the Duke of Osuna, commander of the Spanish Army and was located in this area to serve as a military station for the Spanish army to recover Portugal.

=== Construction ===
The construction of the fortress was under the control of the French military engineer Simon Jocquet and work began on the 8 December 1663, the Feast Day of the Immaculate Conception, hence the name given to the new fortress. The first phase of construction was completed on 20 January 1664 taking just 40 days. This first phase saw construction around a large central courtyard with Pentagon bastions in each corner, reinforced by earthworks around the perimeter, bundles of brushwood fascine's and filled baskets of wicker woven around stakes in circles, to form Redoubts. The fort was garrisoned by 1,500 infantrymen and 200 cavalrymen.

=== 1664 De-commissioning ===
On 7 July 1664 the Spanish and Portuguese forces clashed at the Battle of Castelo Rodrigo. Following the initial success of the Spanish army, the Portuguese sent a reinforcement of 3,000 men under the leadership of Viscount of Fonte Arcada. The Portuguese counter-attack proved decisive. Many prisoners were taken and all the artillery pieces captured. It is told that Osuna and John of Austria the Younger, escaped from Castelo Rodrigo disguised as monks. Following Osuna's fall from grace Philip III of Spain took over control of the army and ordered the partial demolition of Fort Concepcion, which had been operational for less than a year. What remained was still occasionally used as a base for Spanish troops in the border area.

=== 1735 Re-construction ===
In 1668 the Spanish officially recognised the independence of the Portuguese kingdom but the border zone was regarded with suspicion by both countries. The following decades saw the Portuguese improving the fortified strongholds at Olivenza then part of Portugal, Elvas, Valença do Minho and Almeida and in reaction to these border fortification enhancements, the Spanish instigated works on a line of fortifications on their side of the border. Following the establishment of the Bourbon dynasty with the reign of Philip V, the First Ministers José Patiño ordered the re-construction and enhancement of Fort Concepcion. The works on the new structure were built using much of the previous fortress's footprint. In charge of the construction was the military engineer Pedro Moreau in collaboration with the architect and sculptor Manuel Lara Churriguera. Work began in May, 1736. Moreau's work was taken over by Antonio de Gaver and Juan Giraldo de Chaves on several occasions when he was called away to work on the fortifications at Oran in Algeria, and Cádiz. The Fortress was completed in 1758, just before war erupted once more in 1762 between the Spanish and British. During this War the Spanish invaded Portugal, using Concepcion as Cantonment, but the area around the fortress remained quiet and, when hostilities ended in 1763, not a shot had been fired in anger, from or towards the fortress.

=== The Peninsular War ===
The Peninsular War started when French and Spanish armies occupied Portugal in 1807, and escalated in 1808 when France turned on Spain. As a consequence, the Fortress of Concepcion fell into the control of the French forces. On 24 May 1808 French troops under the command of General Louis Henri Loison marched on the Fortress of Almeida.

==== French occupation ====
By 12 June, Loison had turned his attention to the Fortress of Concepcion. The French column informed the fort's Governor that they had arrived to relieve the garrison. Fearing the behaviour of the French column, the Governor and his garrison quickly abandoned the fort to the French, escaping their clutches by slipping out the fort's postern gate. Loison now occupied both Concepcion and the Fortress of Almeida. By 16 June, Loison had received orders to march on the city of Porto to suppress an insurrection by the Portuguese against the French occupation. Loison set out and on reaching the town of Mesão Frio 58 miles (93 km) northwest of Almeida, his troops were stopped by Portuguese insurgents. On retreating to Almeida, Loison received a fresh dispatch from General Junot, ordering him to march on Lisbon which was threatening insurrection. Before leaving Almeida, Loison arranged to have the cannons and garrison of Fort Concepcion moved to Almeida and to have the northernmost bastions of the fortress blown up in the hope of rendering the fortress useless if it fell into the enemies' hands.

==== French withdrawal ====
On 30 August 1808 the Convention of Sintra was signed by General Junot, under whose terms the French Army, all its equipment and all its baggage were to be evacuated from Portugal and eastern Spain by the British Navy, from Porto, as soon as possible. By October British Forces had re-occupied the fortress of Concepcion and the fortress of Almeida. Despite the retreat of General Sir John Moore to A Coruña in January, 1809 the fortress remained in the hands of the Portuguese and British.

==== 1810 ====
Unable to resume command personally, Napoleon appointed his most dependable Marshal, Masséna to take charge of the Army of Portugal in April,1810. This army of three corps had a total of 65,000 men, with a further reinforcement of 20,000 troops promised once they were ready. By May, 1810 Wellington's forces were becoming stronger as supplies and manpower increased. Wellington's espionage network had informed him of Masséna's appointment and a French lieutenant who had deserted to one of Craufurd's pickets revealed that the French had moved 80,000 troops to the province and where preparing to invade Portugal once more. Wellington's response to an impending invasion of Portugal from Ciudad Rodrigo was to strengthen his defences in the border region. He ordered the refortifying of the Fortress of the Concepcion, and repair to the fort's partially destroyed bastions, which had been blown up by the French in their 1808 retreat.

Brigadier General William Cox, the military governor of Almeida was in charge of the works. He attempted to enlist Spanish labourers to do the work but was unsuccessful, and he was forced to use soldiers of the Portuguese 9th Line to complete the work. The rebuilding were overseen by Captain John Burgoyne of Corps of Royal Engineers. As well as the Portuguese soldiers, Burgoyne also had a small collection of skilled Portuguese stonemasons and carpenters at his disposal. The workforce set about clearing all the debris in the surrounding ditches caused by the French demolitions, and palisades were erected. Repairs were also made to the bastions at the north end of the fortress. The bridge into the fortress was repaired along with the drawbridge, covered walkways and gates. Burgoyne was also ordered to sink mines into the two previously undamaged formidable bastions. Six tons of gunpowder were piled in barrels in each of the four demilunes, and more barrels of powder were stacked in the casemates of the adjoining curtain walls to the four bastions. Further explosives were placed in the central arch of the fort's redoubt and the casemates and blockhouse to the south east of the fortress were packed with a total of three tons of powder. The strategy behind these set charges was that, if the fortress was likely to fall into the hands of the French, the retreating garrison would ignite the charges, destroying the fortress and preventing the French from using Concepcion as a base to attack Almeida.

Once the fortifications had been repaired, Brigadier Cox kept the Portuguese 9th Line, along with 120 artillerymen sent from Almeida, to garrison the fortress. He was also sent two howitzers, four six-pounder guns and four eight-pounder guns. With the hardware, he also received 12,000 rations, 10,000 rounds of infantry ammunition and 100 rounds for each piece of artillery supplied. Cox also stationed four companies of the 45th Foot which were divided between the two nearby villages of Aldea del Obispo and Vale da Mula. These troops would quickly reinforce the fortress if it came under attack.

==== Siege of Ciudad Rodrigo ====
On the 26 April 1810 the French Army of Portugal took up position to besiege the Spanish fortified town of Ciudad Rodrigo as a prelude to its invasion of Portugal. Under Masséna's plan, his forces were to capture and consolidate this border town as a base for the invading army. On 25 June a concerned Wellington decided to visit the fortified town of Almeida. He held discussions with Brigadier-General Cox, the governor of the fortress, and toured the local picket posts and positions along the border manned by Crauford's Light Division. He also visited the fortress of the Concepcion, inspecting the repairs and preparations made by Captain Burgoyne. After his tour of inspection, Wellington returned to Almeida and wrote a memo to Crauford suggesting modifications and improvements which he should make. Along with these recommendations were suggestions of the way a tactical withdraw should proceed, when, as Wellington expected, the French attacked the border. The Siege of Ciudad Rodrigo ended on 9 July when the French VI Corps, under the command of Marshal Michel Ney, took the fortified city after its Governor, Don Andrés Perez de Herrasti, surrendered his 5,500-man Spanish garrison, which had put up a gallant defence of the city to be beaten only when Ney's artillery opened a large, practicable breach in the walls. The siege had delayed Masséna's invasion plans for Portugal by over a month, but now the French were ready to move west towards Almeida, with the Fort of Concepcion lying in their path.

==== The capture and destruction of the Fort of Concepcion ====
Even before the fall of Ciudad Rodrigo, the French had probed the defending British pickets to the west of the city, towards the border. On 4 July, General Junot had accompanied General Sainte-Croix on a reconnaissance of the area. Following several skirmishes and actions Junot had reconnoitred the fortress of Concepcion, after which he temporarily withdrew his forces to Ciudad Rodrigo. Wellington's strategy now instructed Burgoyne to prepare to evacuate the fortress and to demolish it with his prepared charges. By 4 July, the Portuguese 9th line, Portuguese Artillery battery and the four companies of the 45th foot had withdrawn to Picton's Division near the town of Pinhel. At the fortress the three companies of Portuguese Caçadores who had been left on picket duty were replaced with horseman of the 14th Light Dragoons, and two companies of the 95th Rifles, who were tasked with guarding the fortress and setting off the mines as they left.

In the early hours of the morning of 21 July, Loison's 25th Dragoons, 3rd Hussars and supporting infantry crossed the Dos Casas stream and rapidly proceeded up the hillside from Aldea del Obispo towards the Fortress of Concepcion. In front of them, in full retreat were the 14th Light Dragoons. Captain Brotherton sent one of his officers ahead of the retreat to inform Burgoyne that his Light Dragoons were retreating and that time was short before the French would be on the fortress. Brotherton was able to delay the French long enough for Burgoyne's mines to be fired. At 4:45 am, a large explosion hurled debris from the fortress's masonry across the surrounding countryside. A number of men and horses of the dragoons were caught and killed in the explosion. Burgoyne reported that one side of the fortress had blown up, although he was unable to ascertain the extent of damage because the British had had to evacuate so rapidly. The Fortress had been severely damaged but the French, who now took possession, discovered that only one of the four mines had detonated. There had been several other smaller explosions and the fortress's defences had been seriously compromised.

==== The second French occupation ====
Following the explosions, Loison, under Ney's orders took possession of Concepcion and its surrounding plateau for the second time. The French now would use Concepcion's close proximity to the Fortress of Almeida as a base for the organisation of the Investment of the Fortress. There now began a period of activity which involved preparation for Concepcion to be the Headquarters for Marshal Masséna. The men of Masséna État-major (Staff) moved into some of the remaining bomb proof casemates along with their horses. Masséna's first aide-de-camp, Pelet also took up residence in a casemate. With this influx of staff and men into the fortress came some new resources, including four baking ovens along with many bakers. Three companies of Taupin's infantry provided the garrison. The French army laid siege to Almeida on July 25, 1810. On 16 August, Masséna took up residence in the old Governor's quarters to oversee operations personally. However Masséna's stay at Concepcion was short. By the 26 August the Siege of Almeida was over. Masséna's Army of Portugal swiftly took over Almeida and then moved on towards Lisbon. Wellington's tactics of delaying Masséna along the borderlands close to Concepcion and his tactical withdrawal from the border fortresses had given him time to strengthen the Lines of Torres Vedras, which Masséna decided were too formidable to overrun, leading to the eventual French withdrawal from Portugal in 1811.

==== Second French withdrawal ====
By October Masséna's army was at the Lines of Torres Vedras, which proved to be the obstacle that stopped the French from taking Lisbon. Wellington's Allied Army grew stronger, with reinforcements of troops, supplies and equipment from Britain arriving daily. The Portuguese army was now well trained and its numbers had increased. Napoleon, despite requests from Masséna, had only sent a further 7,000 troops to reinforce the Army of Portugal. However, the biggest obstacle to Masséna was the lack of supplies, both of food and ammunition. Masséna could not be supplied from Spain and thus his army had to be fed by foraging in the surrounding countryside. Wellington, however, had taken the precaution of having most resources in the area destroyed or hidden. By March, 1811 the Army of Portugal was starving and its munitions and powder were almost depleted. On 5 March 1811 Masséna reluctantly ordered a retreat from Portugal. Just 8.0 miles (12.9 km) south of Concepcion is the Border village of Fuentes de Oñoro. The defeat of Masséna's forces at the Battle of Fuentes de Oñoro between the 3rd and 4 May 1811 was the final action that pushed the French out of Portugal. Before the battle, Wellington's Allied army had taken up positions along the line of low hills which ran from the Fort of Concepcion towards Fuentes de Oñoro. Seeing this buildup and with no orders to hold out, the small French garrison left at the Fortress of the Concepcion quickly withdrew, leaving without further damage being inflicted on the Fortress.

== Gallery ==
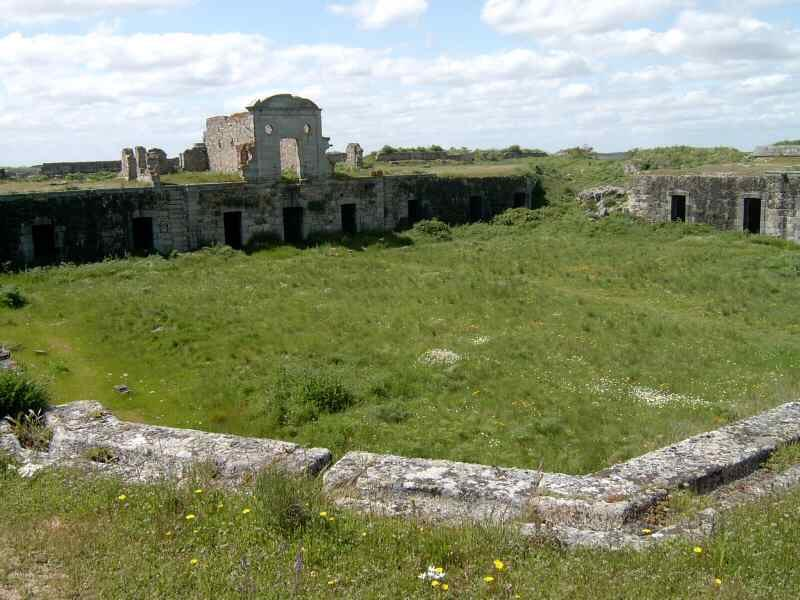
Central esplanade of the fortress looking towards the Governor's Quarters

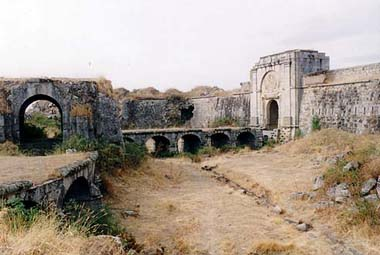
The bridge across to the main gate to the fortress

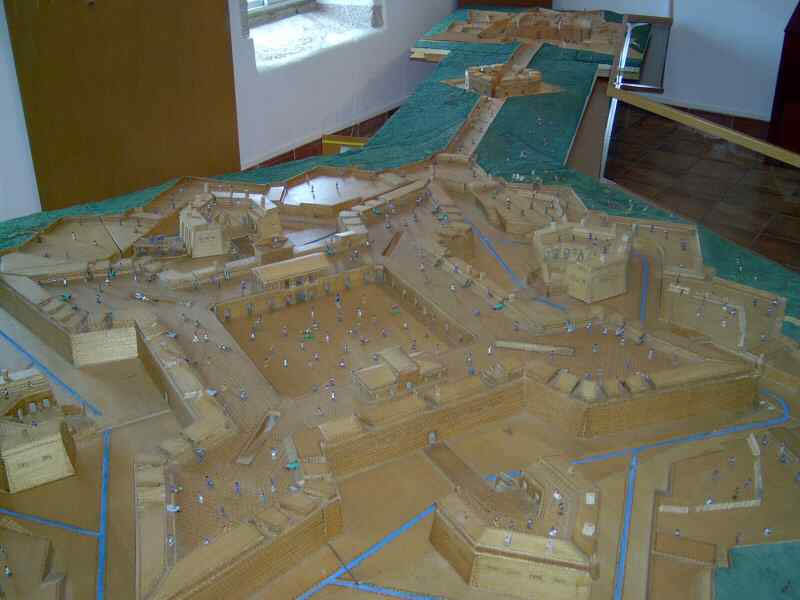
A model of the fortress on display in the near-by village of Aldea del Obispo

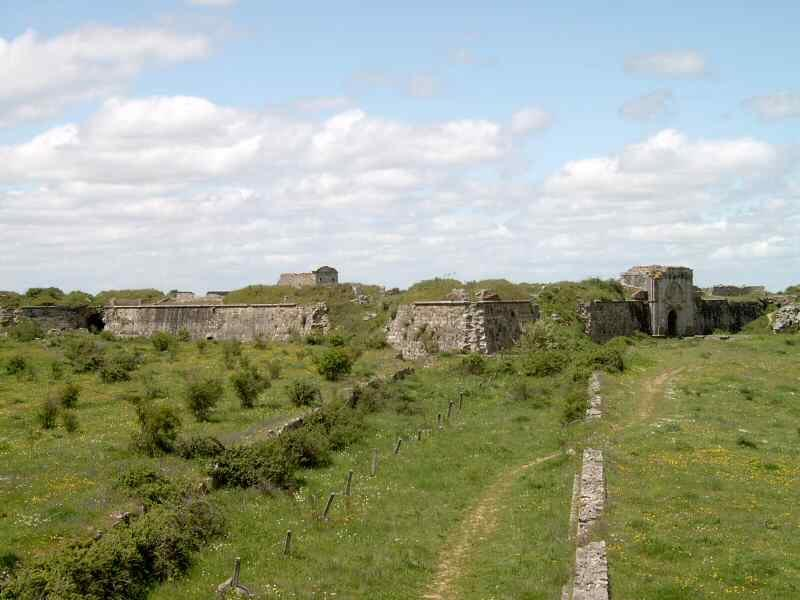
View looking towards the fortress from the south east from the remains of the Caponier
