= Combat of Barquilla (1810) =

1810 combat during the Peninsular War

- Part of Peninsular War
Date	11 July 1810
Location	Heights of Barquilla, north of Villar de Puerco, Castile and León, Spain 40°40′N 6°42′W
Result	French victory

Belligerents
(First French Empire) French Empire	United Kingdom; Portugal

Commanders and leaders
(First French Empire) Pierre Gouache	(United Kingdom) Robert Craufurd

Strength
200 infantry 30-40 cavalry	Unknown

Casualties and losses
31 captured	32–40 casualties

Peninsular War
Third French invasion:
1 Siege of Astorga March April 1810
2 Siege of Ciudad Rodrigo April 1810
3 Siege of Almeida July 1810
3.1 Blockade of Almeida April 1811
4 Battle of Bussaco September 1810
5 Torres Vedras protects Lisbon
6 Battle of Redinha March 1811
7 Battle of Sabugal April 1811
8 Battle of Fuentes de Oñoro May 1811

The Combat of Barquilla (11 July 1810) was a minor skirmish between British and French forces two days after the siege of Ciudad Rodrigo, in which Robert Craufurd attacked French grenadiers covering a foraging party. The French grenadiers, formed in a single square, made a fighting withdrawal, fending off British cavalry and escaping unscathed.

== Background ==
The Anglo-Portuguese under Craufurd were forced back to Fort Conception during the siege of Ciudad Rodrigo, which fell on 9 July 1810. During this period the French launched raids near the allied positions.

In retaliation, Craufurd took five or six squadrons of cavalry and several companies of infantry to attack and cut off a raiding party sent by General Roche Godart. These squadrons of cavalry included the 1st Hussars from the King's German Legion, and the 16th and 14th Light Dragoons.

Two days after Ciudad Rodrigo fell, at four o'clock on the morning of 11 July, the British came into contact with a small body of troops near the village of Barquilla. The badly outnumbered French force, under the command of Captain Pierre Gouache, was covering a foraging party in a corn field. It consisted of two companies of grenadiers of the 22nd Regiment of Junot's corps (around 200 men) supported by around 30 cavalry.

== Battle ==
Craufurd brought up three squadrons of cavalry (the KGL 1st Hussars, the 16th and 14th Light Dragoons) to attack the French infantry, formed in a single square in a corn field. The first attack was made by the hussars of the KGL. As the horsemen closed in, the French grenadiers stood up and opened fire. However, the hussars then proceeded past the infantry square and charged the French cavalry. Upon seeing how large the British force was, the cavalry surrendered.

Meanwhile, the 16th Light Dragoons came forward and failed to come in contact with the square. The 14th Light Dragoons, led by Colonel Talbot, managed to attack the square but were badly repulsed. Talbot and eight of his men were killed and many horsemen were wounded.

The squadron was thrown in disorder but was recalled. However, Craufurd was too slow in bringing up his infantry and the French infantry withdrew without having suffered any casualties.

== Aftermath ==
Despite having taken around 30 cavalry prisoner the combat was a failure. The British suffered 30-40 casualties, and failed to defeat the much smaller force of French infantry whilst allowing the infantry to escape with minimal losses.

Although the Combat of Barquilla was a minor incident during Masséna's campaign, it was damaging to Craufurd's reputation. Two weeks later, despite suffering defeat, Craufurd redeemed himself at the Battle of the Côa. Captain Gouache, on the other hand, received recognition for his achievement and was promoted.

Preceded by Siege of Ciudad Rodrigo (1810)	Napoleonic Wars; Combat of Barquilla (1810)	Succeeded by Combat of the Côa
