= Julián Sánchez García =

Spanish guerrillero and army officer (1774–1832)

Julián Sánchez
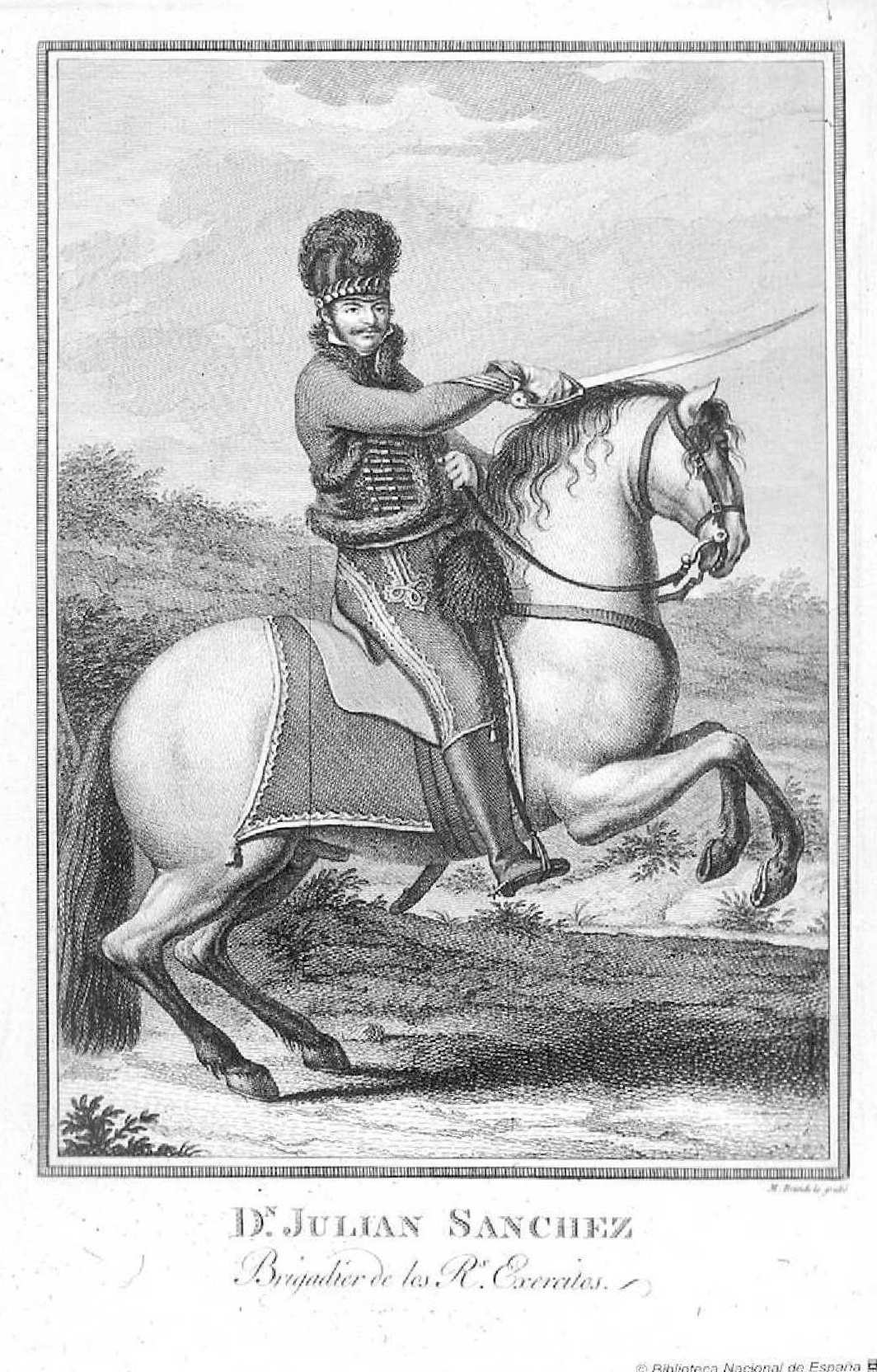
- Engraving of Sánchez as a brigadier, by Mariano Brandi, Biblioteca Nacional
- Born: 3 June 1774; Muñoz, Salamanca
- Died: 19 October 1832 (aged 58) Etreros, Segovia
- Conflicts: Peninsular War

Julián Sánchez García (3 June 1774 – 19 October 1832), nicknamed El Charro or Don Julián, was a Spanish guerrillero and military commander.

== Early career ==
After having enlisted in the Mallorca Infantry Regiment in 1793, Sánchez saw action in the War of the Pyrenees, being wounded on seven occasions. He was later captured at the surrender of El Boló, and remained a prisoner of war for 18 months until the signing of the Peace of Basel (1795).

== Peninsular War ==
In August 1808 he joined a Cavalry unit formed in Ciudad Rodrigo, and led a small band of lancers that skirmished with the French forces in the south of the region of Salamanca.

=== 1809 ===
In mid-February 1809, he was promoted to Cavalry alférez and later that month, at the head of 12 lancers, he captured a French convoy near Vitigudino, taking five prisoners. The following day, at the bridge over the Huebra at Yecla de Yeltes, his band captured 15 more French troops and a few days later, at Ledesma, and in the presence of General Wilson, (Note: The source does not mention which Wilson it refers to. There were, at that time and in that area, two British generals of that name, both serving with the Loyal Lusitanian Legion: John Wilson and his commanding officer, Robert Wilson.) Sánchez's men surprised and defeated a French advance party of an officer and 23 men.

The following April, with the aim of forcing the French troops to withdraw from around the town of Ciudad Rodrigo, he organised a series of successful skirmishes which continued harassing the French rearguard as they retreated. His men later attacked a 75-wagon convoy at Herguijuela, killing 28 of the escort and taking some prisoners. In May, he forced the French troops to withdraw from Ledesma.

In June 1809, near Zamora, he attacked a convoy, escorted by 40 dragoons, and made off with 120 oxen and 120 horses. That same month, at Almeida de Sayago, at the head of 50 lancers, he attacked a column of 186 dragoons, killing 43 of them and capturing their horses. Having been commissioned by the new captain general of Old Castile, General Vives (Note: Vives himself had died at the end of April, just three months after being appointed.) to recruit troops from the province of Zamora, then occupied by the French, Sánchez had, by then, been able to recruit 1,200 men for the army.

In mid-July, at the head of 22 lancers, he captured 34 French hussars, including their captain and a sergeant. Two days later, he was promoted to captain and the Duke del Parque authorised him to form a squadron. Although the official name was the Lancers of Castille, they became known as Don Julián's Lancers. At the end of that same month, leading 100 horse, he attacked a French column of 94 hussars, killing 46 of them and capturing 43.

In October, Sánchez's horsemen fought at Tamames, as part of Duke del Parque's Army of the Left.

When General Pérez de Herrasti was given command of the garrison at Ciudad Rodrigo in October 1809, Sánchez, now a lieutenant colonel, provided 240 horse for carrying out sorties.

Sánchez's horsemen also fought at Alba de Tormes in November 1809.

=== 1810 ===
In February 1810, Sánchez was promoted to lieutenant colonel.

That same month, Pérez de Herrasti rejected Marshal Ney's demands for the surrender of the place which, together with the sorties carried out by Sánchez's horse, forced the French commander to return to his headquarters at the Castle of San Felices de los Gallegos. On one of those sorties, at the head of 60 horse he attacked a column of 500 dragoons, killing around 200 of them.

By the time Ney returned, the following 25 April, this time to lay siege, the Spanish garrison had been increased to 6,000 troops, including 400 artillerymen (Note: At the beginning of 1809, the previous governor of Ciudad Rodrigo, Ramon Blanco, had complained that he had no trained artillerymen. (Oman, 1903: footnote 304.)) and Sánchez's horse now numbered 340.

In another sortie, he led 200 horse through three siege lines, killing some 240 men and destroying their camp. The commanding officer of the Army of the Left, Marquis of La Romana, on recommending Sanchéz for a medal for that action, also pointed out that Sánchez had, throughout the siege, taken over 800 prisoners.

At the beginning of June, he was promoted to colonel. On a sortie towards the end of that month, his men attacked a column of 200 dragoons near El Bodón, killing 66 of them and making off with 54 horses.

Finally, given leave by Pérez de Herrasti to quit the town, on the night of 21–22 June, Sánchez crossed the bridge over the Agueda, broke through the lines of Marchand's division, and escaped to Craufurd's outpost at Almeida.

At the beginning of July, Sánchez was promoted to colonel of the Regiment of Castille Lancers. By the second half of 1810, Sanchez's band numbered 300 to 500 lancers and had become a major cause for concern for Kellermann. Sanchez was also in regular communication with Wellington, sending captured dispatches and providing intelligence.

That September, he fought minor actions at Barco de Ávila, Valdecasas, Muñoz and Alaejos, killing a total of 73 enemy troops and taking 32 horses. At the same time, he was organising the 1st Regiment of Lancers and the Battalion of Castille Cazadores, formed by 1,200 men that he was able to arm, uniform and mount with the spoils of his attacks.

Despite the efforts of General Thiébault, the French governor of the region, to hunt him down, Sánchez spent the winter of 1810 attacking convoys between Salamanca and Ciudad Rodrigo or between Ciudad Rodrigo and Almeida.

At the end of November, he was forced to retreat from a combat at Alaejos (Valladolid).

=== 1811 ===
At the beginning of February, his men attacked a convoy at Tamames, killing or wounding 28 men of the escort. He then sent the convoy, together with 100 cattle, to the needy Army of the Left at Badajoz. As a result of that action, a French division was sent out to capture him, and against which he was able to carry out a series of attacks and retreats.

In April 1811, Sánchez was given the command of the newly created Burgos Hussar Regiment.

At Wellington's behest, Sánchez stayed on the roads between Salamanca and Ciudad Rodrigo to prevent the movement of troops and convoys, sending General Erskine's Light Division and Arentschildt's brigade of cavalry up towards the Agueda, near Ciudad Rodrigo, to co-operate with the Spanish commander, the idea being that Sánchez would nofify them of the approach of any convoy and they would ford the river to intercept it. However, on 13 April, this failed due to Erskine's slow reaction. The French garrison having been revictualled, Wellington desisted in his idea of besieging the place, especially as he had no siege-train.

Massena's withdrawal from Portugal gave Sánchez the opportunity to attack the French columns and convoys, taking a total of 700 prisoners.

The following May, Sánchez's regiment took part in the Battle of Fuentes de Oñoro as part of Wellington's cavalry. However, the Spaniards were surprised at daybreak by two regiments of Montbrun's dragoons and withdrew without engaging the enemy, leaving it to two squadrons of the 14th Light Dragoons, that had been sent to reinforce them, to engage in a running battle. Despite Wellington's criticism of this behaviour on the battlefield, the English general continued to praise Sánchez, as he had done before and would continue to do after this battle. After the battle, Sánchez's troops chased the French troops in their withdraw, taking 105 prisoners.

During the summer of 1811, Sánchez had effectively cut communications between Ciudad Rodrigo and Salamanca, defeating any body of troops fewer than 400 men. With Ciudad Rodrigo now occupied by the French, Sánchez was able to attack their convoys and in June, at San Muñoz, his 200 horsemen, accompanied by 300 foot soldiers attacked a convoy protected by 600 grenadiers, and killing or taking prisoner 360 of them. Although provisions, escorted by a much larger force, managed to reach Ciudad Rodrigo in July, by the end of August these were again running low.

On 15 October, (Note: Sources differ, with some putting the date at 1 October. (Cassinello Pérez)) Sánchez captured the French governor of Ciudad Rodrigo, Renaud, and his escort. The following month his troops also made it difficult for Renaud's successor, General Barrié, to access the fortress.

Around this time, he had raised the 2nd Regiment of Lancers and the 2nd Battalion of Castille Cazadores. Towards the end of the year, Carlos de España, sent by General Castaños to the frontier of León, to recruit men from the province of Salamanca, set up his headquarters at Ledesma. There, he joined forces with Sánchez, and was able to raise some 3,000 men, enough to harass Thiébault. That November, the two commanders defeated the enemy forces at the action of Endrinal, and Sánchez attacked a convoy, killing or wounding 80 men of the escort, at Linares de Riofrio.

=== 1812 ===
Sánchez was promoted to brigadier in January 1812. In the first few months of that year, his cavalry numbered 1,200, now divided into the 1st and 2nd Lancers of Castille.

Joining the vanguard of Wellington's Anglo-Portuguese Army, Sánchez's brigade, now formally the 1st Brigade of General España's 3rd Division of General Castaños's 5th Army, participated in the combats leading up to the Battle of Salamanca, where it was incorporated into Lieutenant general Sir John Stapleton Cotton's Cavalry division. Following the battle, it chased the French towards Burgos, killing or capturing over 1,000 troops.

In September, as Wellington marched from Madrid to Burgos, Sánchez formed part of the vanguard and during the siege of the castle, his troops were stationed to the north to protect the sieging force. Sánchez formed the rearguard of Wellington's withdrawal to Portugal, and was able to prevent the capture of 1,500 fatigued Anglo-Portuguese troops that had fallen behind.

Towards the end of December, and the 1st Battalion of Castille Cazadores, he attacked a column of 1,500 French troops at Vitigudino, forcing them to retreat back to Ledesma.

=== 1813 ===
In May 1813, at the head of 1st Regiment of Lancers and an Artillery company, he joined the vanguard of the Anglo-Portuguese Army. In June he attacked and captured a detachment of dragoons at Castro Nuño, and later that month, he participated at the Battle of Vitoria. He then joined forces with Espoz y Mina at Pamplona and chased Marshal Clauzel's troops towards Aragón.

At the beginning of July, his troops entered Zaragoza with Espoz y Mina's Navarre Hussars.

In September 1813 he took the fortress at Fraga (Huesca).

== Post-war career ==
In 1816 he was appointed governor of Santoña, post he held until February 1823. The following April, the constitutional government sent him to join the Ejército de Operaciones stationed in the north of Spain to repel the French invasion of Hundred Thousand Sons of Saint Louis sent by the Holy Alliance to restore absolutism in Spain. On 18 April, at the head of his troops he was gravely wounded and taken prisoner. The Duke of Angoulême, nominal commander of the French forces, allowed him, on parole, to return to Madrid. Once the war was over, Fernando VII confined him to barracks at Salamanca, and the following December he was arrested and imprisoned for 27 months at Valladolid. On his release, at the beginning of 1827, he retired to his wife's estate at Etreros.
