= Julián Sánchez =

Julián Sánchez may refer to:

- Julián Sánchez (diver) (born 1988), Mexican diver
- Julián Sánchez (cyclist) (born 1980), Spanish road bicycle racer
- Julian Sanchez (writer) (born 1979), American writer
- Julián Sánchez García (1771–1832), Spanish guerrilla leader in the Peninsular War
- Julián Sánchez Melgar (born 1955), Spanish judge and prosecutor

== See also ==
- Julien Sanchez (born 1983), French politician
