= Combat of the Côa =

1810 combat during the Peninsular War

Battle of the Côa Valley
- Part of the Peninsular War
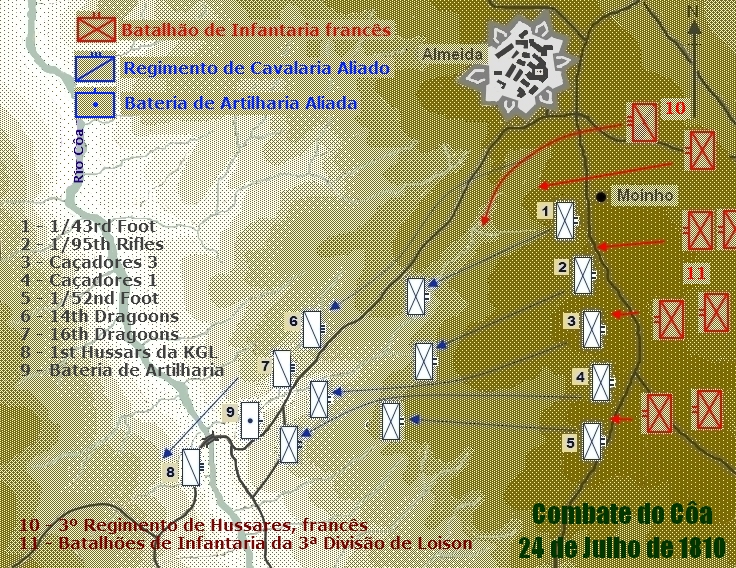
- Map containing the positions of the beginning of combat forces in the Coa and indication of movement of units.
Date	24 July 1810
Location	River Côa, Portugal 40.7261°N 6.9061°W
Result	French victory (Note: Successful completion of a tactical objective. Craufurd's strategic retreat.)

Belligerents
(First French Empire) France	United Kingdom; Portugal

Commanders and leaders
(First French Empire) Michel Ney (First French Empire) Louis H. Loison	(United Kingdom of Great Britain and Ireland) Robert Craufurd

Strength
5,550 (only engaged troops) (Note: 20,000 total force); 6 guns	5,300 (only engaged troops) (Note: 10,000 total force, as estimated by André Masséna.); 6 guns

Casualties and losses
Uncertain casualties, but heavy (Note: Ney's hasty assault on the bridge alone cost more than 500 men, as per one estimate. An older authority reports 520 casualties for the entire battle.) French sources: 117 killed 210 wounded British sources: ~520 killed and wounded or 1,000+ total	Uncertain casualties, but heavy (Note: In the last phase of the French offensive alone, during attempts to repel it, the British lost 333 men, as per one estimate. An older authority reports the same figure but for the entire battle.) British sources: 32 killed 182 wounded 29 missing or 316–333 killed, wounded, and captured/missing French sources: ~400 killed, including ~60 officers ~700 wounded ~400 captured a flag 2 guns

Peninsular War
Third French invasion:
1 Siege of Astorga March April 1810
2 Siege of Ciudad Rodrigo April 1810
3 Siege of Almeida July 1810
3.1 Blockade of Almeida April 1811
4 Battle of Bussaco September 1810
5 Torres Vedras protects Lisbon
6 Battle of Redinha March 1811
7 Battle of Sabugal April 1811
8 Battle of Fuentes de Oñoro May 1811

Location of Côa valley in Portugal

The Combat of the Côa (July 24, 1810; also referred to as Coa or Cõa) was a military engagement that occurred during the Peninsular War period of the Napoleonic Wars. It took place in the valley of the Côa River and it was the first significant battle for the new army of 65,000 men controlled by Marshal André Masséna, as the French prepared for their third invasion of Portugal.

As the British-Portuguese forces were outnumbered here, on July 22, General Arthur Wellesley, 1st Duke of Wellington sent Brigadier-General Robert Craufurd a letter, saying that he (Wellington) was "not desirous of engaging in an affair beyond the Coa." On July 24, Craufurd's Light Division, with 4,200 infantry, 1,100 cavalry, and six guns, was surprised by the sight of 20,000 troops under Marshal Michel Ney, of which only about a quarter were thrown into combat by him, namely parts of the Loison division, which also had up to six guns. Rather than retreat and cross the river as ordered by Wellington, Craufurd chose to engage the French, narrowly avoiding disaster.

The French objective was to force the Light Division back across the Côa in order to besiege Almeida. Ney succeeded after hard fighting, but then launched a costly fruitless assault across the Côa, suffering heavy casualties. Craufurd's division was forced to continue its withdrawal further that night.

== Background ==
The Third Portuguese campaign started with the construction of the Lines of Torres Vedras and the Siege of Ciudad Rodrigo (26 April – 10 July 1810). Then a meeting engagement took place at Barquilla (11 July), in which Craufurd's cavalrymen unsuccessfully attacked the French infantry.

== Battle of the River Côa ==
=== Order of battle ===
British-Portuguese forces were:

- Light Division: Major General Robert Craufurd
- 1st Brigade: Lieut-Col Sydney Beckwith
  - 1/43rd Foot
  - 1/95th Regiment of Foot (Rifles) (1/2 battalion)
  - 3rd Portuguese Caçadores
- 2nd Brigade: Lieut-Col Robert Barclay
  - 1/52nd Foot
  - 1/95th Regiment of Foot (Rifles) (1/2 battalion)
  - 1st Portuguese Caçadores
- Cavalry Brigade: Brig-Gen George Anson
  - 14th Light Dragoons (3 squadrons)
  - 16th Light Dragoons (2 squadrons)
  - 1st King's German Legion Hussars
- Chestnut Troop, Royal Horse Artillery.

The units of Ney's VI Corps included:

- Infantry Division: Maj-Gen Julien Augustin Joseph Mermet (7,600)
  - Brigade: Brig-Gen Martial Maison-Rouge
    - 25th Light Infantry Regiment (2 battalions)
    - 27th Line Infantry Regiment (3 battalions)
  - Brigade: Brig-Gen Mathieu Delabassé
    - 50th Line Infantry Regiment (3 battalions)
    - 59th Line Infantry Regiment (3 battalions)
- Infantry Division: Maj-Gen Louis Henri Loison (6,800)
  - Brigade: Brig-Gen Édouard Simon
    - Legion du Midi (1 battalion)
    - Hanoverian Legion (2 battalions)
    - 26th Line Infantry Regiment (3 battalions)
  - Brigade: Brig-Gen Claude François Ferey
    - 32nd Light Infantry Regiment (1 battalion)
    - 66th Line Infantry Regiment (3 battalions)
    - 82nd Line Infantry Regiment (2 battalions)
- Corps Cavalry Brigade: Brig-Gen Auguste Lamotte (1,000)
  - 3rd Hussar Regiment
  - 15th Chasseurs à Cheval Regiment
- Reserve Cavalry Brigade: Brig-Gen Charles Gardanne (1,300)
  - 15th Dragoon Regiment
  - 25th Dragoon Regiment
- Artillery: four foot and two horse artillery batteries

=== French offensive ===
Craufurd committed a serious tactical error by choosing to fight with an unfordable river at his back while badly outnumbered. As such, in the early hours of 24 July, after a night of torrential rain, Ney sent forth Ferey and Loison's division to engage the allies.

A company of the 95th Rifles came under fire from French artillery as they moved in to attack. French voltigeurs of the 32nd then came up and took the fight to the bayonet, and the heavily outnumbered British broke and fled. The guns of Almeida opened fire on the 95th Rifles, mistaking them for French because of their dark uniforms. They then fell under attack by the French 3rd Hussars, supported by two companies of dragoons. British troops of the 43rd came to assist them. Though fierce fighting broke out, the French advance was halted. Despite orders from Wellington to fall back across the river Côa, Craufurd decided to hold his ground as more French arrived and began to deploy in formation.

The 15th Chasseurs a Cheval then charged to the south to outflank the British 52nd Light Infantry, while Ferey's French brigade attacked the British positioned near a windmill positioned at the British right, advancing through rough-terrain while Almeida's guns were firing upon them. The French infantry charged the British with fixed bayonet and, under mounting pressure, the allies began to fall back, isolating themselves from the 43rd Light Infantry under attack by the 15th Chasseurs. The 3rd Hussars came into the fight and Craufurd's men took heavy casualties. All this time, while Ney's assaults were being slowed by awful terrain, Almeida was slowly being isolated from the allied force.

Craufurd, realising his situation that the French were threatening his only escape (the bridge crossing the river Côa), ordered a withdrawal across the river Côa, with the British 52nd and 43rd Light Infantry as well as the 95th Rifles protecting their retreat. For the British, matters only became worse. A supply wagon turned over and caused a traffic jam in the retreat across the bridge. The French were gradually driving back the British divisions protecting the withdrawal.

Craufurd then ordered these troops to fall back and take position the heights overlooking the bridge and hold that position until the retreat had been made. The French took the heights, but in a move that took the Ney's forces completely by surprise the allies made an assault and held their opponents at bay long enough for the main body of the British-Portuguese to make it across to the other side of the river Côa.

=== Assault across the Côa ===
With the French driving the Light Division back, Ney then attempted attacking across the Côa. In the first attempt, grenadiers of the 66th surged towards the bridge under a hail of musketry and cannon fire, failing to get more than halfway across the bridge. The second more strongly-pressed offensive was made by the Elite Chasseurs de la Siège light infantry. Oman writes that they had "flung themselves at the bridge, and pushed on till it was absolutely blocked by the bodies of the killed and the wounded, and till they themselves had been almost literally exterminated, for out of a battalion of little more than 300 men 90 were killed and 147 wounded in less than ten minutes." The final attack was once more led by the 66th which was beaten off with little difficulty.

=== Results ===
The battle ended with the French having, despite the setback at the bridge, driven the Light Division from the field. Having been beaten back and only narrowly escaped a total rout, Crauford's forces withdrew at midnight, leaving Masséna free rein to lay siege to Almeida.

Napier and Oman stated that the British Light Division held off the entire 20,000-strong force under Ney. However, it was only Ferey and Loison's division that actually engaged the Light Division. French forces engaged were estimated at between 5,550 pitched against 5,300 British-Portuguese.

Casualties are hard to determine. Both the French and the British-Portuguese were biased. For example, Imperial propaganda reported allied casualties to be at 1,200, while many British sources claimed the loss of 36 killed and 189 wounded as well as 83 missing. On the other hand, French casualties are easier to determine, as both the allies and French estimated around five hundred dead or wounded. The great majority of these casualties were due to Ney's futile attack across the bridge.

== Aftermath ==
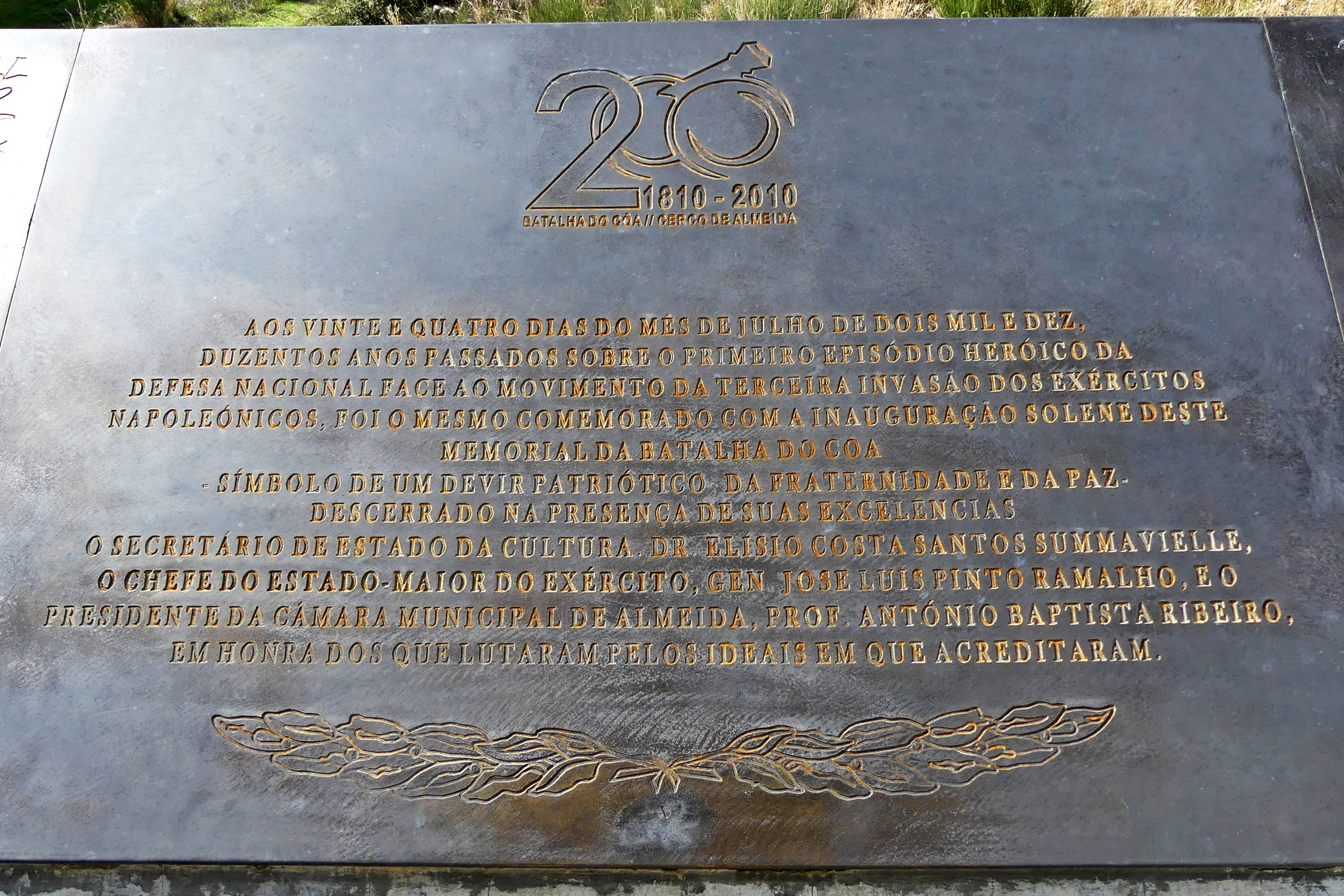
Information board to commemorate the resistance opposed by the Anglo-Luso coalition to the third invasion of Portugal by the Napoleonic regime.

The Third Portuguese campaign proceeded with the Battle of Bussaco.

== Notes ==
Preceded by Combat of Barquilla (1810)	Napoleonic Wars; Combat of the Côa	Succeeded by Siege of Almeida (1810)
