= Ramón Blanco Criado =

Spanish army officer (1750–1821)

- Born: 5 March 1750; Ponferrada, León
- Died: 9 June 1821 (aged 58) Villar del Rey, Badajóz
- Conflicts: Peninsular War

Ramón Blanco Criado (1763–1821) was a Spanish military commander.

== Early career ==
Blanco Criado enlisted as a midshipman at Ferrol in 1777, embarking in May 1779 on board the St Vincent as part of the squadron Antonio González de Arce led to the English Channel. He was promoted to alférez de fragata (Note: In the Spanish Navy, a junior rank between midshipman and sub-lieutenant.) the following July. He was promoted to Lieutenant (navy) in 1787.

In 1793, during the War of the First Coalition, he served on board the Santa Leocadia in the Cantabrian Sea. In 1797 he sailed the following year from Cadiz as second-in-command of the San Juan Nepomuceno and shortly thereafter sailed under the orders of Churruca on board the Conquistador to Brest, where he stayed until the signing of the Treaty of Amiens in 1802 and was promoted to frigate captain that year.

Poor health led him to transfer to the army and he was appointed teniente del rey (Note: Similar to the British 'lord-lieutenant'.) of Ciudad Rodrigo in 1804.

== Peninsular War ==
At the start of the war, Blanco Criado was promoted to Infantry brigadier and appointed governor of Ciudad Rodrigo. In mid-January 1809, he wrote to the Junta complaining that the fortress, which required a garrison of 4,000, then consisted of 1,400 men: six companies of urban militia, plus a recently incorporated battalion of 500 men, and that he had no trained artillerymen. The following October, the Duke del Parque sent him to Badajoz and he was appointed governor of Olivenza in December 1809, post he held until March 1810, when he stepped down due to deficient situation of that place. He was then sent back to Ciudad Rodrigo, again as teniente del rey, serving under the new commander of the garrison, Field marshal Andrés Pérez de Herrasti during the siege. At the end of the siege he was taken prisoner to Bayonne, where he remained until the end of the war.

== Post-war career ==
On his return to Spain, Blanco Criado was promoted to field marshal (July 1814).
