= Andrés Pérez de Herrasti =

Spanish army officer (1750–1818)

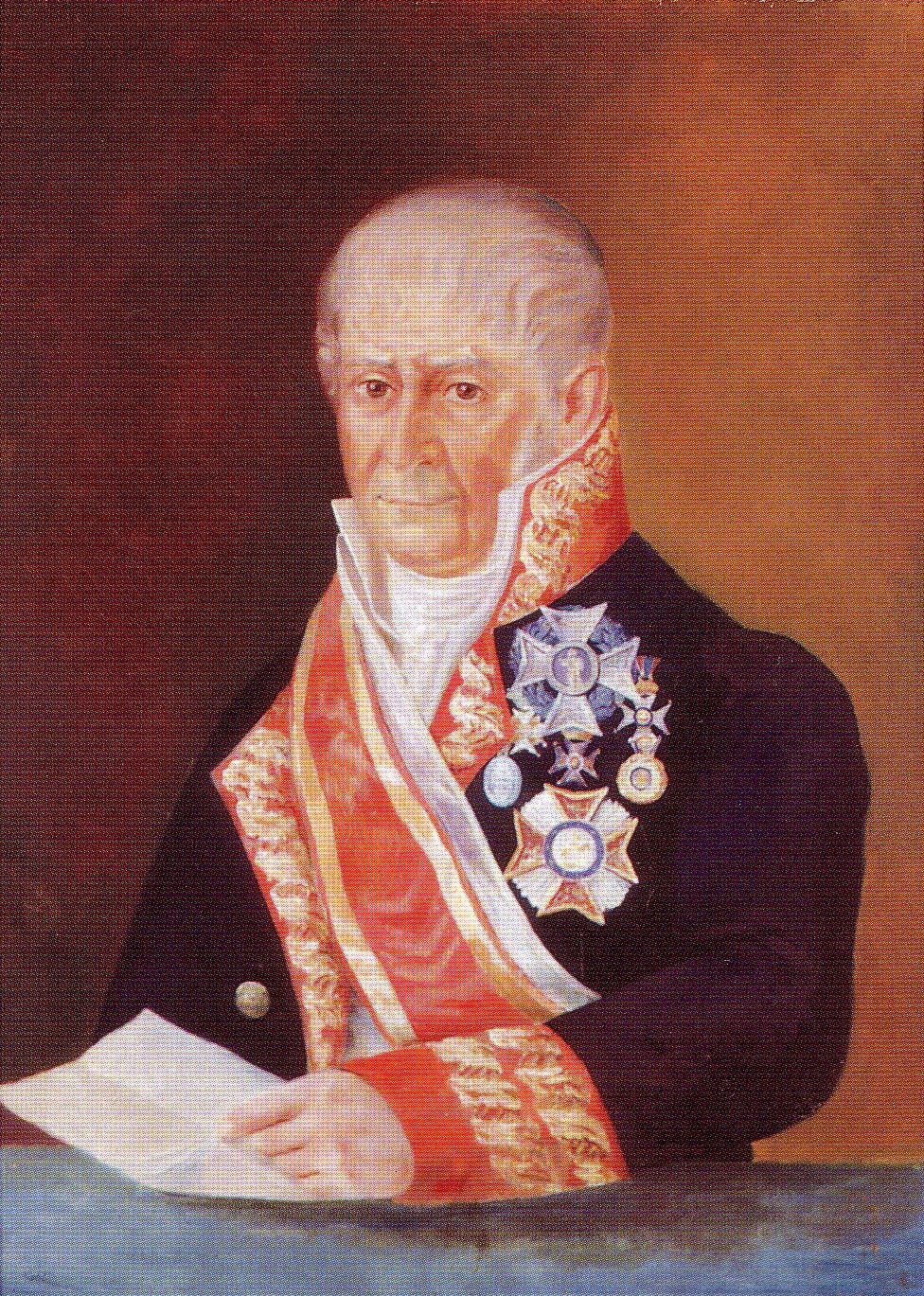
- Born: 5 March 1750; Granada, Andalusia
- Died: 24 January 1818 (aged 67) Barcelona
- Conflicts: American Revolutionary War; Great Siege of Gibraltar; War of the Pyrenees; Battle of Mas Deu; Battle of Perpignan; Battle of Millas; Battle of Truillas; Second Battle of Boulou; Battle of Banyuls dels Aspre; Defence of Pla del Rey; War of the Oranges; Peninsular War; Battle of Tudela; Combat of Tarancón; Siege of Ciudad Rodrigo

Andrés Pérez de Herrasti y Pérez del Pulgar (1750–1818) was a Spanish military commander.

== Early career ==
After enlisting as a cadet in the Provincial Regiment of Granada in 1762, Pérez de Herrasti transferred to the Royal Guards Corps in 1764, seeing action in Algeria in 1775. Promoted to second lieutenant in 1779, he participated in the blockade and siege of Gibraltar until 1783. Promoted two years later to lieutenant, he saw action at the siege of Oran in 1791 and, from April 1793, in the War of the Pyrenees at Masdeu, Perpignan, Millas, Trouillas, Bolou and Banyuls dels Aspres, by which time he had been promoted to captain. In 1794 his battalion was beaten back at the defence of Pla del Rey and Pérez de Herrasti was taken prisoner.

Promoted to brigadier in 1795, he again saw action during the War of the Oranges, at Borba and Villaviciosa.

In 1807 Pérez de Herrasti was given interim command of the 1st Battalion of his regiment and sent to Portugal, returning to Spain in March 1808. That same month he took part in the Mutiny of Aranjuez.

== Peninsular War ==
Stationed at Vicálvaro, just outside Madrid, when the Dos de Mayo Uprising took place, he was prohibited from moving into the capital by the president of the Council of Castile, Infante Antonio Pascual of Spain, who sent him to join General Castaños's troops stationed in La Rioja.

That November, he saw action at Tudela and, the following month, at the combat of Tarancón where, at the head of two hundred men, he managed to repel two attacks by 800 French horse, in reward for which he was promoted to field marshal.

In March 1809 Pérez de Herrasti was incorporated into the Army of Galicia and that October given command of Ciudad Rodrigo, with a garrison of 5,500 troops plus 240 horse under the command of lieutenant colonel Julián Sánchez, for carrying out sorties. (Note: The fortress, which required a garrison of 4,000, had until shortly before consisted of 1,400 men: six companies of urban militia, plus a recently incorporated battalion of 500 men. (Oman, 1903: p. 258.))

In February 1810, Pérez de Herrasti rejected Marshal Ney's demands for the surrender of the place which, together with the sorties carried out by Sánchez's horse, forced the French commander to return to his headquarters at the Castle of San Felices de los Gallegos.

The following 25 April, Ney returned, this time to lay siege. In the meantime, the Spanish garrison had been increased to 6,000 troops, including 400 artillerymen (Note: At the beginning of 1809, the previous governor of Ciudad Rodrigo, Ramon Blanco, had complained that he had no trained artillerymen. (Oman, 1903: footnote 304.)) and Sánchez's horse now numbered 340.

At the end of the siege he was taken prisoner to Bayonne, where he remained until the end of the war.

== Post-war career ==
On his return to Spain, he was promoted to lieutenant general in July 1814 and that same month appointed military governor of Barcelona, post he held at his death. In 1815 he was also, briefly, interim captain general of Catalonia.
