= Siege of Almeida (1810) =

1810 siege during the Peninsular War

Siege of Almeida 1810
- Part of Peninsular War
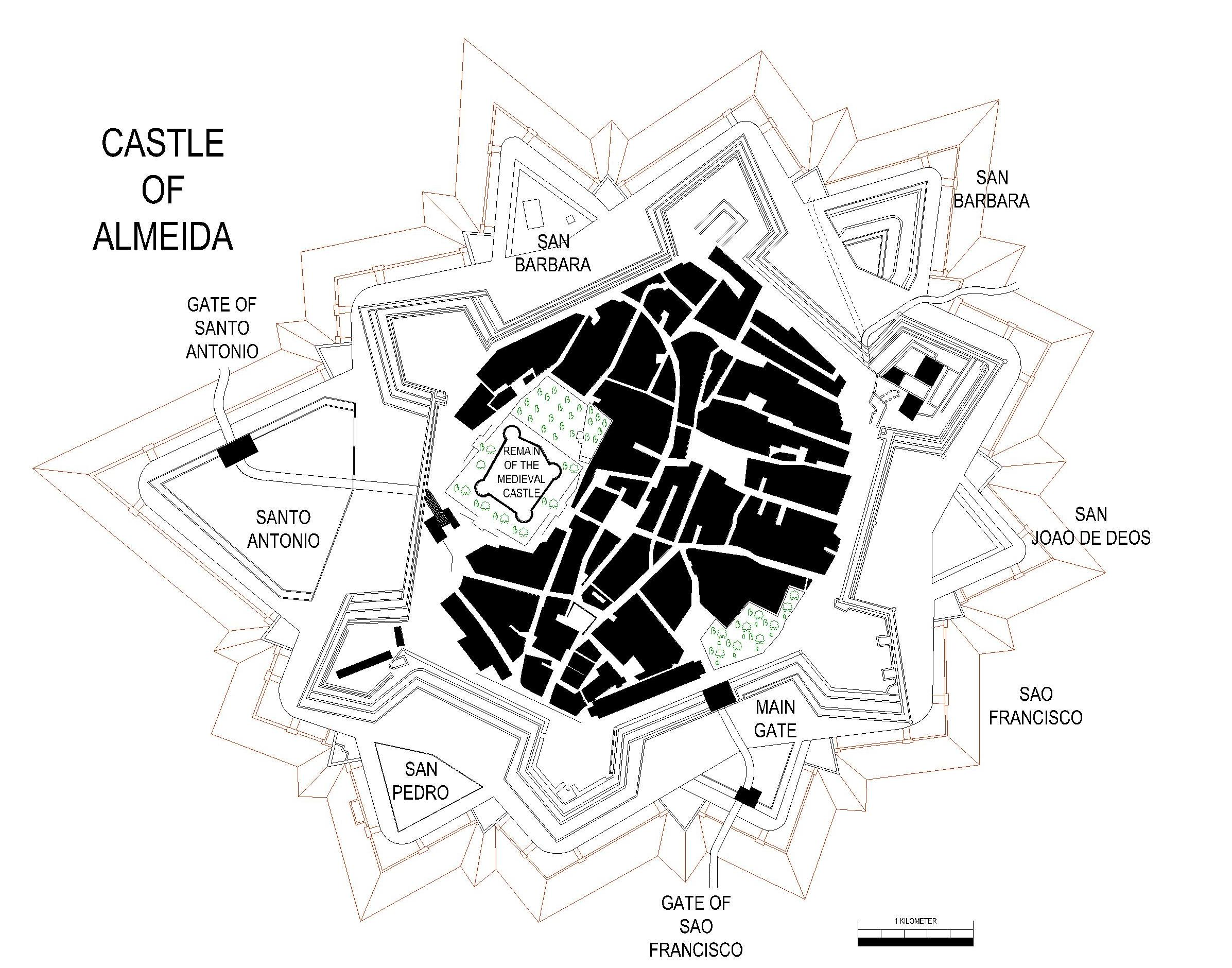
- The Fortress of Almeida
Date	24 July – 27 August 1810
Location	Almeida, Portugal 40.7261°N 6.9061°W
Result	French victory

Belligerents
(First French Empire) France	Portugal

Commanders and leaders
(First French Empire) André Masséna (First French Empire) Michel Ney	William Cox

Strength
16,000–18,000 men	4,500–6,000 men

Casualties and losses
700	6,000; 174 guns

Peninsular war: Portugal
1807 1808 1809 1810 1811

In the siege of Almeida, Portugal, the French corps of Marshal Michel Ney captured the border fortress from Brigadier General William Cox's Portuguese garrison. This action was fought in the summer of 1810 during the Peninsular War portion of the Napoleonic Wars. Almeida is located in eastern Portugal, near the border with Spain.

== Background ==
Lying on a main invasion route from Ciudad Rodrigo to Lisbon, the Castle Fortress of Almeida was invested by a 65,000-man army under Marshal André Masséna in the third French invasion of Portugal. The previous day the French forces had pushed back the Anglo-Portuguese Army at the Battle of the Côa. The 50,000-man Anglo-Portuguese Army under General Lord Wellington now held the far bank of the Coa. However, the river's banks were steep, with only two bridges, and the French 6th Corps guarded the crossings, so the Anglo-Portuguese Army were unable to retake the crossings to relieve Almeida.

== Siege ==
Fresh from the successful siege of Ciudad Rodrigo, the French army laid siege to Almeida on July 25, 1810. Brigadier-General William Cox commanded a 4,000-man Portuguese garrison of three battalions of militia, from Arganil, Trancoso and Vizeu. Some regular Portuguese forces were also present, including 1,200 soldiers of the 24th Infantry Regiment, a squadron of the 11th Cavalry Regiment and over 400 gunners. The defences of Almeida were in better repair and stronger than Ciudad Rodrigo which the French had recently taken. In particular, there were over 100 artillery pieces, of which 40 were 18-pounders or heavier, and most were in protected casemates. The siege was conducted by the 14,000 infantry, 1,000 cavalry, 1,000 artillerists and 100 cannon of the VI Corps under the command of Marshal Michel Ney. In addition, General Jean-Andoche Junot lay in reserve nearby with his VIII Corps .

The French received siege supplies from Ciudad Rodrigo on August 15, and started to dig trench lines to the south-east of the town, facing the San Pedro bastion. The siege train was well supplied with guns; as well as the existing French ones, it also included captured Spanish guns from Ciudad Rodrigo. By August 24, the French lines had eleven batteries in place, with over 50 guns. Throughout, the Portuguese defenders had fired upon the French, with little effect. When the French bombardment opened on August 26 at 6 AM, several quarters of the town were quickly set on fire, and the defending guns of the nearest three batteries overwhelmed. However, the defences held. The governor was confident in withstanding the assault, until a shell made a freak hit. The great magazine in the castle had been used through the day to supply the defenders, and at some point a leaky powder keg had left a trail of powder leading up to the courtyard. At around 7 PM, one French shell landed in the courtyard, igniting a gunpowder trail that led through the still open door, and set off a chain reaction into the magazine. The ensuing explosion killed 600 defenders and wounded 300 more. The castle that housed the gunpowder was razed and sections of the defenses were damaged, leaving a crater still visible today. Unable to reply to the French cannonade without gunpowder, Cox was forced to capitulate the following day with the survivors of the blast and 100 cannon. The French lost 58 killed and 320 wounded during the operation. The next action was the Battle of Bussaco.

== Cultural reference ==
The siege forms the climax of Bernard Cornwell's Sharpe's Gold, in which Richard Sharpe is credited with the destruction of the ammunition magazine, an act intended to deliberately cut short the siege so that he could leave the city and bring Lord Wellington the finances needed to complete the Lines of Torres Vedras.

== See also ==
- List of the largest artificial non-nuclear explosions

== Notes ==
Preceded by Combat of the Côa	Napoleonic Wars; Siege of Almeida (1810	Succeeded by Battle of Bussaco
