= Aldea del Obispo =

- municipality
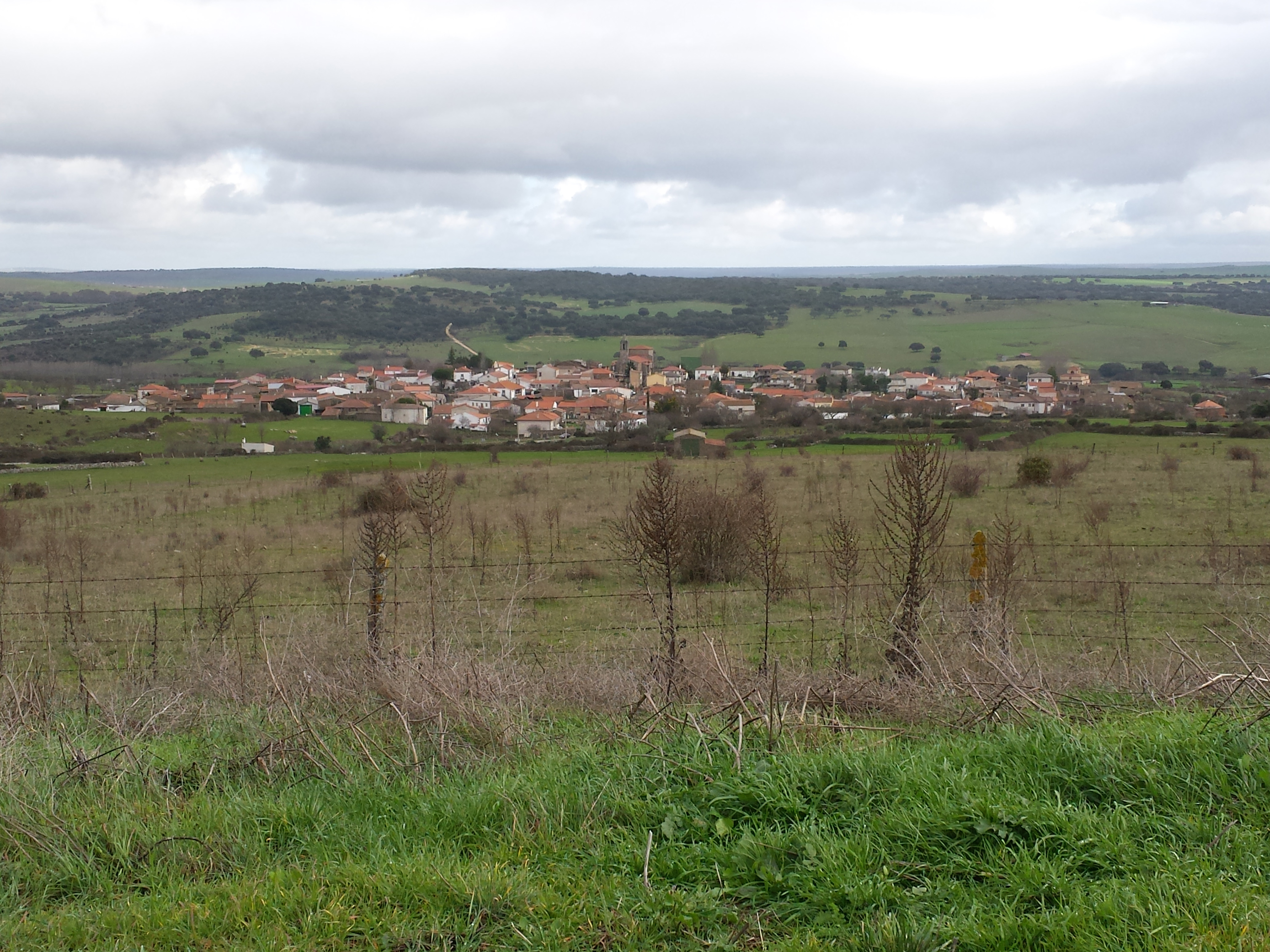

- Coat of arms

- Location in Salamanca

- Location in Spain
- Coordinates: 40°42′26″N 6°47′32″W
- Country: Spain
- Autonomous community: Castile and León
- Province: Salamanca
- Comarca: Comarca de Ciudad Rodrigo
- Subcomarca: Campo de Argañán

Government
  - Mayor: Rosa Baz (Spanish Socialist Workers' Party)

Area
  - Total: 41.92 km^{2} (16.19 sq mi)
- Elevation: 692 m (2,270 ft)

Population (2025-01-01)
  - Total: 245
  - Density: 5.84/km^{2} (15.1/sq mi)
- Time zone: UTC+1 (CET)
  - Summer (DST): UTC+2 (CEST)
- Postal code: 37488

Aldea del Obispo is a village and municipality in the province of Salamanca, western Spain, part of the autonomous community of Castile-Leon.

== Economy ==
The local economy is dominated by agriculture primarily the growth of herbs.

== Immigration ==
Aldea del Obispo generated much emigration to Latin America. Many families well known today in Brazil and other Latin American countries hail from Aldea del Obispo.

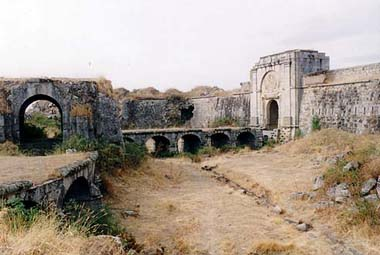
Castle of Real Fuerte de la Concepción, was a star fortress on the Spanish-Portuguese border.
