= Battle of Bussaco =

1810 battle of the Peninsular War

- Part of the Peninsular War
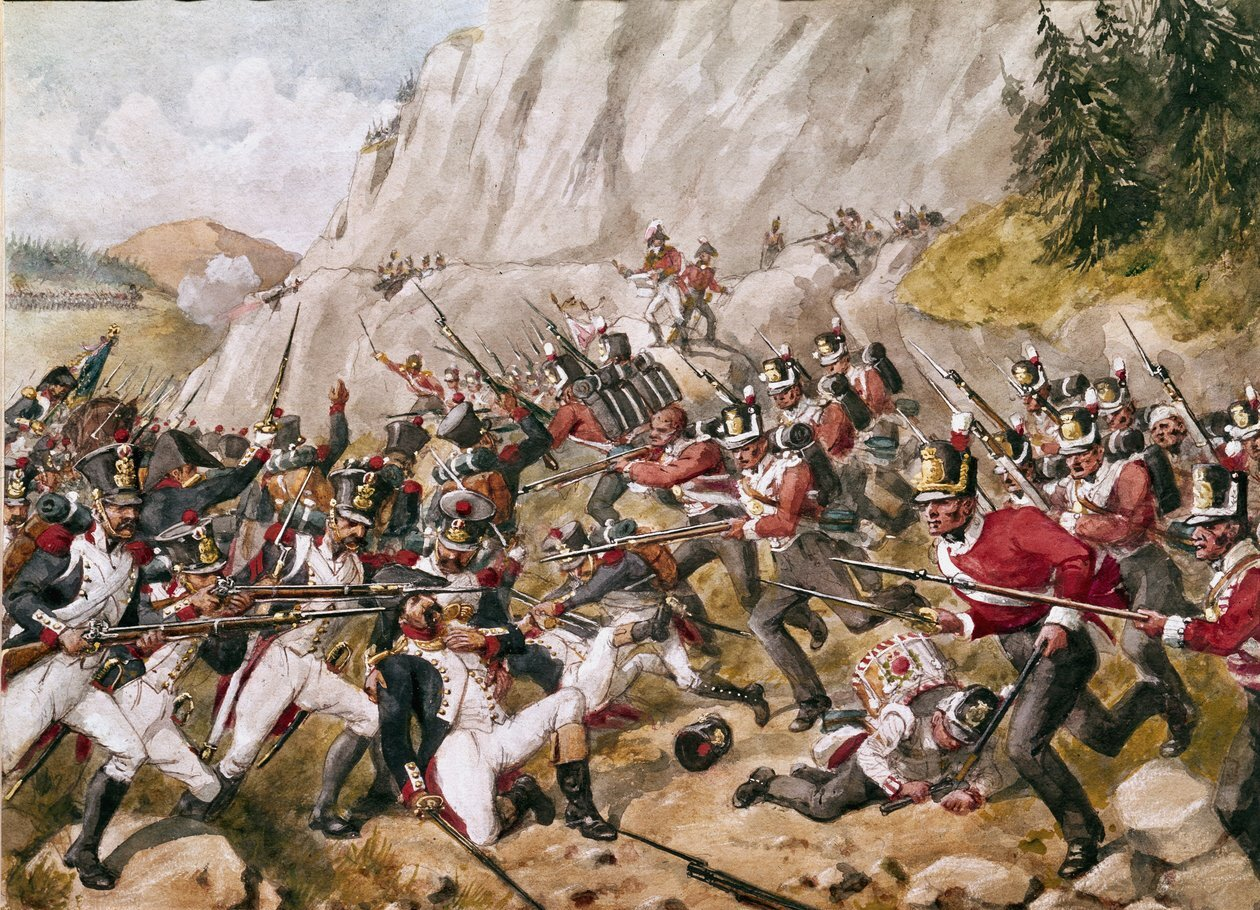
- Illustration of the battle
Date	27 September 1810
Location	Bussaco, Portugal 40°20′N 8°20′W
Result	Anglo-Portuguese victory (Note: The Allies repelled the attacks, although they were forced to abandon their defensive position after Masséna outflanked it, which means that the battle was only a tactical victory.)

Belligerents
United Kingdom; Portugal	France

Commanders and leaders
(United Kingdom of Great Britain and Ireland) Viscount Wellington (Kingdom of Portugal) Luís do Rego	(First French Empire) André Masséna (First French Empire) Michel Ney (First French Empire) Jean Reynier

Strength
32,000–35,765	45,774–58,000

Casualties and losses
1,252–1,356 killed or wounded	2,456–4,500 killed or wounded

Peninsular war: Portugal
1807 1808 1809 1810 1811

The Battle of Buçaco (pronounced [buˈsaku]) or Bussaco was fought on 27 September 1810 during the Peninsular War in the Portuguese mountain range of Serra do Buçaco, resulting in the defeat of French forces by Lord Wellington's Anglo-Portuguese Army. Having occupied the heights of Bussaco with a total of 26,843 British and 25,429 Portuguese troops, Wellington was attacked five times successively by invasion force of 65,050 French under Marshal André Masséna. Masséna was uncertain as to the disposition and strength of the opposing forces because Wellington had deployed them on the reverse slope of the ridge, where they could neither be easily seen nor easily softened up with artillery.

The actual assaults were made by the corps of Marshal Michel Ney and General of Division (Major General) Jean Reynier, but after much fierce fighting they failed to dislodge the allied forces and were driven off after having lost up to 4,500 men against up to 1,356 Anglo-Portuguese casualties. Before this battle, Masséna made no attempt to bypass Wellington's position or conduct further reconnaissance, contrary to his officers' fears. However, Wellington was ultimately forced to withdraw to the Lines of Torres Vedras after his positions were outflanked by Masséna's troops.

== Background ==
The Third Portuguese campaign had started with the construction of the Lines of Torres Vedras and the Siege of Ciudad Rodrigo.

=== Operations ===
In 1810, Emperor Napoleon ordered Masséna to drive the British from Portugal. Accordingly, the French marshal began the siege of Ciudad Rodrigo in April. The Spanish garrison held out until 9 July when the fortress fell. The Battle of the Côa was fought soon after. The Siege of Almeida ended suddenly with a massive explosion of the fortress magazine on 26 August. With all obstacles cleared from their path, the French could march on Lisbon in strength.

It was important to delay the French until the defences being built around Lisbon, the Lines of Torres Vedras, could be completed. Using selective demolition of bridges and roads, Wellington restricted the choice of routes the French could use and slowed their advance. At the end of September, they found Wellington's army drawn up on the ridge of Bussaco. The ridge, which at its highest rising to 549 metres (1,801 ft), lies at a right angle to the main road to Coimbra and thence to Lisbon, providing one of the few and certainly the best defensive position on the French route of march.

=== Allied organisation ===
Wellington had brought together six British infantry divisions:

- the Light, under Brigadier General Robert Craufurd
- the 1st, led by Major General Brent Spencer
- the 2nd, commanded by Major General Rowland Hill
- the 3rd, under Major General Thomas Picton, with attached Portuguese brigade
- the 4th, led by Major General Lowry Cole, with attached Portuguese brigade
- the 5th, under Major General James Leith, with attached Portuguese brigade

In addition, the Portuguese Army (newly re-trained by the British under the direction of Lieutenant General William Carr Beresford) supplied a two-brigade Portuguese infantry division under Major General John Hamilton, and three independent Portuguese brigades led by Brigadier Generals Denis Pack, Alexander Campbell and John Coleman.

Brigadier Generals George De Grey, John Slade, George Anson and Henry Fane led four British cavalry brigades, plus four regiments of Portuguese cavalry. In batteries of six guns each, there were six British (Ross RHA, Bull RHA, Thompson, Lawson, two unknown), two King's German Legion (Rettberg, Cleeves) and five Portuguese (Rozierres, Da Cunha Preto, Da Silva, Freira, Sousa) batteries under Brigadier General Edward Howorth.

The Anglo-Portuguese army numbered 50,000, with half being Portuguese.

=== French organisation ===
Masséna's army of 60,000 included the II Corps under Reynier, the VI Corps led by Ney, the VIII Corps under Major General Jean Andoche Junot and a cavalry reserve led by Major General Louis Pierre, Count Montbrun. The divisions of Major Generals Pierre Hugues Victoire Merle and Étienne Heudelet de Bierre made up Reynier's corps. Ney's corps had three divisions under Major Generals Jean Marchand, Julien Mermet and Louis Loison. Junot had the divisions of Major General Bertrand Clauzel and Mag Gen Jean-Baptiste Solignac. Each French corps had the standard brigade of light cavalry. General of Brigade (Brigadier General) Jean Baptiste Eblé, Masséna's artillery chief, commanded 112 guns.

=== Plans ===
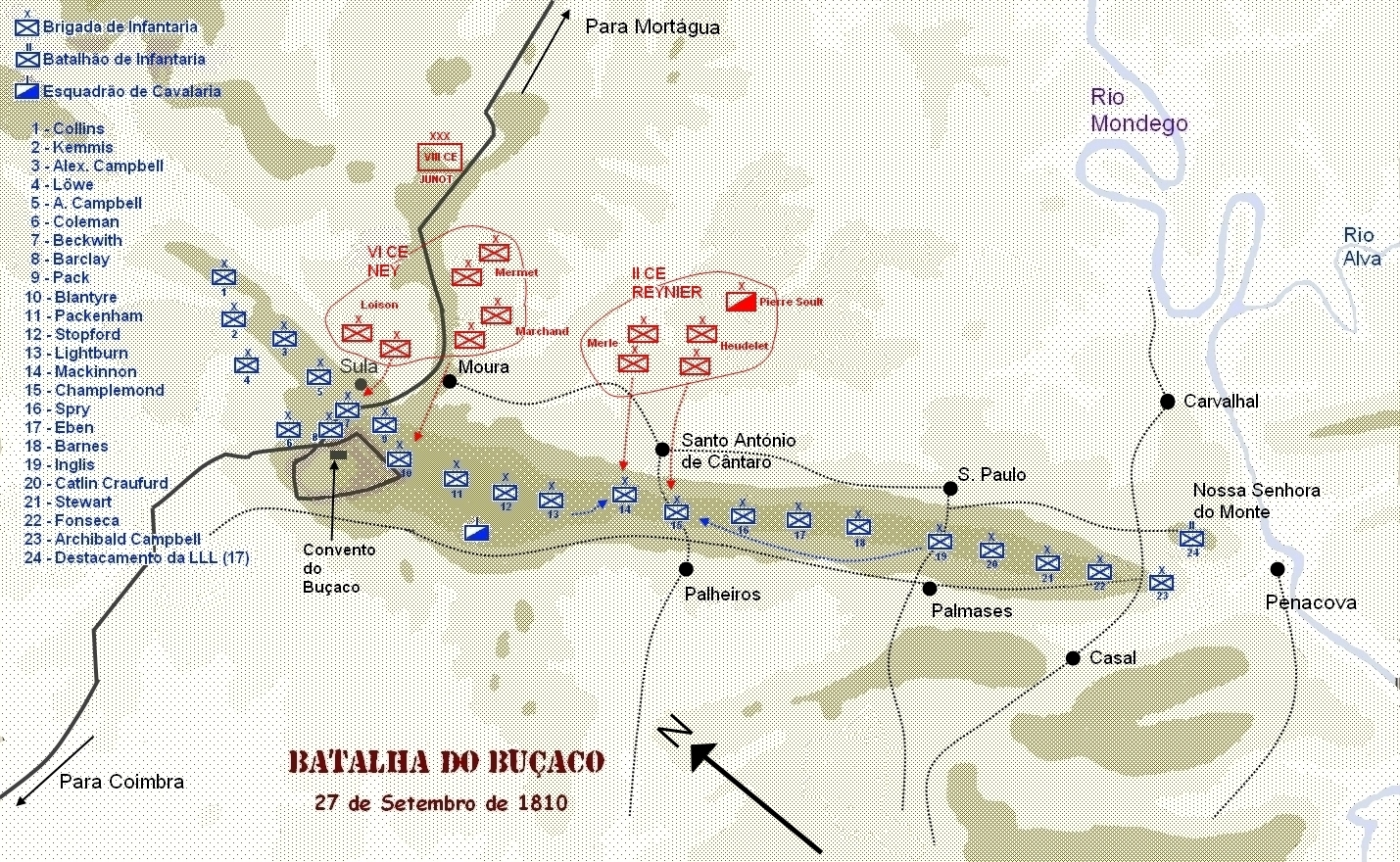
Plan of the battle

Wellington posted his army along the crest of Bussaco Ridge, facing east. To improve his lateral communications, he had previously ordered his four officers from the Royal Corps of Engineers to cut a road that ran the length of the ridge on the reverse slope. Cole held the left (north) flank. Next came Craufurd, Spencer, Picton and Leith. Hill held the right (south) flank with Hamilton's men attached.

Masséna, believing he easily outnumbered the British and goaded by Ney and other officers to attack the British position rather than go around it, ordered a reconnaissance of the steep ridge. Very few of Wellington's troops were visible, as they remained on the reverse slope and were ordered not to light cooking fires. The French general planned to send Reynier at the centre of the ridge, which he believed to be the British right flank. Once the II Corps attack showed some signs of success, Masséna would launch Ney's corps at the British along the main road. The VIII Corps stood behind the VI Corps in reserve. While Ney announced that he was ready to attack and conquer, Reynier suddenly had second thoughts, predicting his attack would be beaten. An older authority states the following:

French officers at the foot of the heights were by no means so confident. It seemed to them that it was no light matter to order their infantry even to climb the ascent, without fighting an enemy at the top. […] Some say that Junot, Reynier, and Ney were unanimous for an immediate attack; others that they were unanimous against it; others again that Junot and Reynier were for it and Ney against it. It seems most probable that the first of these three accounts is the true one; but that the regimental officers were of one mind in the contrary view.

— Sir John Fortescue

== Battle ==
=== II Corps attack ===
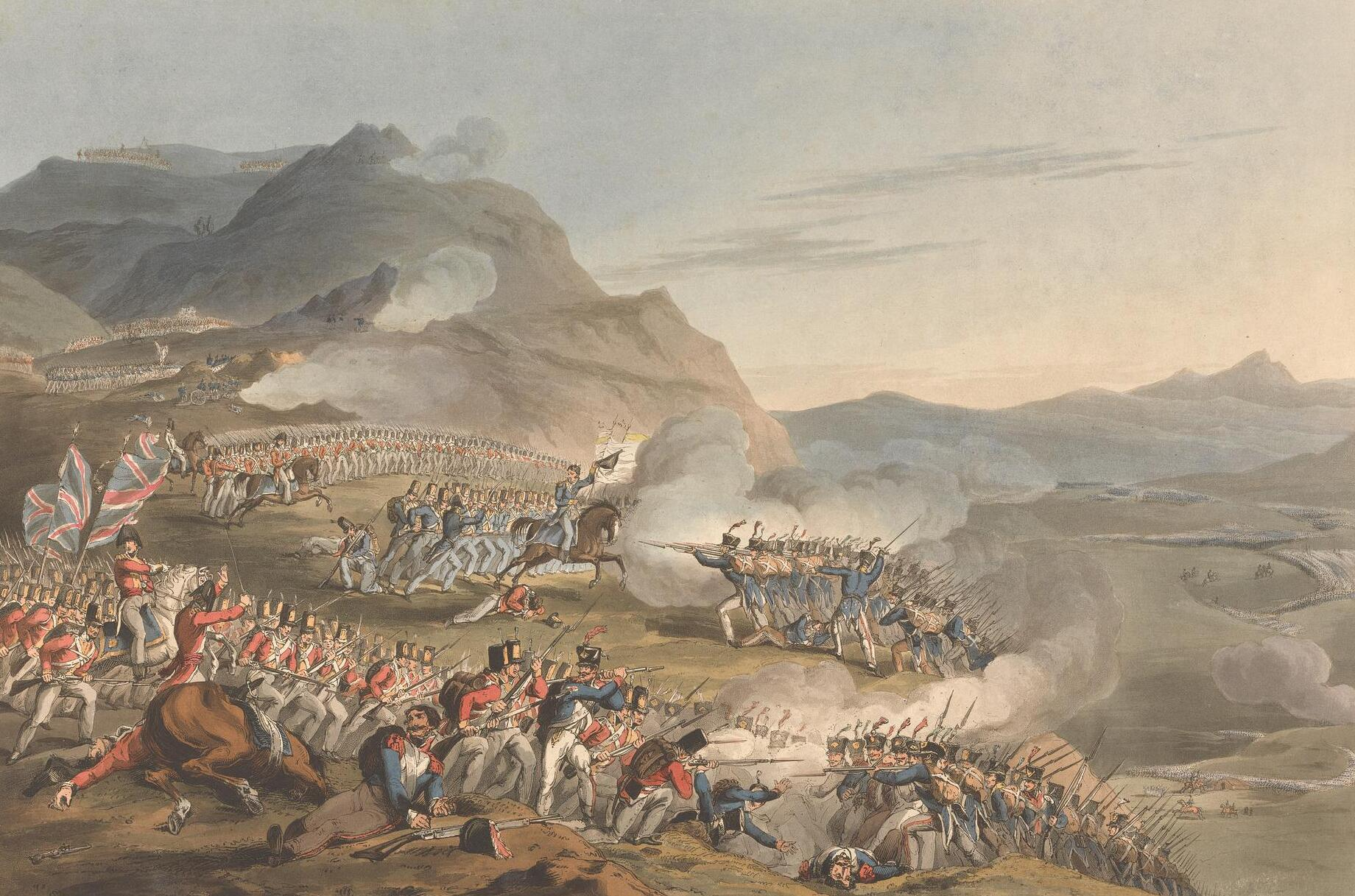
British and Portuguese infantry deployed in line on the ridge at Bussaco

Reynier's troops struck in the early morning mist. Heudelet sent his leading brigade straight up the slope in a formation one company wide and eight battalions deep. When the leading regiment reached the top of the ridge, they found themselves facing the 74th Foot and two Portuguese battalions in line, plus 12 cannon. The French tried to change formation from column into line. Pelet says, "The column began to deploy as if at an exercise." But the allies brought intense musketry to bear. Soon, the French infantrymen were thrown into confusion. However, they clung to a precarious toehold on the ridge.

Several hundred yards to the north, Merle's division thrust up the ridge in a similar formation. Picton hurriedly massed his defenders by using the ridgetop road. Met at the crest by the 88th Foot, the 45th Foot and two Portuguese battalions in a concave line, the French tried unsuccessfully to deploy into line. Crushed by converging fire, the French fled down the slope. Merle was wounded, while Brigadier General Jean François Graindorge fell mortally wounded. Wellington rode up to Colonel Alexander Wallace of the 88th and remarked, "Wallace, I have never witnessed a more gallant charge."

Seeing Heudelet's second brigade standing immobile at the foot of the ridge, Reynier rode up to BG Maximilien Foy and demanded an immediate attack. With the Allies out of position after defeating the first two attacks, Foy hit a weak spot in their defences. Fortuitously, the French struck the least prepared unit in the Allied army—a Portuguese militia unit—and routed it. But the morning mist cleared, revealing no enemies in front of the British right flank. Wellington had already ordered Leith to shift his men to the north to assist Picton. Before Foy's men could consolidate their gain, they were attacked by the 9th Foot and 38th Foot of Leith and some of Picton's men. The French were swept off the ridge and Foy wounded. After seeing this rout, Heudelet's other brigade withdrew to the base of the ridge.

=== VI Corps attack ===
Hearing gunfire, Ney assumed Reynier's men were enjoying success and ordered an attack. In this sector, the main highway climbed a long spur past the hamlets of Moura and Sula to reach the crest at the Convent of Bussaco. Against a very heavy British skirmish line, Loison's division fought its way forward. Near the crest, 1,800 men of the 43rd and 52nd infantry regiments lay down waiting. As Loison's leading brigade approached the convent grounds, the two British units stood up, fired a terrific volley at point blank range and charged with the bayonet. The French brigade collapsed and fled, leaving BG Édouard Simon, their commander, wounded and a prisoner.

A short time later and slightly further south, Loison's second brigade under Brigadier General Claude François Ferey ran into a close-range fire from two batteries plus Anglo-Portuguese musketry. This unit was also routed. A final thrust by Brigadier General Antoine Louis Popon de Maucune's brigade of Marchand's division met defeat when it ran into Denis Pack's Portuguese brigade. The two sides occupied the rest of the day in vigorous skirmishing, but the French did not try to attack in force again.

== Aftermath ==
The French suffered 522 dead, 3,612 wounded, and 364 captured. The allied losses numbered 200 dead, 1,001 wounded, and 51 missing. The British and Portuguese each lost exactly 626 men.

Masséna now realised the size of Wellington's forces and the strength of his defensive position, so that afternoon he had sent cavalry patrols to reconnoitre both ends of the Bussaco ridge, looking for a way round the position. The French army withdrew towards Mortagoa, with fires lit in the woods to offer some camouflage to the troops' departure. Massena issued orders on the evening of 28 September which sent his army along the Sardaõ road via Boialvo, outflanking Wellington's position to the north of the Bussaco ridge, and opening up the main road from Oporto to Coimbra.

Wellington, after spending the night in the convent, and finding his position turned, resumed the leisurely retreat of his army towards the, still being constructed, Lines of Torres Vedras. He reached these in good order by 10 October.

Continuing to advance, Masséna left his sick and wounded troops at Coimbra, where a few days later, they fell into the hands of the Portuguese.

This was the first major battle of the Peninsular War in which units of the reconstituted Portuguese Army fought, where the Portuguese troops played a prominent part and the victory served as a great morale boost to the inexperienced troops.

The Third Portuguese campaign proceeded with the probing of the Lines of Torres Vedras in the Battle of Sobral on 14 October. Masséna found them too strong to attack and withdrew into winter quarters. Deprived of food for his men and harried by Anglo-Portuguese hit-and-run tactics, he lost a further 25,000 men captured or dead from starvation or sickness before he retreated into Spain early in 1811. This finally freed Portugal from French occupation except for the fortress of Almeida, near the frontier. During the retreat, several actions were fought, including the Battle of Sabugal.

== In fiction ==
- Under Wellington's Command by G.A. Henty includes a section on the Battle of Bussaco (sp. 'Busaco' in the text).
- Sharpe's Escape by Bernard Cornwell covers the battle.
- Stranger from the Sea by Winston Graham features a visit to the front line by Ross Poldark, who is on a government fact-finding mission.

Preceded by Siege of Almeida (1810)	Napoleonic Wars; Battle of Bussaco	Succeeded by Battle of the Gebora
