= Castle Fortress of Almeida =

Castle in Guarda District, Portugal

Castle/Fortress of Almeida
- Castelo e Fortaleza de Almeida
- Guarda, Beira Interior Norte, Norte in Portugal
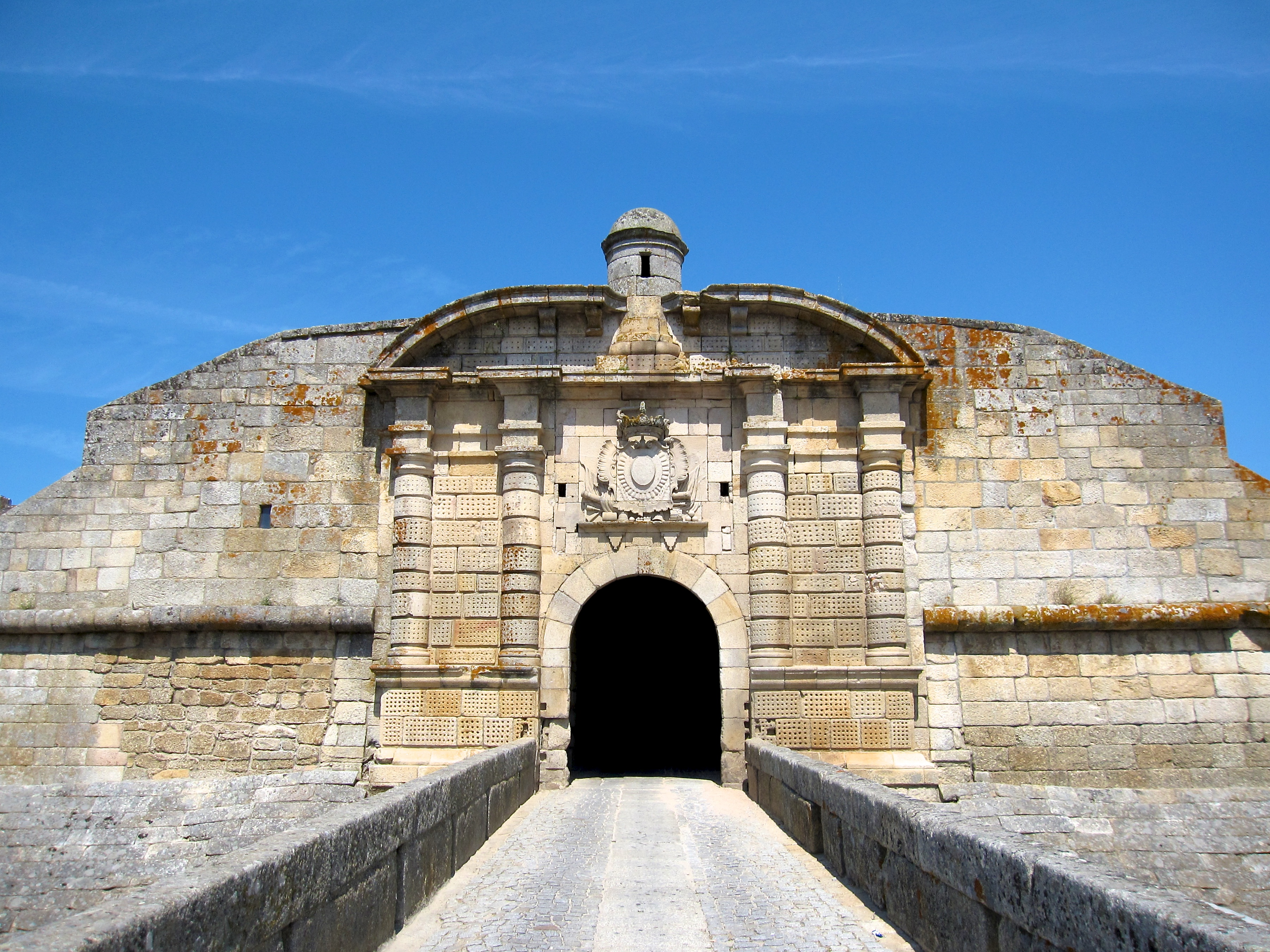
- The double gates of São Francisco along the walls of the star fort

Site information
- Type: Castle
- Owner: Portuguese Republic
- Operator: DRCCentro (Dispatch 829/2009; Diário da República, Série II, 163, 24 August 2009)
- Open to the public: Public

Location
- Coordinates: 40°43′32.4″N 6°54′21.5″W

Site history
- Built: 1641
- Materials: Masonry, Granite, Cement, Wood, Azulejo, Stone

The Castle/Fortress of Almeida (Portuguese: Castelo e Fortaleza de Almeida) is a fortress/castle situated in the civil parish of Almeida, in the municipality of Almeida in the Portuguese district of Guarda, in the former-northwestern province of Beira Alta. It was constructed in this region due to its significant strategic importance, due to its close proximity to the border between Portugal and Spain. It is classified as a National Monument. The 1810 explosion: the magazine which was the seat of the explosion was in the cathedral adjacent to the castle, not the castle itself as reported in the text.

== History ==
Portuguese settlements in the north were conveniently constructed on hilltops, providing protection to local populations from raids. During the Roman Iberian invasion/occupation many of these settlements were converted into fortified villages, due to their strategic positions. The first defensive structures were believed to be constructed by these colonists, who worked in the older castros into their fortifications.

Roman occupation of the territory was followed by successive waves of Suevi and the Visigoths who repurposed the structures. Muslim settlers, later known as Moors, occupied the settlements during the Taifa of Badajoz. The lands of Almeida were conquered from these Moors in 1039, by Ferdinand I of León and Castile, but remained contentious between 1156 and 1190, when they alternated between León, Moors and Portucalense forces. In 1190, the territory was reconquered from the Moors by Pio Guterres, named the Almeidão, effectively ending Moorish dominance in the region and inspiring the name for the village. From here the lands alternated between Leonese and Portuguese, and by 1217 Almeida was recorded as a Leonese village, part of a group of settlements that protected the Côa valley.

=== Medieval ===
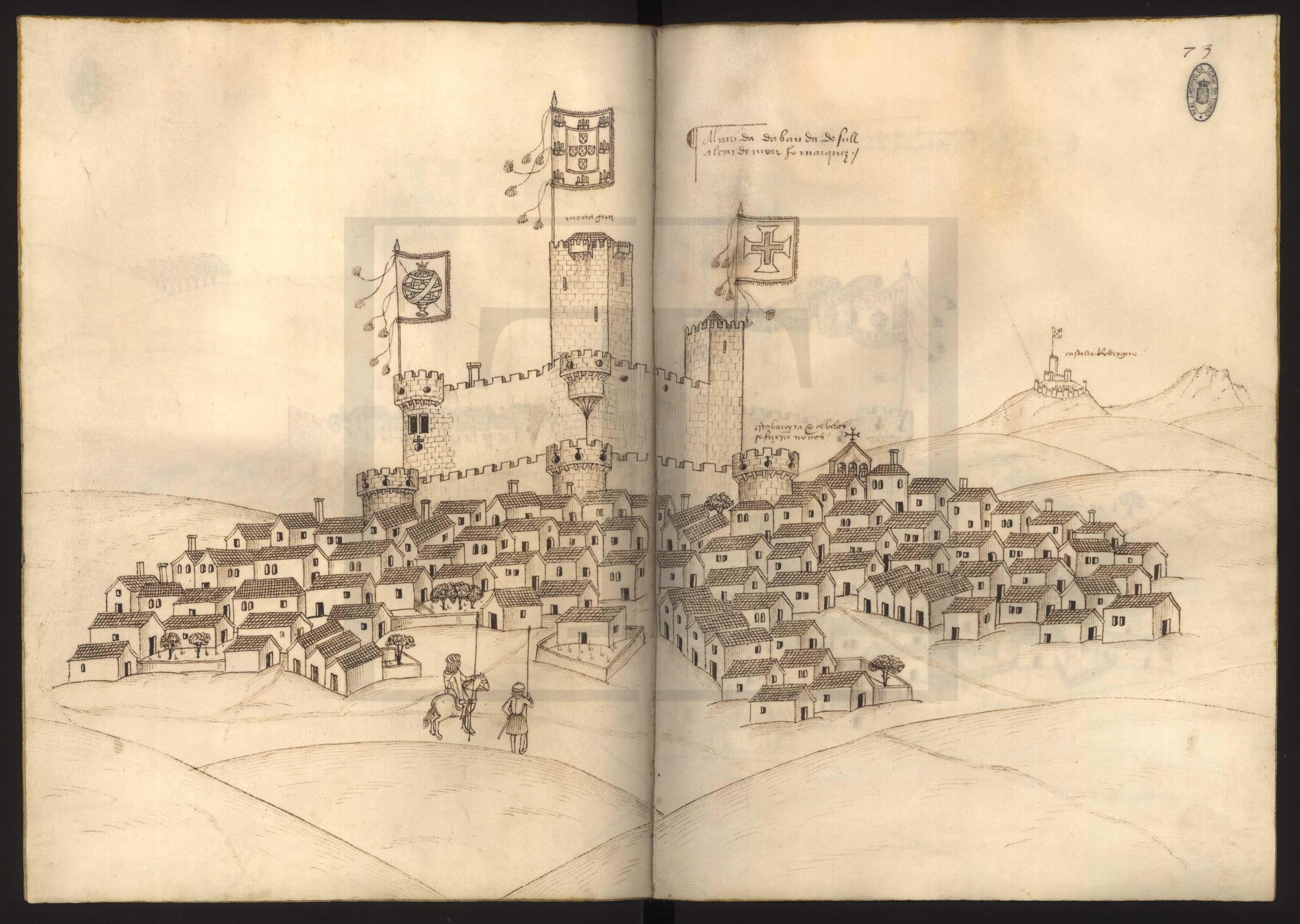
Castle of Almeida in the Book of Fortresses, compiled by Duarte D'Armas in 1510

By 1217, documents show that the castle at Almeida is one of several strong points that guard the border between Spain and Portugal. On 8 November 1296, King D. Dinis issued a foral (charter) to Almeida, ordering the re-construction of a castle and walls. This structure was expanded in 1369 by order of D. Ferdinand.

In 1372, Isabella the illegitimate daughter of Ferdinand I, married Alfonso, Count of Gijón and Noroña, who was the illegitimate son of King Henrique II of Castile. This marriage was one of the clauses of the peace treaty signed between Portugal and Castile in 1373, along with the castle and lands of Almeida been ceded to Castile for three years.

In 1383, during the Succession Crisis, the castle's alcalde swore fealty to D. Beatriz, and aligned himself with Castile, resulting in the 1386 conquest of Almeida by King D. John I, through the assistance of Portuguese nobles in Castile, securing the Portuguese throne. The village began to pertain to the Crown of Portugal in 1407, with the exchange of lands arranged between King John and the alcalde. King D. Afonso V donated Almeida to D. Pedro de Menezes.

During the reign of King Manuel I the strengthening and enlargement of the castle's walls and fortifications were ordered. The works were carried out under the instruction of the architect Mateus Fernandes and were completed in 1508. In a letter dated 9 September 1508, King Manuel gave instructions to stonemason Álvaro Pires to examine the works, to which he assigned Francsico de Anzinho master of works, to undertake the task for 1$550. On 27 October, D. Manuel ordered payment of mason Martim Lourenço for his work in Almeida, to "look at the work that was completed by Francisco de Anzinho". Almeida Castle was included in a set of manuscripts formed into a book which contained drawings of all 56 castles located on the border between Portugal and Spain. The book, called the Book of Fortresses, had been ordered compiled by King Manuel I, was completed between 1509 and 1510. The author was Duarte D'Armas, a squire of the Royal Household and a bachelor of canon law and apostolic notary, who held the office of Registrar of the Royal Library and Torre do Tombo. He personally visited each castle and fortress for the purpose. There are two drawings of the castle at Almeida Castle in the book; a northern elevation and a southern elevation with both castle drawings bearing the personal standard of King Manuel I, who issued a new foral in 1510.

=== Restoration Wars ===
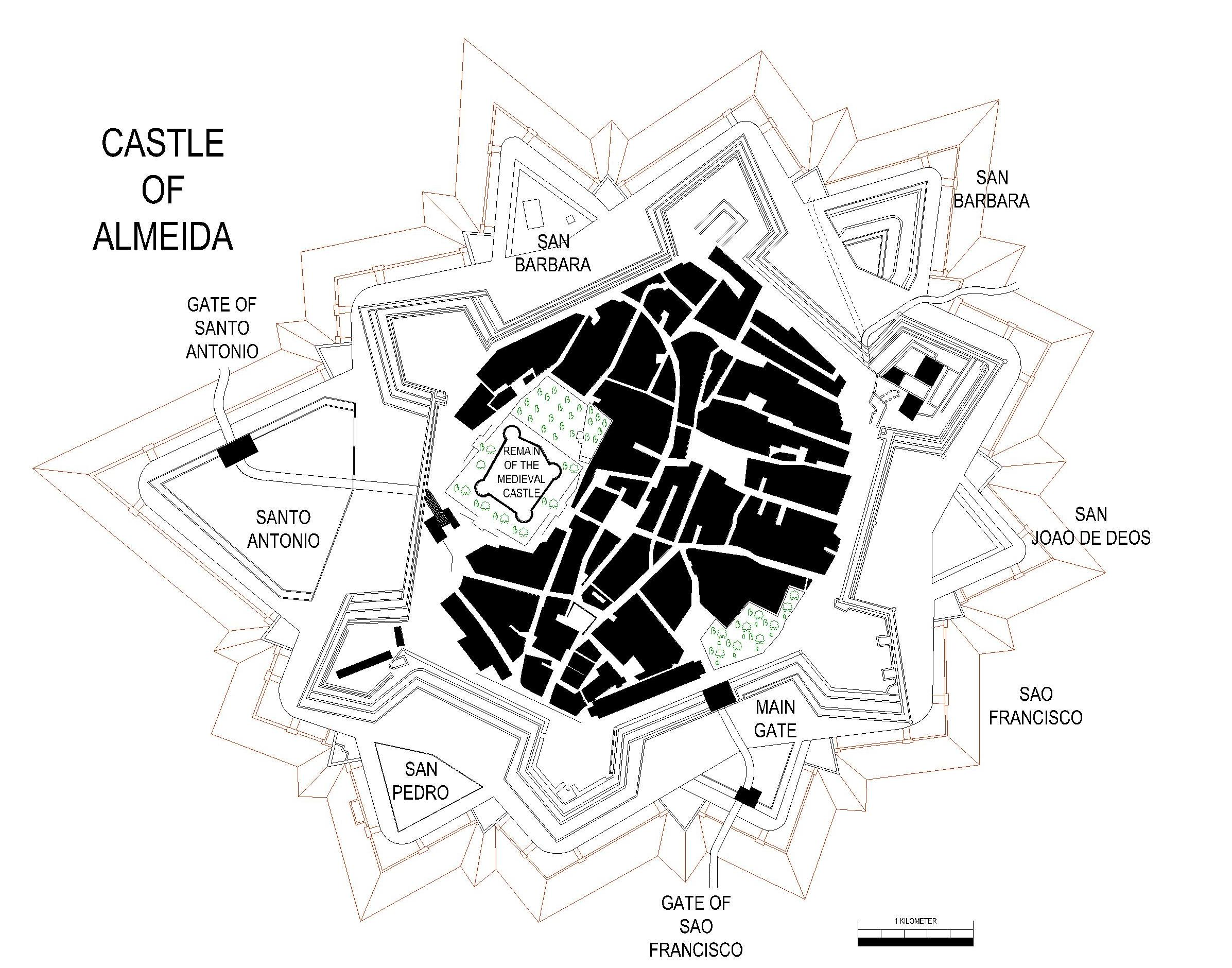
A plan of the castle/fortress of Almeida

From 1517, buildings in the town were demolished for the fortress project. In addition, a tax of $100 was levied on each person for the project, which included walls and garrison.

But, between 1580 and 1640, the defensive structures began to decay and fall into ruin. Following John IV of Portugal's restoration of the Crown of Portugal, on 1 December 1640, the monarch sought to consolidate and strengthen his throne, making decisions to strengthen his military control of the territory. He created a Council of War to organize the Kingdom's security along with a Junta of the Frontiers. This Junta had the responsibility of reviewing and strengthening the existing fortresses near the border. One of the Junta's projects was the construction of a new defensive structure at Almeida.

Following 1640, the first Military Governor for Beira was established, D. Álvaro de Abranches da Câmara, who ordered the construction of modern fortifications, "with four or five redoubts, placing within it a Church and the Castle". This project was undertaken by João Saldanha e Sousa, and was in rudimentary progress by January 1641. This first fortification consisted of trenches. By November the Provincial Governor was established in Almeida, who transformed the installation into a military square.

This became the fortress that stands on the site today, surrounding the previous medieval castle. Completed in 1641, it was 12 pointed-star shaped. Responsibility for the project was by the architect David Álvares. The fortress was built in a Vaubanesque style, to which the French military engineer is believed to have personally been involved during end of its construction.

Between 1641 and 1643, architect Álvares was the superintendent on site, "administrating the representatives, masons and more workers and assisting personally in the work at the fortifications". As he did not receive a wage for his work, he requested and received an exemption to the tithe. In 1642, Fernão Teles de Menezes decided to build a trench of stone and clay. King D. John IV ordered his royal engineer, Carlos Lassart, to design and reconnoitre the fortifications in the Entre Douro, Minho and Beira regions. Fernão Teles Cotão became responsible for the project between 1642 and 1646. On 28 February 1643, a royal dispatch ordered Carlos Lassart to, as each fortification was being expanded, leave an official oriented to continue the project. Sometime around this time, French engineer Pierre Gilles de Saint Paul began serving the Crown within the Beira province, possibly directing some of the work in Almeida. By 1644, the fortress was described as having an open curtain of walls. As João Salgado de Araújo, indicated the execution of the Royal fortifications included an imposing structure of seven redoubts.

On 25 February 1645, the Military Governor for Beira was D. Fernando de Mascaranhas, Count of Serém, who immediately ordered that the square be reduced in size. In that year, Spanish forces attempted to attack the town, without success.

In 1646, Pierre Girles was substituted in the public works by lieutenant-general Rodrigo Soares Pantoja, and the Governor of the Province immediately ordered the dimensions of the square be reduced. Yet, the following year, work on the fortress was expanded by sergeant-major Agostinho de Andrade Freire. Similarly, in 1657, D. Rodrigo de Castro, Governor of Almeida, increased work on the fortification, ordering large changes its profile and organization. Sometime during the 17th century, the castle began being used to store gunpowder. In 1661, from the writings of the Count of Mesquitela, the square was not yet totally encircled, and was accessible from the town at various places and had no moat.

On 2 July 1663, Spanish forces attacked the fort, but were repelled, but there were constant fears of Spanish invasion. On 11 September 1663 the province of Beira was divided into two regions, due to its large frontier. The region of Almeida came under the control of Pedro Jacques e Magalhães, Master of the General Camp of the province, who established his post in the town. In order to safeguard his new post, in 1665, the public works on the fortress were adjudicated to businessmen António Francisco Maio and Domingos Vaz Heredes, but were later (16679 conceded to João Gonçalves and Manuel Fernandes, without discord. On 13 February 1668, Portugal and Spain signed a peace treaty, temporarily ending conflict between the two Iberian neighbours.

The lull in hostilities did not dissuade Portuguese forces who vigorously continued work on the fortress, beginning with the left lateral walls near the Santo António Gate. In 1676, the magistral gate of Santo António and transition space to the ravelin of Cruz were begun. The Chapel of Vera Cruz was demolished in 1680, in order for the fortifications walls to be extended. Meanwhile, in 1695, there was an explosion in the castle, causing the death of 40 people and a large damage to the residences and fortifications nearby. This damage caused a change in the configuration of the castle.

Between 1702 and 1714, during the War of Spanish Succession, Almeida began to serve as a garrison for troops, and base of operations for forces in Beira. In May 1704, Portugal was invaded by Spanish troops. Conflict between the two states would continue until February 1715, when a peace treaty was signed.

In 1736, an explosion occurred in the warehouse of the bastion of São Pedro, at the same time that double ravelin was added to the fortress. Between 1737 and 1738, work at the site was directed by the Royal engineer Manuel de Azevedo Fortes, assisted by engineers Pinto de Alpoim and Jacinto Lopes da Costa. Manuel de Azevedo Fortes proposed the construction of: mounted horseman over the bastion of São João de Deus; a kitchen in front of the ravelin dos Amores; "tenalham" in front of the walls between the bastions of São Pedro and Santo António; vaults for defense of the moats, in front of all the walls, except in the rear and gates; a powder magazine alongside the castle; two bomb-proof barracks under the bulwarks of São Francisco and Santa Bárbara; the division of the ravelin de Santo António into two separate corpos per moat and with gate to the east; and openings for posterns in the bastions of São Pedro, São Francisco and walls between the bastions of São João de Deus and Santa Bárbara. A majority of the proposed projects were not executed, and only the gates of São Francisco and some ravelins were begun. Between 1746 and 1747, lands was expropriated for execution of the fortress. On 1 November 1755, the famous Lisbon earthquake caused damage to the walls and destruction of the infantry barracks.

by March 1762, the fortress had largely attained its current dimensions and profile, even as the ravelins were not concluded, nor the esplanade and battlements. At this time the works were under the direction of João Alexandre de Charmont, along with engineers João Victoire Aliron de Sabione, Luís de Alincourt, Vasco José Charpententier, Pedro Vicente Vidal and António Carlos Andreis. Work had begun on the kitchen in front of the ravelin of Santa Bárbara; correction of the parapets were undertaken, owing to their sub-dimension, eliminating the road the circled it; construction of lateral paths in the walls between the bastions of São João de Deus and Santa Bárbara, and the bulwarks of São Pedro and Santo António; substitution of stone in the battlements and partial reconstruction of the covering. Charmont left with his success, António Carlos Andreis, a long list of works to be executed. A few of the request projects were considered inconvenient to the military engineers, and were changed.

=== Seven Years' War ===
As part of the circumstances of the Seven Years' War, on 18 May 1762, Portugal declared war on France and Spain. By June, work on covering the casemates in the bastion of São João de Deus were progressing, although Francisco Maclean has suggested making them bomb-proof. On 15 June, Spain declared war on Portugal and concentrated a large number of Spanish and French along the frontiers of Beira. Meanwhile, work on the fortress continued, with the construction of platforms in wood and the opening of cannon emplacements in the bastions. The excessive number of cannons emplacements executed put in cause the defenses' resistance, and many had to be closed.

Then, the fortress was besieged by Spanish forces for nine days between 16 and the 25 August 1762. Known later as the Siege of Almeida, Spanish forces under the command of Count of Aranda lead a major offensive to take control of Portugal. The northern pincer of this force crossed the border into Portugal from Galicia, while the southern arm crossed the frontier from Ciudad Rodrigo and was soon outside Almeida. On the 25 August, Portuguese forces capitulated to the Spanish and advanced west towards Porto. This advance towards Porto was stalled due to the influx of 8,000 British troops and the Battle of Valencia de Alcántara, events which interfered with Spanish resources and supply lines. The Almeida fortress was garrisoned by the Spanish and held, despite the set-backs. Almeida remained the only major fortress still held by Spain by the end of the war. On 3 November 1762, the peace treaty of Fontainebleau was signed, leading to the 10 February 1763 Treaty of Paris, ending the Seven Years' War. As part of the treaty, on 11 April 1763 Almeida was devolved to Portugal, when Field Marshall Francisco Maclean accepted Spanish surrender, in exchange for the return of Cuba and the Philippines to Spain, which had previously been in the hands of the British.

On 9 May 1764, the Count of Lippe reexamined the batteries, and Miguel Luís Jacob surveyed the state of the military square, along with their adjuncts, Francisco João Roscio and Francisco Gomes de Lima. On 30 January 1766, Maclean obtained regal authorization to proceed with work at the site, that included latrines for soldiers. A "General Plan for Additional Necessary Works for the Defense of the City of Almeida" was elaborated by Colonel Almeida Jacques Funck. Miguel Luís Jacob became director for the public works. While insisting that most of the work was necessary, little was executed. But, in 1766, a gunpowder magazine was constructed at the bastion of São Pedro, substituting the one that existed on the embankment, along with a similar one at the ravelin of Santa Bárbara. In 1773, the Field Marshall was substituted for Fernando da Costa Ataíde Theive. On 9 March 1770, "Extracto de apontamentos sobre o estado atual desta fortificação, dos Reparos e Obras novas de q. Necessita..." (Extract of notes on the actual state of these fortifications, its Artillery and new public works that are Needed...) by engineer Anastácio António de Sousa Miranda, which proposed several projects until 1810. The work would be under the direction of Matias José Dias Azedo, assisted by Joaquim Pedro Pinto de Sousa and José Feliciano de Gouveia. On 21 November 1796, they solicited the construction of a battery where the enemy had constructed a temporary installation.

=== Peninsular Wars ===
In 1800, First Consul Napoleon Bonaparte and his ally, the Spanish prime-minister Manuel de Godoy, sent an ultimatum to Portugal demanding that they should close their shipping to their old ally England (in the Anglo-Portuguese Treaty of 1373), and to enter into an alliance with France. The Portuguese refused and on 28 February 1801, France declared war on Portugal, followed on 2 March by Spanish declarations to support its alliance with France: instituting the War of the Oranges. The defense of Beira was left to the Marquess of Alorna, and the fortress was under the command of Field Marshall Gustavo Adolfo Hércules de Chermont, who accelerated the execution of complimentary plan presented in 1795 and 1796, and expressed the urgency of erecting an embankment over the bastion of São João de Deus. Spain invaded from the Alentejo and over the following months entered into a stalemate with Portuguese forces at Elvas, Campo Maior, Olivença and Juromenha. On 6 June 1801 Portugal entered into a formal peace treaty with Spain on the tenets of the Treaty of Badajoz, which was formalized with France on 29 September. But, after the Battle of Trafalgar in 1805, Portugal restored relations with its old ally.

In December 1806, Napoleon decreed the Continental Blockade, imposing on Europe the forced closing of ports to English ships, which Portugal did not accept. Napoleon, therefore, ordered the invasion of Portugal. On 20 November 1807, the first invasion, commanded by Jean-Andoche Junot, began, resulting in the 13 January 1808 taking of the fortress, without resistance. The French left in August, and the Portuguese named Colonel Francisco Bernardo da Costa as the Governor of Almeida.

Following Napoleon's brutal repression of the Spanish Dos de Mayo Uprising in Madrid, the Emperor triggered the Peninsular War by ordering a force of 4,000 troops with sixteen cannon across the border to occupy the fortress of Almeida, which despite the earlier French invasion of the country, was still in the hands of the Portuguese. From the fortress, Napoleon ordered that his general Junot should closely observe the cities of Valladolid, Salamanca and Ciudad Rodrigo. On the 24 May 1808 the first body of troops under the command of General Louis-Henri Loison marched on to Almeida, arriving and occupying the fortress on 5 June.

In February 1809, the second French invasion began under the command of Marshal Soult, but never reached Almeida.

Then on 15 August 1810, André Masséna began the third intervention, bombarding the fortress, now under the command of British Brigadier General William Cox. On 26 August, a shell made a chance hit on the medieval castle within the fortress, which was being used as the powder magazine. It ignited 4,000 prepared charges, which in turn ignited 68,000 kilograms (150,000 lb) of black powder and 1,000,000 musket cartridges. The ensuing explosion killed 600 defenders and wounded 300. The medieval castle was razed to the ground and sections of the defenses were damaged. Unable to reply to the French cannonade without gunpowder, Cox was forced to capitulate the following day with the survivors of the blast and 100 cannon. The French losses during the operation were 58 killed and 320 wounded. Masséna left the fortress in the hands of General Brenier. On 7 April 1811, Wellington planned the retaking of Almeida. On 7 May, Masséna ordered the destruction of the fortress, so that Anglo-Portuguese forces could not use it in the future. With that, on 10 May, as French abandoned the installation through the bastion of São João de Deus, they caused the destruction of the artillery within the fortress. Almeida, therefore, was retaken by troops of the Alliance and held provisionally. On 7 June 1813, Colonel Pedro Folque worked on a project for the revitalizing the fortress. Within the year, the war with France was over. William Carr Beresford proposed to the Minister of War that the fortress should be dismantled and that the artillery should be removed. On 3 March 1817, Beresford ordered that work on the fort should cease and that the fortification should be mined, which began in October, against the wishes of the Governor of Almeida. In 1819, the Governor ordered the square be buried, and that the castle be transformed into a parkway or promenade. These changes made the fortress a campaign fort, providing monumental defensive functions, in times of crisis.

=== Liberal Wars ===
In 1828, the municipal authority sided with King D. Miguel, but the military garrison at fortress remains loyal to King D. Pedro. By June, Miguelist/absolutist forces had the fortress encircled, leading to their surrender by 16 July. Miguelist troops then remained at Almeida until 18 April 1834, when they were evacuated. On 22 April, a Quadruple Alliance was signed between Liberal forces of England, France, Spain and Portugal, that required their intervention in the defence of Liberal parliamentary institutions. These events, ultimately, lead to the 26 May signing of the peace treaty at Evoramonte, forcing D. Miguel into exile, and beginning a period of free Liberal thinking in Portugal. Quickly, though, factionalism between Devourists, Chartists and Setembrists developed into a series of episodes that enriched internal politics, leading to internal strife and civil war. On 29 June 1847, the Convention of Gramido put an end to the civil war, not before the fortress was taken by revolutionary forces in 1844 interested in reinstating the 1822 Constitution.

In 1853, Marshall Duke of Saldanha, commander of the Portuguese army, named a commission to examine the fortifications at Almeida and decide its military future. The commission took another year to visit the square, which they saw as one of the strongest of the Kingdom, and suggestion it should be repaired. Many of the required alterations and repairs were documented. On 27 August 1887, the fortress of Almeida returns to its classification as a first-class fortification, and on 7 January 1888, a new military Governor is appointed. This "golden era" would be short-lived: in September 1893, after public review, the fortress was partially destroyed, during the course of improving the accessibility and converting it from a defense fortification. In 1894 the majority of artillery pieces were removed, leading to the 28 June 1895 declassification of the square by the Comissão Superior de Guerra (Superior Commission for War).

=== 20th century ===
At the beginning of the 20th century, connections were made between the ravelin and magistral gate of Cruz.

In October 1926, a cavalry contingent with its headquarters in Aveiro departed for Almeida. The Ministry of War obliged the squadron to return to their barracks, on 26 January 1927, but they only departed on 19 February 1927.

Starting in 1980, the fortress began to take on a socio-cultural and historical function, with the installation of multiple exhibitions and centres for investigation. In that year, a military museum was inaugurated in the Gate of Cruz. A tourism post was inaugurated in the magistral gate in 1992. As well, the fortress was placed in charge of the Instituto Português do Património Arquitetónico (Portuguese Institute of Architectural Patrimony) by decree 106F/92 (Diário da República, Série 1A), in the same year, resulting in a permanent exhibition dedicated to the 23rd Infantry Regiment, along with activity space for scouts and multi-use halls in the guardhouse of the Santo António Gate was installed in 1996. Ultimately, on 25 August 2002, the Centro de Estudos de Arquitectura Militar (Centre for Studies into Military Architecture) was implanted in the ravelin of Santo António. On 20 December 2007, the property became the responsibility of the Direção Regional da Cultura do Centro (Centro Region Directorate for Culture), under auspices of the dispatch 1130/2007 (Diário da República, Série 2, 245).

== Architecture ==
The castle is situated in an isolated urban context, implanted on the western limits 7 kilometres (4.3 mi) from the Castela-Leão plateau, 763 metres (2,503 ft) over the valley of the River Côa. The modern fortification encompasses the older part of the village, covered in vegetation and only open along the military square, while the small bastion of Cruz is punctuated with trees. Alongside the Cruz gate, is the infantry barracks of Terreiro das Freiras and, immediately nearby, the Church and Hospital of the Misericórdia of Almeida. Near the bastion of São João de Deus is the Pousada de Nossa Senhora das Neves and on the embankment of the bastion, the old Trem de Artilharia or Picadeiro Real. On the extreme west of the village centre, at an elevated height, are the foundations of the castle, where a platform has been erected for tourists to view the site. Between the bastion of São João de Deus is a posterm or false gate, that accesses greenspace flanked by military square.

The fortress seen today is arranged on an irregular hexagonal plan and consists of six polygon, irregular and uneven sized bastions which are connected by curtain walls and forming a perimeter of 1.5 miles (2.4 km) and forms a 12 pointed star shaped fortress with six triangular shaped ravelins . The fortress perimeter is completed with a moat and road with a covered terrace. The three ravelins on the north elevation are constructed on a flat masonry parapet wall topped with escarpment walls in stone. At each angled corner of the northern ravelins there is a cylindrical watchtower with a dome roofs. These ravelins are topped with ramped platforms for cannons and launching mortars placements. The three ravelins on the southern elevation have flat masonry parapet walls which are crowned with ramparts of earthworks and like the northern ravelins are topped with ramped platforms for cannons and launching mortars placements. These six bastions are called São Francisco, São João de Deus, Santa Bárbara, de Nossa Senhora das Brotas ou do Trem and Santo António e São Pedro. The São João de Deus ravelin has integrated large bunkers built into its interior.

=== Gateway ===
To access the fortress the main gate is located at the south east curtain wall between Santo António e São Pedro and São Francisco and features a set of two long tunnel gateways separated by a bridge over the dry moat. the outer arched tunnel is called Porta da muralha the inside tunnel gateway is called Porta São Francisco. The facade of this gate features an arched entrance with double Doric columns either side. The columns are topped by a semi-circular shaped pediment. below the pediment and above the entrance there is a heraldic blazon or crest of arms.
