= Siege of Ciudad Rodrigo (1810) =

1810 siege during the Peninsular War

- Part of Peninsular War
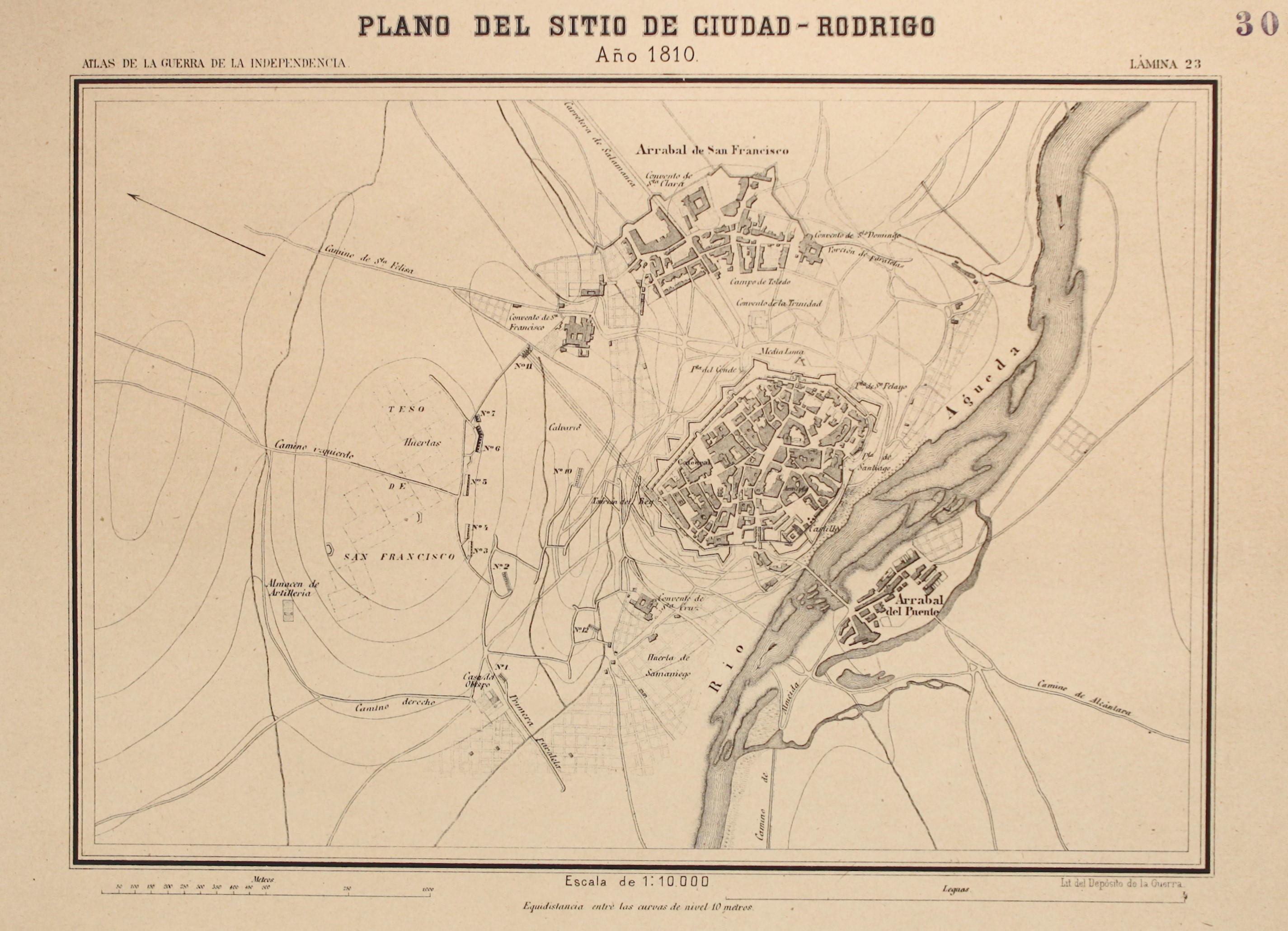
- Spanish map of the battle (1868)
Date	26 April – 10 July 1810
Location	Ciudad Rodrigo, Castile and León, Spain 40.6000°N 6.5333°W
Result	French victory

Belligerents
(France) French Empire	Kingdom of Spain

Commanders and leaders
(France) André Masséna (France) Michel Ney	(Spain) Andrés Pérez de Herrasti

Strength
28,000	5,500

Casualties and losses
1,500	5,500

Peninsular War: Third French invasion
current battle

In the siege of Ciudad Rodrigo, in Salamanca, Spain, the French Marshal Michel Ney took the fortified city from Field Marshal Andrés Pérez de Herrasti on 10 July 1810 after a siege that began on 26 April. Ney's VI Corps made up part of a 65,000-strong army commanded by André Masséna, who was bent on a third French invasion of Portugal.

== Background ==
The Third Portuguese campaign started with the construction of the Lines of Torres Vedras and the Siege of Ciudad Rodrigo.

== Forces ==
Ney's VI Corps included Jean Marchand's 1st Division (6,500), Julien Mermet's 2nd Division (7,400), Louis Loison's 3rd Division (6,600), Auguste Lamotte's corps light cavalry brigade (900), Charles Gardanne's mounted dragoon brigade (1,300) and 60 cannon.

Herrasti commanded three regular battalions from the Avila, Segovia and 1st Majorca Infantry Regiments, 375 artillerymen and 60 sappers. These troops were supplemented by three battalions of the Volunteers of Ciudad Rodrigo and one battalion of the Urban Guard.

== Siege ==
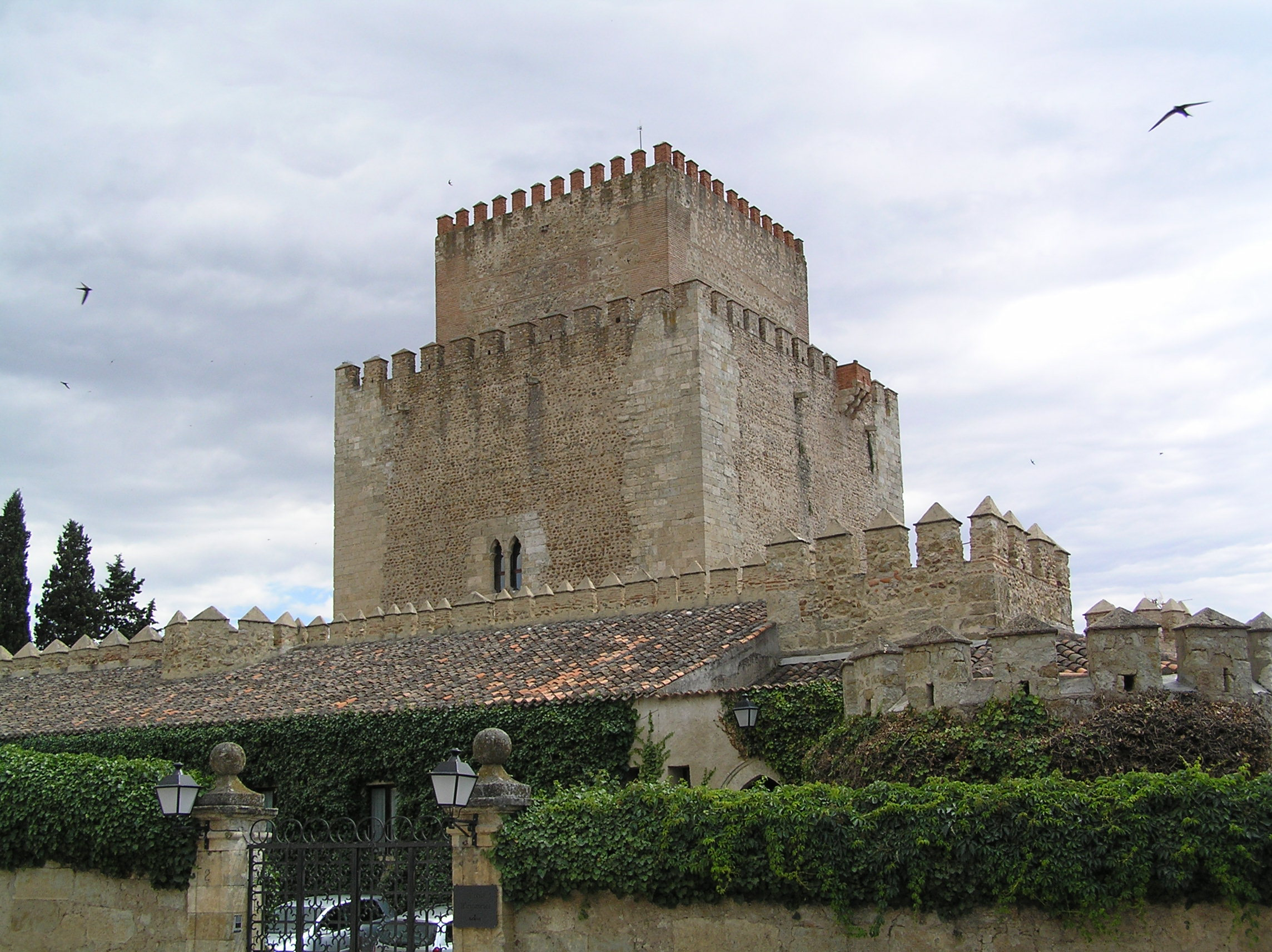
Torre del Homenaje del Castillo de Enrique II from the Plaza del Castillo, with a 1507 barrier in the foreground

Initially hoping to be relieved by the British Light under Brigadier General Robert Craufurd, which was nearby, in accordance with the aid that had been promised, Herrasti refused the initial offer to surrender. Viscount Wellington was not however prepared to meet the French in open battle, as he was greatly outnumbered, resting on the Portuguese frontier to await the outcome of the siege.

Herrasti's 5,500-man Spanish garrison put up a gallant and sustained defence, for over ten weeks, surrendering only after the counterscarp had been blown in, Ney's artillery opened practical breaches in the walls and the French infantry were poised for an assault. Herrasti met Ney at the foot of the breach and having been offered the chance of an honourable capitulation, accepted. "Ney promised that the people and property of the inhabitants of the city would be respected. However, all the men who had participated in the defence, and the members of the Central Junta who had encouraged it, would be taken as prisoners to France."

The Spanish suffered 461 killed and 994 wounded, while 4,000 men and 118 cannon were captured. Ney's VI Corps lost 180 killed and over 1,000 wounded during the siege. The French troops then pillaged the city, breaking Ney's promise. The siege delayed Masséna's invasion of Portugal by over a month.

== Aftermath ==
The Third Portuguese campaign proceeded with the advance of the French troops, following up the retreating British resulting in the Battle of the Côa. The siege of Almeida was started and ended suddenly with a massive explosion of the fortress magazine on 26 August. With all obstacles cleared from their path, the French could march on Lisbon in strength.

A defensive battle, the Battle of Bussaco, was fought, which gave the French a bloody nose, before the British and Portuguese fell back on the Lines of Torres Vedras which were completed as the troops arrived. The lines were designed to enable a successful defence of Lisbon and avoid a British evacuation of the peninsular, as had happened after the Battle of Corunna in January 1809.

The delay in capturing Ciudad Rodrigo gave many precious weeks of time to enable the Lines of Torres Vedras to be completed and therefore contributed greatly to the Allied victory of the Peninsular War.

A second siege of Ciudad Rodrigo occurred in January 1812, with the French being besieged this time, losing the town after a short two-week siege.

== Notes ==
Preceded by Siege of Astorga	Napoleonic Wars; Siege of Ciudad Rodrigo (1810)	Succeeded by Combat of Barquilla (1810)
