= John Ross (British Army officer, died 1843) =

British Army officer

Lieutenant-General John Ross CB
- Died: 17 May 1843
- Burial place: Southampton
- Military career
- Allegiance: United Kingdom
- Branch: British Army
- Service years: 1793–1843
- Rank: Lieutenant-General
- Commands: 52nd Regiment of Foot
- Conflicts: French Revolutionary Wars; Ferrol Expedition; Napoleonic Wars; Walcheren Expedition; Peninsular War; Battle of Vimeiro; Battle of Corunna; Battle of Pombal; Battle of Redinha; Battle of Casal Novo; Battle of Sabugal; Battle of Fuentes de Oñoro
- Awards: Army Gold Medal

Lieutenant-General John Ross CB (died 17 May 1843) was a British Army officer who became Lieutenant Governor of Guernsey.

== Military career ==
Ross got his first commission on 2 June 1793, as an ensign in the 36th (Herefordshire) Regiment of Foot. He was commissioned a lieutenant in the 52nd (Oxfordshire) Regiment of Foot on 8 May 1796, and captain in the same regiment on 11 January 1800. Ross took part, with his regiment, in the Ferrol Expedition later that year. He became a major in the regiment on 15 August 1804.

On 28 January 1808, Ross purchased a lieutenant-colonelcy in the 91st Regiment of Foot, but exchanged back into the 52nd on 18 February 1808. He went to the Peninsular War with the 2/52nd, which he commanded at Vimiero, where he was mentioned in despatches. He continued to command the 2nd Battalion through Sir John Moore's campaign that winter, and five companies of the regiment in the Walcheren Campaign. Ross subsequently returned to the Peninsula to command the 1/52nd, with whom he fought at Pombal, Redinha, Casal Novo, Foz d'Arunce, Sabugal, and Fuentes de Oñoro, during Masséna's retreat from Portugal in the spring of 1811.

On 20 August 1811, Ross was appointed deputy adjutant-general to the Forces in Ceylon. He served there until June 1814, when he returned to Europe for reasons of health. He was promoted colonel in the 66th (Berkshire) Regiment of Foot on 4 June 1814. He was made a Companion of the Bath in June 1815. After serving as Deputy Adjutant-General in Ireland from 1815 to 1818, Ross was made Commandant of the Depot on the Isle of Wight in 1819, and went on half-pay in 1820. On 27 May 1825, he was promoted major-general. Ross was appointed Lieutenant Governor of Guernsey in 1828 and retired from that post in 1837. The next year, on 28 June 1838, he was promoted lieutenant general. He became Colonel of the 46th Regiment of Foot on 1 August 1839 and died on 17 May 1843 in Southampton.

He is not to be confused with Major-General Sir John Ross, KCB, of the 95th Regiment and Cape Corps, who died in 1835.

Government offices
Preceded by Sir John Colborne	Lieutenant Governor of Guernsey; 1828–1837	Succeeded by Sir James Douglas
Military offices
Preceded by Sir Charles Greville	Colonel of the 98th (Prince of Wales's) Regiment of Foot; 1836–1839	Succeeded by Sir Willoughby Cotton
Preceded by Sir John Keane	Colonel of the 46th (the South Devonshire) Regiment of Foot; 1839–1843	Succeeded by The Earl of Stair
