= Leonard Greenwell =

British Major-general

Sir Leonard Greenwell KCB KCH
- Born: 1781
- Died: 11 November 1844 (aged 63); Harley Street, London
- Military career
- Allegiance: United Kingdom
- Branch: British Army
- Service years: 1801–1844
- Rank: Major-general
- Commands: 45th Regiment of Foot; Commandant of Chatham
- Conflicts: Napoleonic Wars; British invasions of the River Plate; Battle of Buenos Aires (WIA); Peninsular War; Battle of Rolica; Battle of Vimeiro; Battle of Talavera; Battle of Bussaco; Battle of Pombal; Battle of Redinha; Battle of Casal Novo; Battle of Foz de Arouce; Battle of Sabugal; Battle of Fuentes de Oñoro; Second Siege of Badajoz; Siege of Ciudad Rodrigo; Third Siege of Badajoz; Battle of Salamanca (WIA); Battle of the Pyrenees; Battle of Nivelle; Battle of Orthez (WIA); Battle of Bayonne
- Awards: Army Gold Medal

Major-General Sir Leonard Greenwell KCB KCH (1781–1844) was a British Army officer who served through the Napoleonic Wars.

Greenwell was born in 1781, the third son of Joshua Greenwell of Kibblesworth, of the family of Greenwell of Greenwell Ford, county Durham. He entered the army by purchase as Ensign in the 45th Regiment of Foot in 1802, became Lieutenant in 1803, and Captain in 1804. In 1806, he embarked with his regiment in the secret British invasion of South America under General Craufurd, which ultimately was sent to La Plata as a reinforcement, and took part in the operations against Buenos Aires. He landed with the regiment in Portugal on 1 August 1808, and, save on two occasions when absent on account of wounds, was present with it throughout the Peninsular War from Roliça to Toulouse.

He was in temporary command of the regiment during Massena's retreat from Torres Vedras, at the Battle of Fuentes de Oñoro, and at the final siege and fall of Badajoz. He became regimental major after the Battle of Bussaco, and received a brevet lieutenant-colonelcy after the Battle of Salamanca; he conducted the light troops of Picton's division at Orthez, and succeeded to the command of his regiment on the fall of Colonel Forbes at the Battle of Toulouse. In the course of these campaigns he was repeatedly wounded: he was shot through the body, through the neck, and through the right arm, a bullet lodged in his left arm, and another in his right leg. In 1819 Greenwell took his regiment to Ceylon, and commanded it there for six years, but was compelled to return home through ill-health before it embarked for Burma. In 1831 he was appointed commandant at Chatham, a post he vacated on promotion to Major-general on 10 January 1837.

Greenwell was a Knight Commander of both the Order of the Bath (KCB) and the Royal Guelphic Order (KCH). He had purchased all his regimental steps but one. He died in Harley Street, Cavendish Square, London, on 11 November 1844, aged 63 and was buried at Newcastle Cathedral.
