= Jean Gabriel Marchand =

French Army commander and attorney (1765–1851)

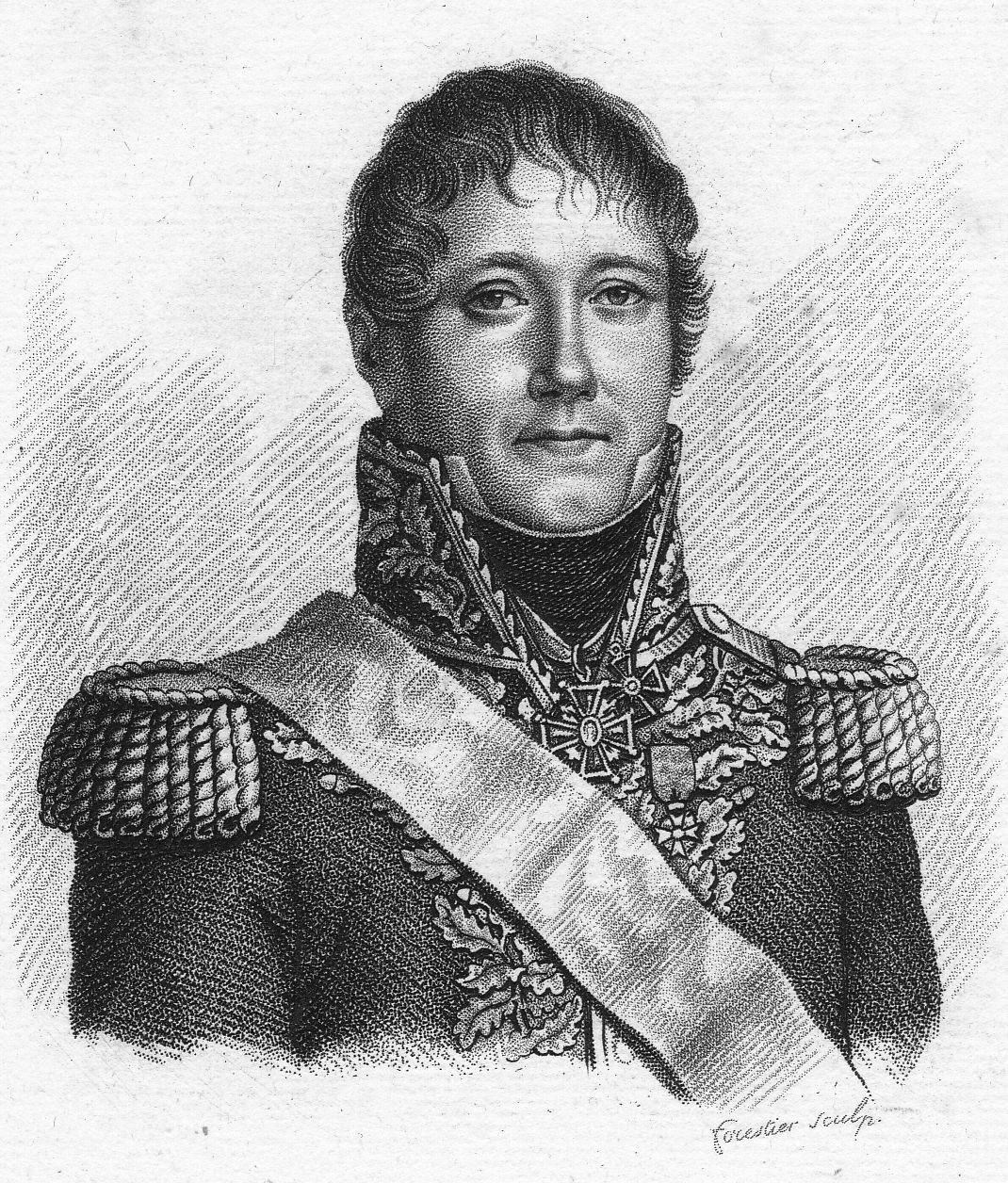
- Jean Gabriel Marchand
- Born: 10 December 1765; L'Albenc, Dauphiné, France
- Died: 12 November 1851 (aged 85); Saint-Ismier, Isère, France
- Military career
- Allegiance: France
- Branch: Staff, Infantry
- Service years: 1791–1825
- Rank: General of Division
- Conflicts: French Revolutionary Wars; Napoleonic Wars
- Awards: Légion d'Honneur
- Other work: Count of the Empire

Jean Gabriel Marchand, 1st Count Marchand (French pronunciation: [ʒɑ̃ ɡabʁijɛl maʁʃɑ̃]; 10 December 1765 – 12 November 1851) went from being an attorney to a company commander in the army of the French First Republic in 1791. He fought almost exclusively in Italy throughout the French Revolutionary Wars and served on the staffs of a number of generals. He participated in Napoleon Bonaparte's celebrated Italian campaign of 1796–1797. In 1799, he was with army commander Barthélemy Catherine Joubert when that general was killed at Novi. Promoted to general officer soon after, he transferred to the Rhine theater in 1800.

At the start of the Napoleonic Wars in 1805, Marchand led a brigade in the Grande Armée at Haslach-Jungingen and Dürenstein. Promoted to lead a division in Marshal Michel Ney's corps, he fought at Jena and Magdeburg in 1806. Leading an independent force, he defeated 3,000 Prussians late in the year. The following year he led his troops at Eylau, Guttstadt-Deppen, and Friedland. Napoleon bestowed honors and the rank of nobility upon him.

In 1808 Marchand went to Spain where he fought in the Peninsular War. In Ney's absence, he took command of the corps and suffered a humiliating defeat at Tamamés at the hands of a Spanish army. He went with Marshal André Masséna's abortive invasion of Portugal in 1810 and 1811 and fought at Ciudad Rodrigo, Almeida, and Bussaco. During the retreat he performed well in a rear guard action at Casal Novo against the British and later led his division at Fuentes de Onoro.

In 1812 he commanded a division in Russia. He fought at the head of his division at Lützen, Bautzen, and Leipzig in 1813. An Austrian division defeated his independent command near Geneva in 1814. During the Hundred Days he was tasked with stopping Napoleon's march near Grenoble, but his troops went over to the ex-emperor. For this, he was later tried by the Bourbons but acquitted. His surname is one of those names inscribed under the Arc de Triomphe.

== Revolution ==
Born in L'Albenc in the province of Dauphiné on 10 December 1765, Marchand became a lawyer and practiced in Grenoble. He joined the French army in 1791, leading a company of scouts in an Isère volunteer battalion. In the French Revolutionary Wars, he served in Italy during the years 1792–1799. He fought first in Savoy, where he won notice, then at the Siege of Toulon in 1793. Marchand became a staff officer to General Jean-Baptiste Cervoni. At the Battle of Loano on 23 and 24 November 1795, he and Colonel Jean Lannes led 200 grenadiers against an enemy redoubt armed with six cannons. They successfully stormed the fortification and ejected the Hungarian grenadiers who defended it. For this exploit, his army commander Barthélemy Louis Joseph Schérer named him chef de bataillon (major).

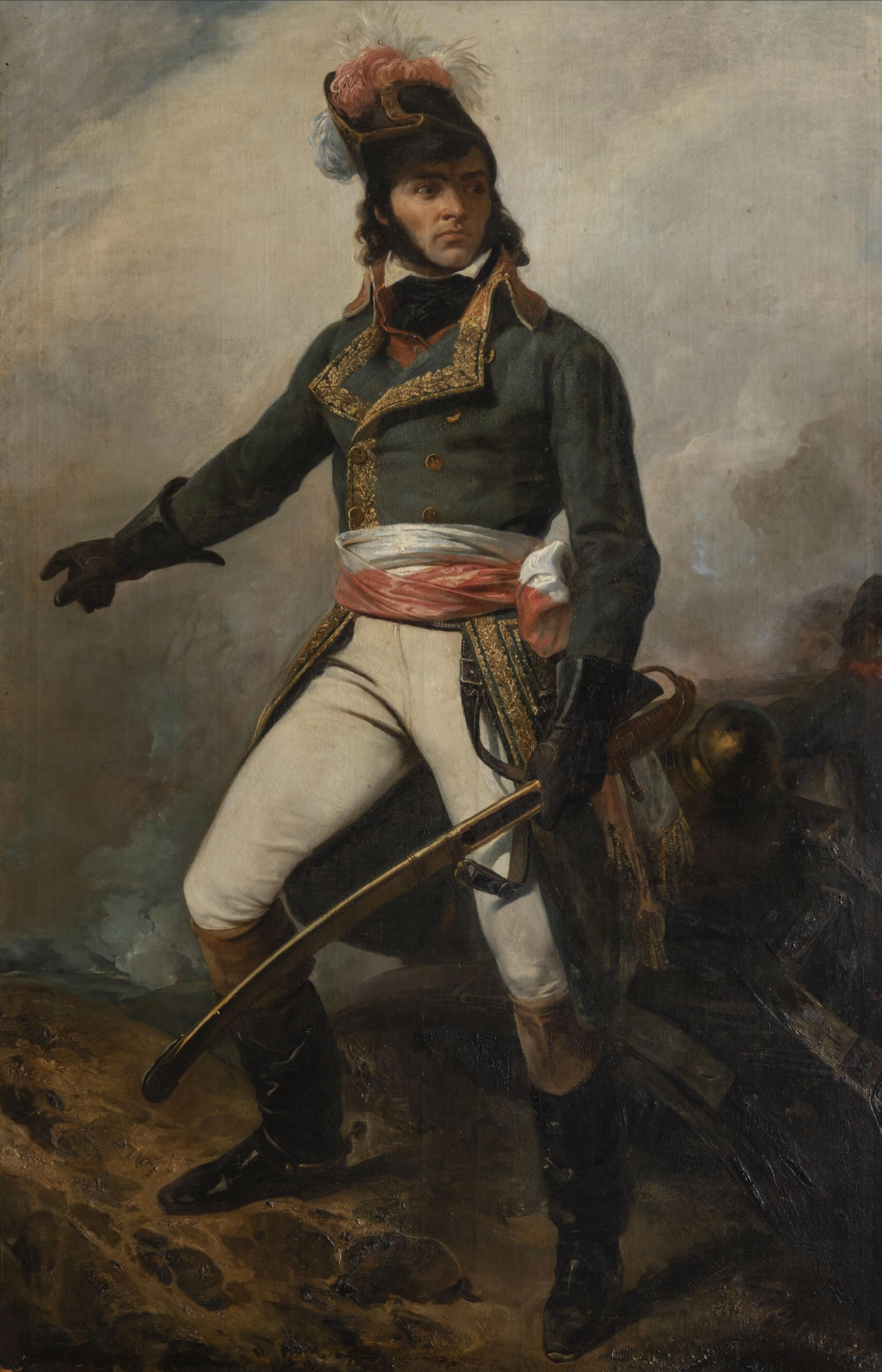
General Barthélemy Joubert

On 11 April 1796, as a junior officer on Amédée Emmanuel Francois Laharpe's staff, Marchand accompanied Napoleon Bonaparte as the new army commander scouted the terrain before the Battle of Montenotte. He participated in the battles of Ceva and Caldiero in 1796. He transferred to the staff of General Barthélemy Catherine Joubert. In June of that year, while leading 300 carabiniers of the 3rd Light Infantry Regiment, he surprised a large camp of Austrians and captured 400 of them. He was shot in the chest during an action on 29 July in the Castiglione Campaign. On 14 June 1797 he was made prisoner by the Austrians. Exchanged immediately, he was promoted to chef de brigade (colonel) two days later.

After commanding the post of Rome for a time in 1798, Marchand was dismissed, but Joubert took him back as an aide-de-camp. At the Battle of Novi on 15 August 1799, when Joubert was killed by a chance shot at the beginning of the engagement, Marchand was at his side. He was promoted to general of brigade on 13 October 1799. He fought on the Rhine the following year.

== Early Empire ==
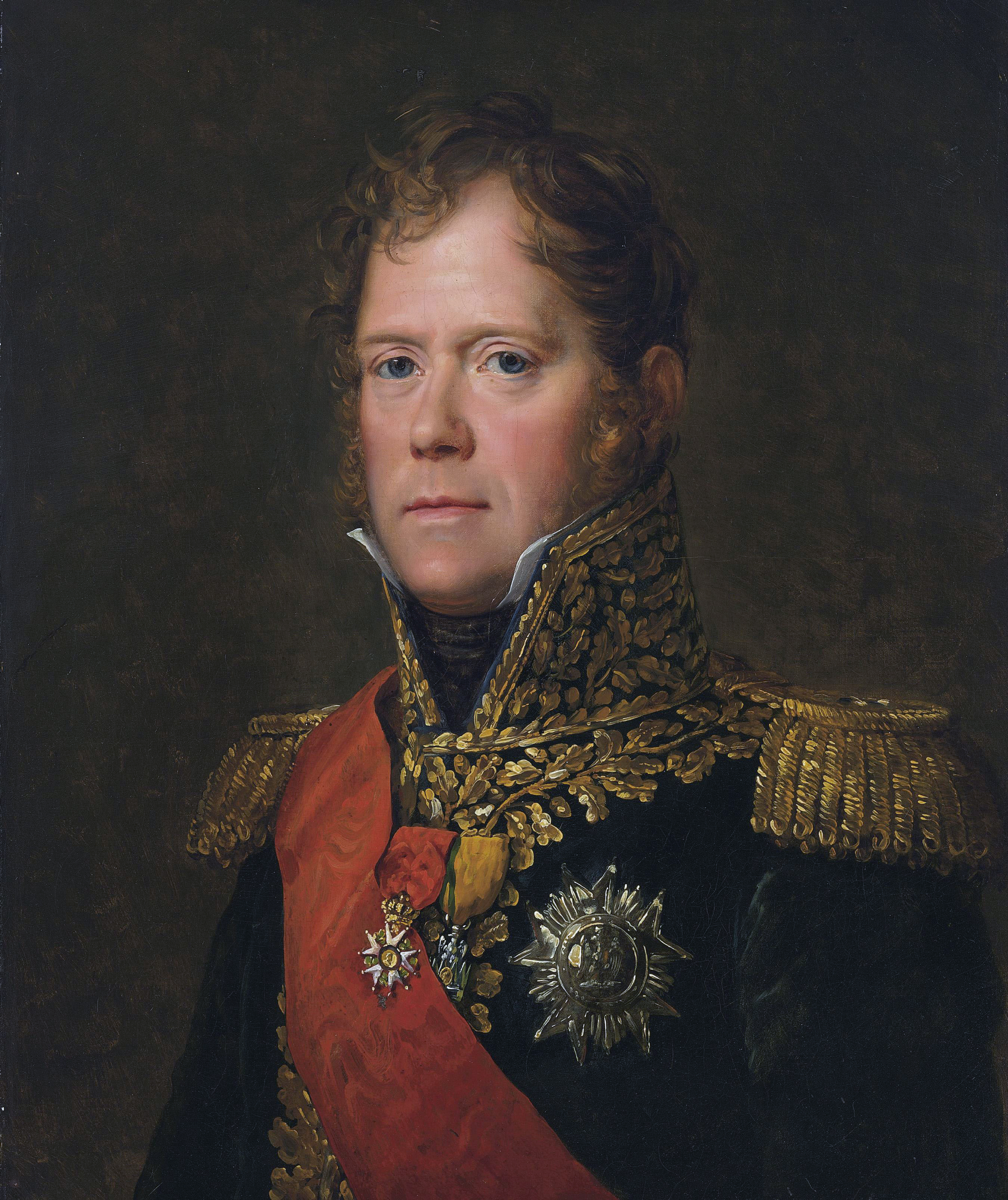
Marshal Michel Ney

In the War of the Third Coalition, Marchand commanded a brigade in Pierre Dupont de l'Etang's division of Marshal Michel Ney's VI Corps. In the Ulm Campaign, he fought at the remarkable Battle of Haslach-Jungingen, where Dupont's 5,350 infantry, 2,169 cavalry, and 18 guns held off 25,000 Austrians. The French lost 1,500 killed and wounded plus 11 guns and 900 men captured. Austrian losses numbered 1,100 killed and wounded, with 3,000 more captured. During the pursuit of Franz von Werneck's corps, Dupont's division fought in clashes at Herbrechtingen and Neresheim on 17–18 October. Marchand fought at the Battle of Dürenstein on 11 November.

Marchand won promotion to general of division on 25 December 1805. During the War of the Fourth Coalition, Marchand commanded the 1st Division in Ney's VI Corps at the Battle of Jena on 14 October 1806. General of Brigade Eugene-Casimir Villatte led the 6th Light Infantry Regiment while General of Brigade François Roguet commanded the 39th, 69th, and 76th Line Infantry Regiments. All regiments had two battalions each. His division participated in the Siege of Magdeburg from 22 October to 11 November.

As the French advanced into Poland, they clashed with the Russians and Prussians in a series of actions, the most prominent of which was the Battle of Czarnowo on 23 and 24 December 1806. On the 24th, Ney sent Marchand's division ahead to seize Działdowo (Soldau) and Mława. He arrived at Soldau at 2:00 PM on 25 December with two regiments and expelled the lone Prussian battalion he found there. Shortly afterward, his remaining two regiments joined him after marching via Mława. At 5:00 PM, Christoph Friedrich Otto Diercke's Prussian brigade turned up and attacked Soldau but was repulsed after stiff fighting. Marchand reported losing 220 casualties out of 6,000 troops and 12 guns, while Ney claimed his lieutenant inflicted 800 casualties on Diercke's 3,000 men and 8 guns. At this time, the 6th Light had temporarily been replaced by the 27th Line Infantry Regiment, while the other units remained the same. Marchand led his division at the Battle of Eylau on 8 February 1807.

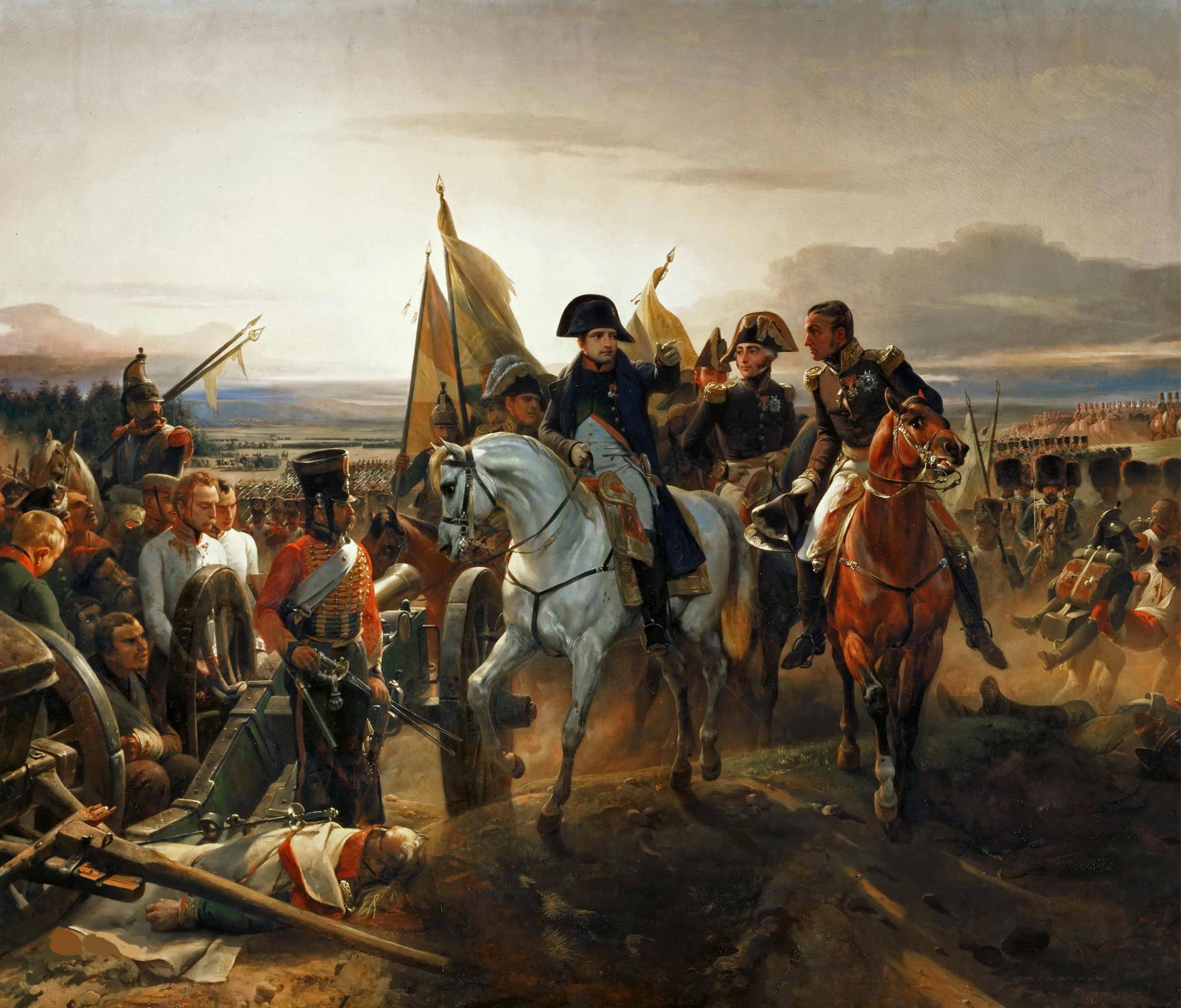
The Battle of Friedland by Horace Vernet, 1835

Levin August, Count von Bennigsen fell upon the 17,000 soldiers of Ney's VI Corps with 63,000 Russians on 5 June 1807. At the Battle of Guttstadt-Deppen, Ney fought a brilliant rear guard action before retreating behind the Pasłęka (Passarge) River. The French lost 400 killed and wounded plus 1,642 captured, while inflicting 2,500 casualties on their adversaries. At this time, Marchand's division included the 6th Light again. Marchand's division was deployed north of Dobre Miasto (Guttstadt) while Baptiste Pierre Bisson defended to the south. The two divisions gave ground slowly, relying on heavy skirmisher lines. Amazingly, Ney still held his ground to the east of the Passarge on the morning of the 6th. Adroit French generalship and Russian mistakes allowed the French to escape across the river that day.

On 14 June 1807, Marchand led his division at the Battle of Friedland. Ney's corps formed the right flank, hidden in the Sortlack Wood. At 5:30 PM, Emperor Napoleon ordered a 20-gun battery to fire a salvo, signalling Ney to attack Bennigsen's left flank. As the VI Corps burst from the forest, Marchand took position on the right while Bisson formed to his left. Sweeping Russian light troops before him, Marchand diverged slightly to the right to push his opponents into the river. This opened a gap between the two divisions, which Russian cavalry tried to exploit. With the help of Marie Victor de Fay, marquis de Latour-Maubourg's cavalry, the enemy horsemen were dispersed. As Ney's troops advanced, they were enfiladed from the opposite bank of the river by a storm of cannon fire. As the soldiers hesitated, Bennigsen hurled a mass of cavalry at Bisson's left flank, causing Ney's corps to recoil. However, Claude Perrin Victor's I Corps arrived to beat back the Russians. This gave Ney and his officers time to rally the VI Corps and repulse the Russian Imperial Guard. At 8:30 PM, the troops of Marchand and Bisson seized Friedland itself.

On 13 July, Napoleon awarded Marchand the Grand Eagle of the Légion d'Honneur. This honor was followed by his appointment as a Count of the Empire on 26 October 1808.

== Peninsular War ==
Still commanding Ney's 1st Division, Marchand participated in Napoleon's 1808 invasion of Spain. In February 1809, his division numbered 6,860 soldiers in 12 battalions. In early 1809, Ney campaigned in Galicia but his 17,000 French soldiers had their hands full trying to control 10,000 square miles (26,000 km^{2}) of territory. On 19 May there was a clash at Gallegos where Marchand's division was involved. Pedro Caro, 3rd Marquis of la Romana with 1,500 regulars and 8,000 militia attacked Antoine Louis Popon de Maucune's 3,000-man brigade, inflicting 500 casualties. Ney soon arrived with the remainder of the 1st Division and drove La Romana away. Finally, in mid-June, Ney abandoned Galicia and fell back to Astorga.

In June 1809, Napoleon placed the VI Corps under Marshal Nicolas Soult's command. With Ney's troops, plus the II and V Corps, Soult planned to sweep south and destroy Arthur Wellesley's British army. Wellesley beat King Joseph Bonaparte and Marshal Jean-Baptiste Jourdan at the Battle of Talavera on 28 July. When Spanish guerillas captured a French dispatch, the British general found out that Soult was coming down from the north with three corps. Wellesley immediately bolted back toward Portugal and escaped the trap. During these operations, Ney's advanced guard clashed with a column under Robert Wilson at the Battle of Puerto de Baños on 12 August, but Marchand's troops were not engaged.

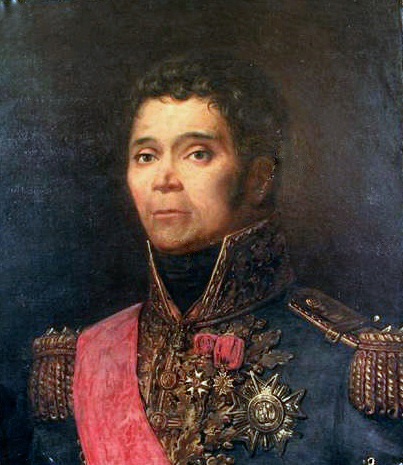
François Kellermann

In the fall of 1809, the Spanish army of Diego de Cañas y Portocarrero, Duke del Parque launched an offensive against the VI Corps. With Ney on leave, Marchand took command and suffered a stinging defeat at the Battle of Tamamés on 18 October 1809. With only 14,000 men and 14 artillery pieces, he tried to oust del Parque's 20,000 infantry, 1,500 cavalry, and 18 guns from a ridge. Sending Maucune's brigade to attack the Spanish left flank and the 25th Light Infantry to pin the enemy right flank, he planned to send the brigade of Pierre-Louis Binet de Marcognet to crush del Parque's center. Maucune's attack made considerable progress, but Marcognet's assault stalled in the face of heavy musketry and the fire of 12 cannons. Falling into confusion, Marcognet's men finally fled downhill and Marchand had to bring up Mathieu Delabassée's reserve brigade to prevent a rout. His corps suffered 1,400 casualties while the Spanish only lost half as many.

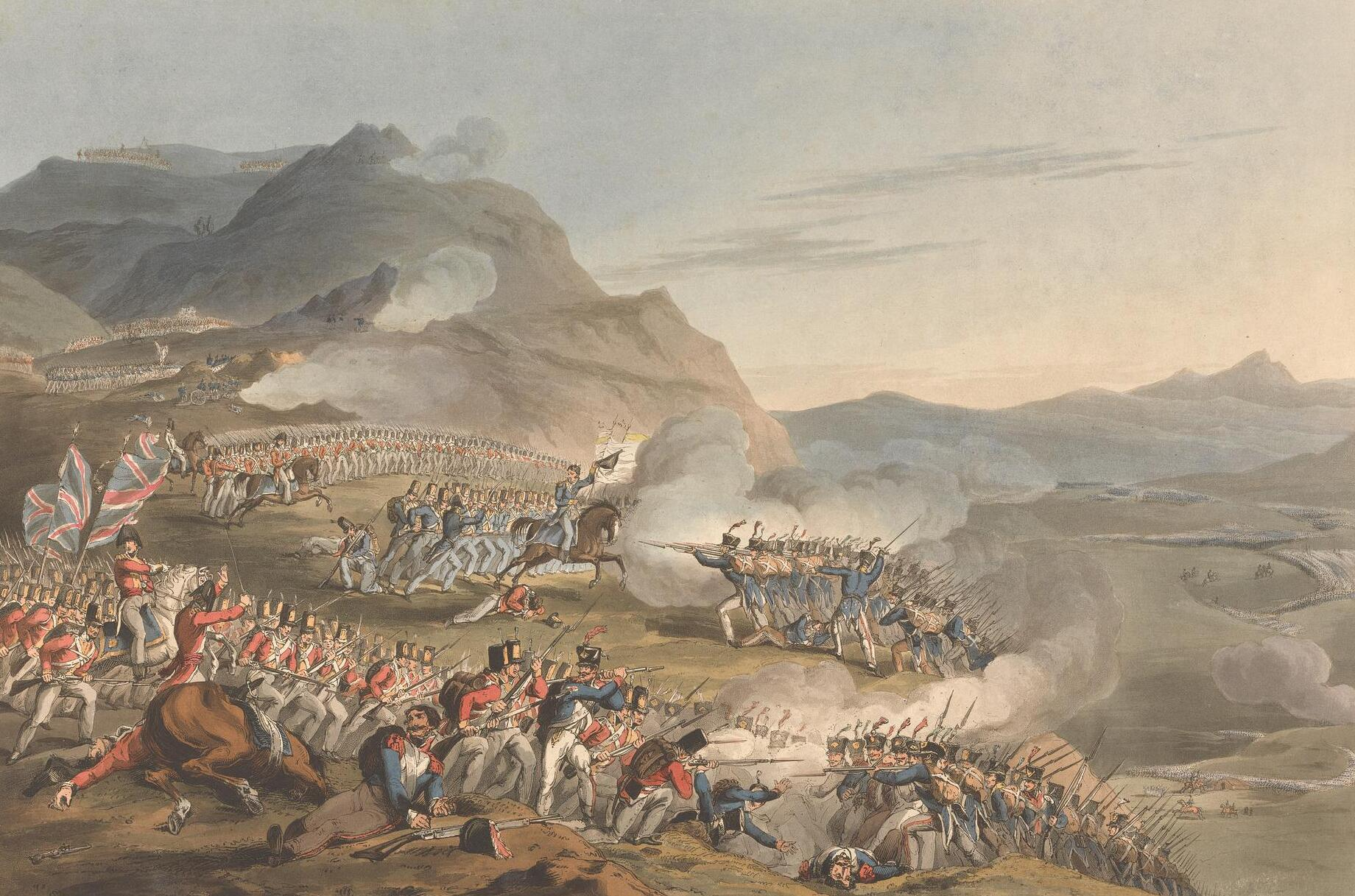
Battle of Bussaco

Marchand evacuated his headquarters at Salamanca and retired north to Toro where François Étienne de Kellermann joined him with a dragoon division and some infantry. With Kellermann in overall command, the French recovered Salamanca. Dropping off Marchand and the VI Corps, Kellermann returned north to suppress new guerilla attacks. At this, Del Parque promptly advanced with superior forces, compelling Marchand to abandon Salamanca again. Learning that the main Spanish army had been smashed at the Battle of Ocana and fearing retribution, del Parque withdrew toward his mountain refuge. Meanwhile, Kellermann reappeared with his cavalry, joined Marchand, and launched a pursuit. The French cavalry found del Parque astride a river crossing at Alba de Tormes and mounted a devastating attack. On 28 November, Kellermann routed del Parque at the Battle of Alba de Tormes. Most of the fighting was over by the time Marchand's infantry arrived, though they managed to seize the vital bridge and town from the Spanish rear guard. For the loss of 300 to 600 men, the French inflicted 2,000 killed and wounded on del Parque's army. The French also captured 1,000 Spaniards, nine cannons, and most of the baggage train.

Marchand served under Ney again in Marshal André Masséna's third invasion of Portugal in 1810. He fought at the Siege of Ciudad Rodrigo from 26 April to 9 July 1810 and the Siege of Almeida from 25 July to 27 August. On 15 September, Marchand's 1st Division consisted of Maucune's 1st Brigade, the 6th Light and 69th Line, and Marcognet's 2nd Brigade, the 39th and 76th Line. There were 6,457 men and 214 officers in the division. At the Battle of Bussaco on 27 September, Louis Henri Loison's division led the attack up the main road toward to top of the ridge. Fighting its way through knots of British and Portuguese skirmishers, it was met at the crest by British infantry and artillery and defeated. Too late to support Loison, one of Marchand's brigades neared the top of the ridge. Because of hostile artillery fire it strayed to the left of the road. Marchand's attack was beaten by Denis Pack's Portuguese brigade. His division suffered the loss of 1,173 men while Loison's division sustained 1,252 casualties.

With the rest of the Army of Portugal, Marchand spent the winter before the Lines of Torres Vedras. The next spring, he fought in the rear guard actions of Pombal on 11 March 1811 and Redinha on 12 March during the retreat from Portugal. On 14 March 1811, he gave the Marquess of Wellington's famous Light Division a bloody nose in the Battle of Casal Novo. Sir William Erskine, 2nd Baronet marched his 7,000 troops and six artillery pieces forward in a heavy fog without proper scouts. As the fog cleared, the Allies found Marchand's 4,600 men and six guns deployed across the road ready to receive them. During the action, the French lost 55 casualties but inflicted 155 killed and wounded on their opponents. On the 15th, Marchand's division suffered a defeat at the Battle of Foz de Arouce, losing 250 men and the eagle of the 39th Line. Allied casualties were only 71. In early May, he led his division at the Battle of Fuentes de Onoro, where part of it participated in the first day's attack on the village. Two days later, his infantry flushed the British 85th Foot and the Portuguese 2nd Caçadores out of the village of Pozo Bello into the open, where the two battalions were roughed up by French cavalry. Wellington soon managed to fend off the attack and forced Masséna to withdraw. Shortly after the engagement, Marshal Auguste Marmont arrived to replace Masséna. The new commander abolished the corps organization and sent Marchand and other generals home.

== Later Empire and Restoration ==
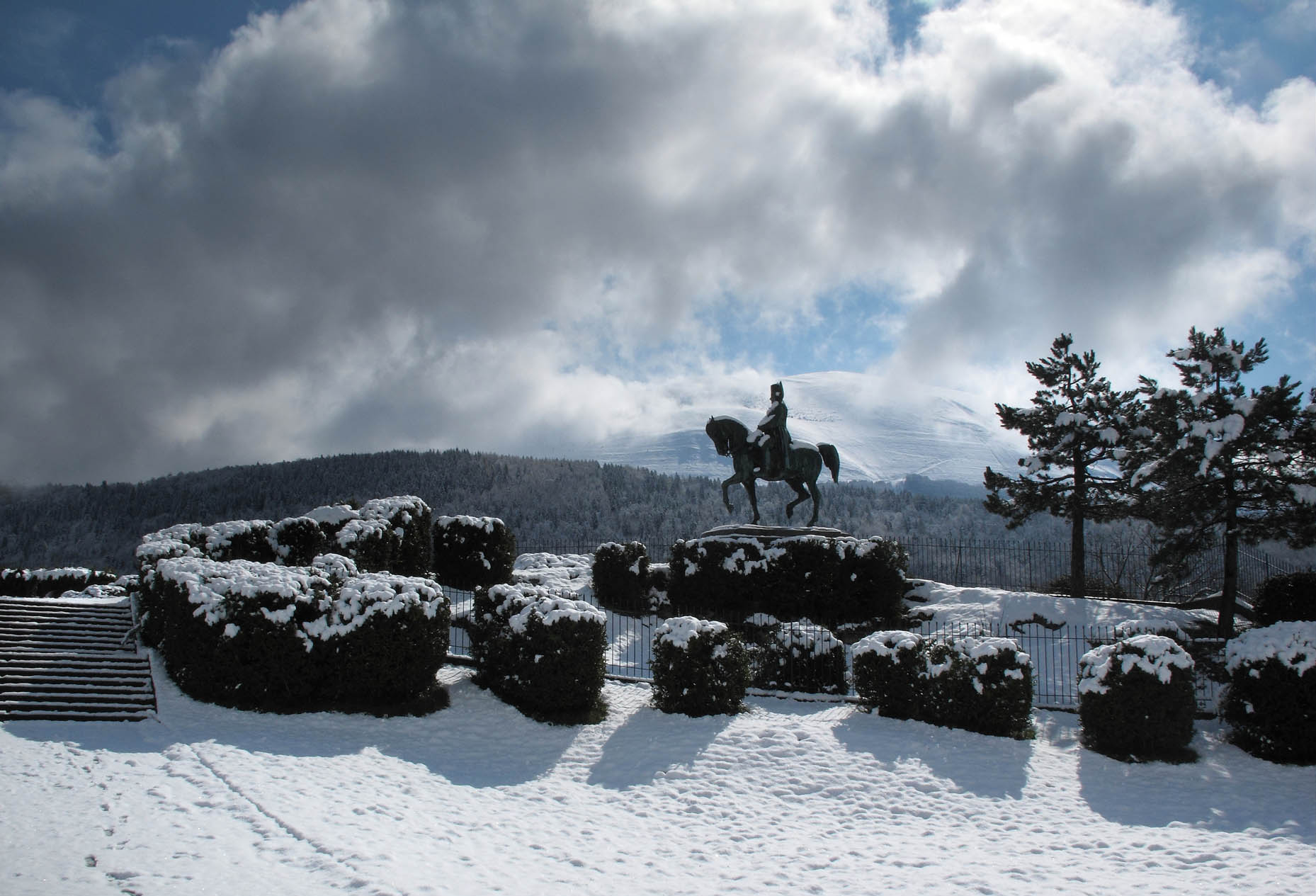
Statue of Napoleon at the meadow meeting place near Laffrey

The start of Napoleon's invasion of Russia found Marchand serving as Jérôme Bonaparte's chief of staff. Later, he took command of the 25th Division in Ney's III Corps. He led the division at the battles of Smolensk and Borodino.

In 1813, Marchand commanded the 39th Division. General-major Stockhorn's brigade consisted of troops from the Grand Duchy of Baden, 2 battalions each of the Stockhorn Infantry Regiment Nr. 1 and the Crown Prince Infantry Regiment Nr. 3, and a Baden foot artillery battery. General-major Prince Emil's brigade was made up of soldiers from the Grand Duchy of Hesse, 2 battalions each of the Foot Guard, Life Guard, and 2nd Infantry Regiments, and a Hessian foot artillery battery. Marchand was present with Ney's III Corps at the battles of Lützen and Bautzen. He led his troops in Marshal Jacques MacDonald's XI Corps at the Battle of Leipzig. After his Germans abandoned the French alliance, he was responsible for defending the Department of Isère in the 1814 campaign. While commanding 11,000 troops at Saint-Julien-en-Genevois on 1 March 1814, he was defeated by Johann Nepomuk Joseph von Klebelsberg and a 6,000-man Austrian division. His forces lost 1,000 killed and wounded plus five guns and 300 men captured, while his opponents suffered 650 casualties.

== Hundred Days ==
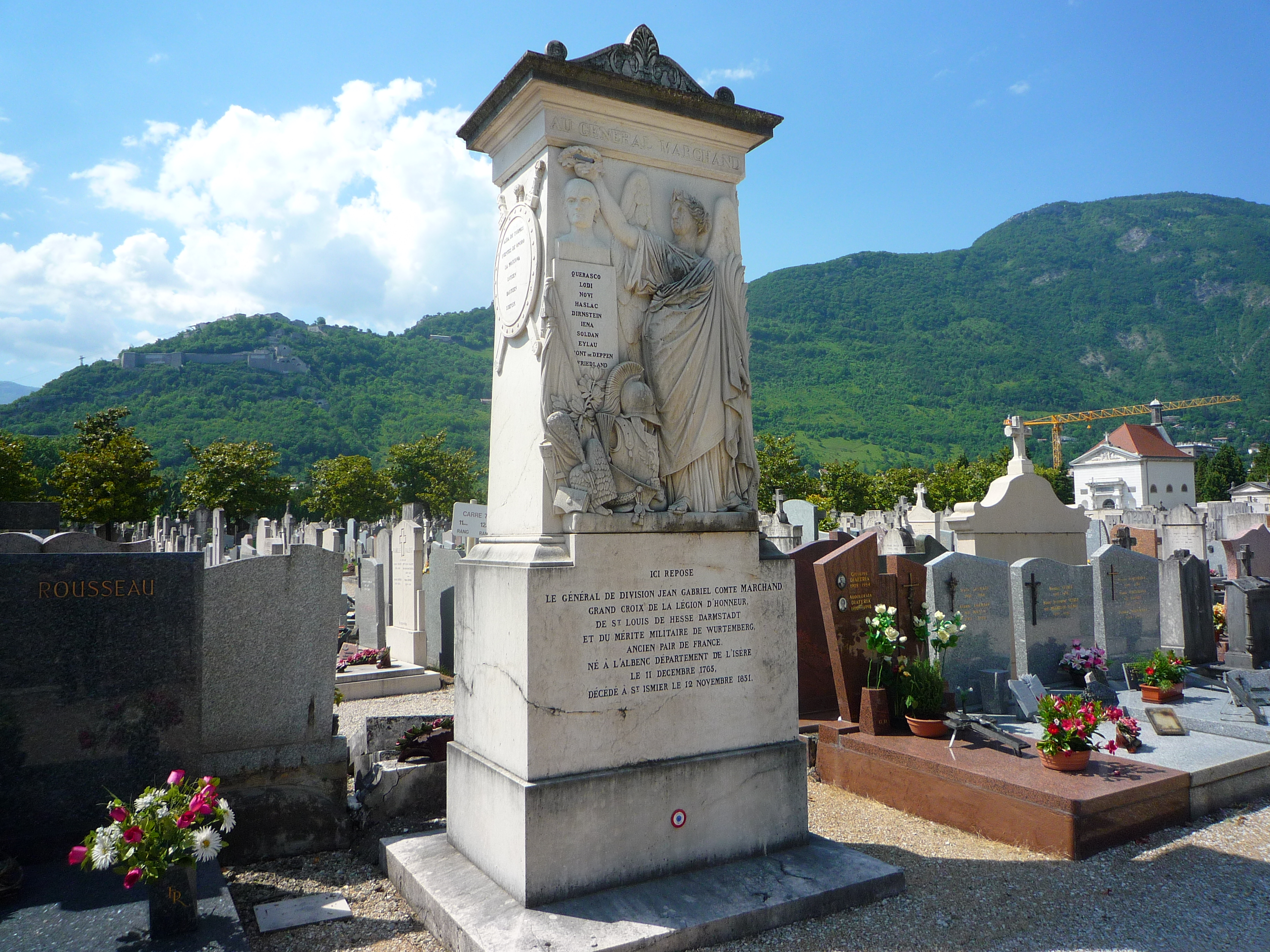
Marchand's grave marker in Saint Roch Cemetery

After Napoleon's return from Elba, the former emperor marched on Grenoble with about 1,000 troops. By 6 March 1815, Napoleon's little force reached Gap, south of Grenoble. Marchand was in charge the 7th Military Division, headquartered in Grenoble (comprising Isère, Hautes-Alpes, Drôme, Léman, and Mont-Blanc), with the Régiment des Hussards de Monsieur, three battalions each of the Régiment de Duc d'Angoulème (former 5th), Régiment de Duc d'Orléans (former 7th), and elements of the 3rd Engineer Regiment. He sent Colonel Lessard with one battalion of the 5th Line and a company of sappers to blow the bridge at Ponhaut. Lessard bumped into Napoleon's force and withdrew to a defile near Laffrey. When the column from Elba appeared on 7 March, Napoleon walked forward alone toward the levelled muskets of the 5th Line. The soldiers immediately went over to his side in a body. On 8 March Napoleon was joined by the 7th Line and its Colonel Charles de la Bédoyère, who also defected to him. That day, Marchand closed the gates of Grenoble and insisted that the cannons be loaded and trained. Fearing that he and his soldiers would be attacked by the enraged Grenoble mob, Marchand's artillery officer, a royalist, offered to surrender to Napoleon if his safety was guaranteed. At once the citizens of Grenoble dismantled the gates and let Napoleon's column into the city.

After Napoleon's final defeat at the Battle of Waterloo, the Bourbons accused Marchand of delivering Grenoble to the former emperor. Dismissed from his command on 4 January 1816, he was hauled before a court-martial in Besançon and acquitted after a six-month trial. He was taken off active service in 1818. He retired from the army in 1825 and died on 12 November 1851 at Saint-Ismier in the Isère department. MARCHAND is engraved on Column 26 of the Arc de Triomphe.
