= Eagle & Pearl Jewelers =

American jewelry retailer

Eagle & Pearl Jewelers (colloquially known as Eagle & Pearl) is an American jewelry retailer headquartered in Colorado. In 2020, it celebrated its 290th anniversary and is one of the world's oldest jewelry stores still in operation. It sells gemstone, pearl and unique designer gold and sterling silver jewelry. Eagle & Pearl is known for partnering with internationally acclaimed award-winning jewelry designers from around the world.

Eagle & Pearl was founded in 1730 by the jouaillier (high jeweler) Francois (Francis) Fleuriau and later Peter Parquot, a fellow French descendant whose trade cards were written in English and French and whose family had relocated to England from France in the early 1700s. Eagle & Pearl has remained family owned since its founding and the current co-owner is Peter's 6th great grandson and John Treweek's, who operated what became the main store on Princes Court, London, 4th great grandson. The family moved the business from the U.K. to the U.S. in 2005, moving away from traditional brick and mortar stores to online retail. At present, Eagle & Pearl operates only in the United States.

== History ==
=== Establishment ===
Founded in 1730 by Francois (Francis) Fleuriau, a "jouaillier & orfeure", (high jeweler and goldsmith), the first Eagle and Pearl store was located on Duke Street, London, United Kingdom and later joined in 1744 by Peter Parquot, who with the sum of 800 British pounds bequeathed to him on 9 June 1743 by Jean Maillefaud, the brother of his wife Susanna Patras Maillefaud, who was a granddaughter of Jean Jacques Maillefaud, a Counselor to King Louis XIV. The money left to Peter by Jean financed his first store on Kings Road, facing Nassau Street, in St. Ann's, London. Peter began his apprenticeship as a jeweler with Andrew Mayaffre, a French jouaillier, in Convent Garden, London, on 28 November 1730. Until 1750, Eagle and Pearl produced jewelry in house mainly for noble exiles from France and accepted purchases on credit, but Francois and Peter later moved to accept both credit and cash. Shortly after 1750, jewelry was priced at fixed prices, a practice first introduced in 1750 by Palmer's of London Bridge.

Parquot was known to have created a ring with a large brilliant diamond named the Maillefaud ring, and in the 1761 will of his wife Susanna, she bequeathed a ring as described, along with several others, to her daughter Susanna, and to another a collection of rings, one described as emerald with four brilliant diamonds. All of significant historical value to the company.

During the 18th Century, Eagle & Pearl expanded rapidly as a consortium of owner operators with locations throughout London. The group pooled resources to obtain preferred prices of materials and assisted each other with advancing jewelry design and manufacture.

=== 1751 ===
In 1751, Paul Bouillard joined Eagle and Pearl and a store was opened on Great Suffolk Street, Haymarket, London.

=== 1752 ===
In 1752, James Brown joined Eagle and Pearl and a store was opened on Church Street, Soho, London.

=== 1755 ===
In 1755, Charles Fleuriau joined Eagle and Pearl and a store was opened on Craven Street, London.

=== 1760 ===
In 1760, an Eagle & Pearl store was opened in Tavistock Street, Convent Garden, London, which was operated by jeweler William Park Fisher.

=== 1772 ===
In 1772, an Eagle & Pearl store was opened at No. 9, Eagle and Pearl, opposite Brook Street in Holborn, London, which was operated until 1802 by jewelers, Richard and Letitia Clarke, and between 1790 and 1793, a relative of Richard, M. Clarke, was a jeweler at the same address.

=== 1780 ===
In 1780, Joseph Silver joined Eagle and Pearl and a store is opened at No. 113 Fetter Lane, London. In 1790, Joseph moved to No. 28, Hatton Garden, London (1790-1832) and then to No. 51, Hatton Garden, London (1838 and 1839).

=== 1802 - 2002 ===
Eagle & Pearl operated locally in London, U.K. During the early to mid 1800s, John Treweek operated what became the main store located on Princes Court, St. Lukes, and was continued there for some time by his descendants.

After the expansion of the 18th century, Eagle & Pearl suffered from the effects of continuous wars during the 19th and 20th centuries and many of the owner operators either accepted voluntary insolvency due to a lack of heirs and adequately trained employees or separated their stores from the consortium.

In 1849, the Eagle and Pearl store on Great Suffolk Street was mentioned in the novel titled "The King and the Countess" where a maid was sent by Gardelle, the master of the house, to the store with a letter to request a receipt be written by Mr. Broshet, the owner of the store, and was signed for by the maid and returned to Gardelle.

In Russia watches set with gems were fashionable among the royalty and the wealthy. The Kremlin Museum has a number of them, including a gem-set watch by Peter Parquot Sr, made probably in a Dresden workshop, with a rock crystal and enamel case from the Cabinet of Tsar Nicolas II of Russia (Inv. M3-4143).

=== 2002 - 2005 ===
The current owners have continued Eagle & Pearl and in 2002 purchased a 10-year lease on a retail space in Lincoln, U.K. After extensive renovations to the Lincoln property, the lease for the property was sold and the company became an online retailer.

=== 2005 to Present ===
In 2005, The current owners relocated from England to the United States, moving the Eagle & Pearl operation to the U.S., which currently imports and sells jewelry made by Fei Liu, Kit Heath and Clogau.
