= Jean Jacques Maillefaud =

Jean Jacques de Maillefaud (1635–1696), was Counselor to King Louis XIV, Chatelain d'Allieres, and a member of the Dauphiné Parliament. He was born in Grenoble of a French Huguenot family.

== Life ==
Jean Jacques was a protestant noble born in 1635 in France and was the only son of Jean de Maillefaud (born: 1583) and Isabeau Oddoz de Bonniot, daughter of Claude Oddoz de Bonniot. The family originates from Die, where there is a hamlet with their name, and they held honorable rank for several centuries. Jean Jacques was Chatelain d'Allieres and was made counselor to King Louis XIV, a courtier at Versailles, and a member of the Dauphine parliament in Grenoble. When King Louis ordered the Edict of Fontainebleau (22 October 1685), which effectively revoked the Edict of Nantes (April 1598), Jean Jacques advised against it and remained in France with his wife and three of their children to help Huguenot protestants flee France to England and the Netherlands.

=== Marriage and Children ===
On 16 September 1671, Jean Jacques married Jeanne Patras (1640–1715) in L'Albenc, Isère, Rhone-Alps, France. Jeanne was the daughter of Antoine Patras (born: 1612) and Francoise Royer (born: 1610) and was half-sister of Abraham Patras, the Governor-General of the Dutch East Indies.

Jean Jacques and Jeanne had six children:

- Daniel de Maillefaud, born 31 January 1681 in Grenoble, France and died in 1746 in L'Albenc, France, was Chatelain de l'Albenc. Daniel married (1) Francoise de Gumin, daughter of Joseph, Count de Gumin, and Marie de Pontis, and (2) Suzanne Tondard.
- David de Maillefaud
- Elisabeth de Maillefaud, who married Henri de Beaufort, lord of Perier.
- Antoine de Maillefaud, born 1692 in Grenoble, France. Antoine married Ester Gerard (born: 1697) and was exiled in England, where in London he helped receive Huguenot protestant who had fled France.
- Anne de Maillefaud, who married Andre Gerard.
- Marguerite de Maillefaud, who married in 1707 a noble named Issac Tholosan, in Zurich, a native of Embrun.

=== Death ===
Jean Jacques died in 1696 at Saint-Jean-d'Herans, Isère, Rhone-Alps, France.

==== Arms ====
d'or, au chevron de sable, au chef d'azur, charge de trois etoiles d'or.
