= Château de l'Alba =

15th-century converted castle in France

Coordinates: 45°13′36.5″N 5°26′32″E

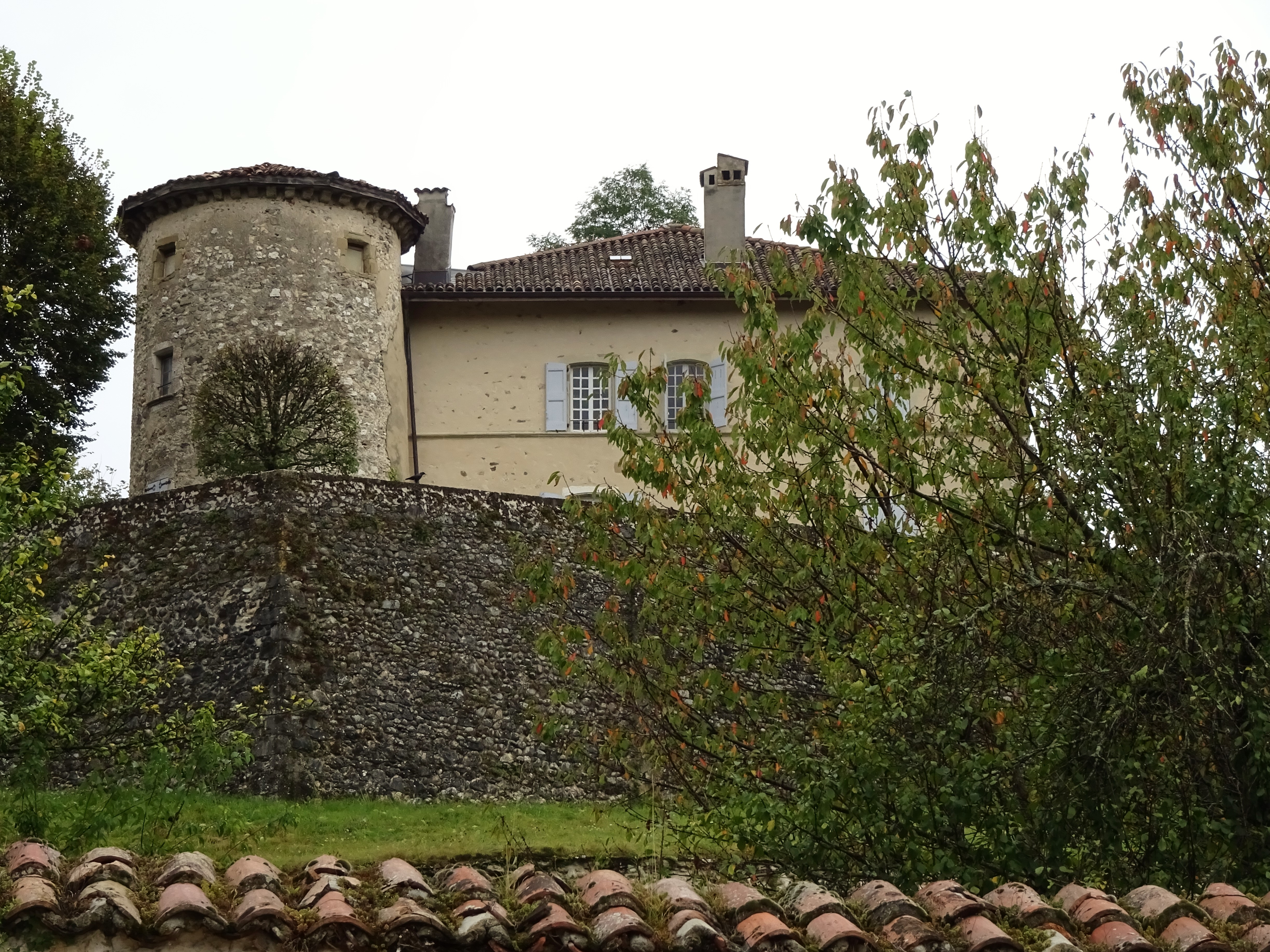
Château de l'Alba

The Château de l'Alba is a 15th-century castle, remodelled as a château in the 18th century, located in the commune of L'Albenc in the Isère département of France.

The château is closed to the public. It was partially listed as a monument historique in 1978.

== See also ==
- List of castles in France
