= L'Albenc =

- Commune
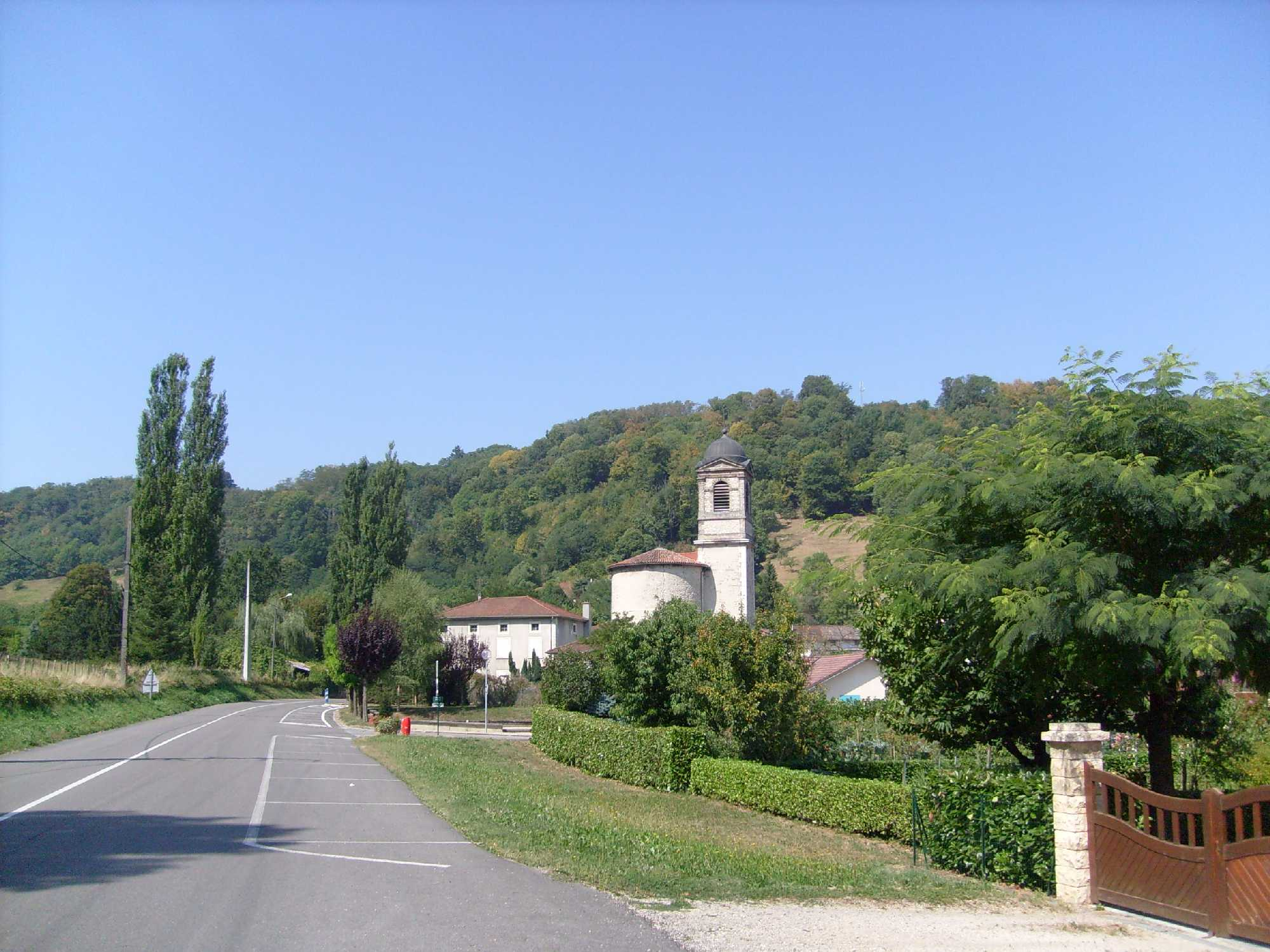
- L'Albenc village

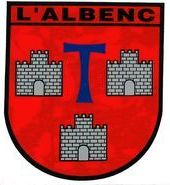
- Coat of arms
- Location of L'Albenc
- Location within France Location within Auvergne-Rhône-Alpes
- Coordinates: 45°13′33″N 5°26′28″E
- Country: France
- Region: Auvergne-Rhône-Alpes
- Department: Isère
- Arrondissement: Grenoble
- Canton: Le Sud Grésivaudan
- Intercommunality: Saint-Marcellin Vercors Isère Communauté

Government
  - Mayor (2020–2026): Albert Buisson
- Area^{1}: 9.86 km^{2} (3.81 sq mi)
- Highest elevation: 415 m (1,362 ft)
- Lowest elevation: 170 m (560 ft)
- Population (2023): 1,255
  - Density: 127/km^{2} (330/sq mi)
- Time zone: UTC+01:00 (CET)
  - Summer (DST): UTC+02:00 (CEST)
- INSEE/Postal code: 38004 /38470
- ^{1} French Land Register data, which excludes lakes, ponds, glaciers > 1 km^{2} (0.386 sq mi or 247 acres) and river estuaries.

L'Albenc (French pronunciation: [lalbɛ̃k]) is a commune in the Isère department in the Auvergne-Rhône-Alpes region of southeastern France.

== Geography ==
The commune lies in a straight line some 25 kilometres west by north-west of Grenoble, 20 kilometres south-west of Voiron and 40 kilometres northeast of Romans-sur-Isere in the lower Gresivaudan valley. The highest point of the commune is at 437 metres overlooking the hamlets of Chapuisière and Pierre Brun. The lowest point is on the banks of the Isère at 170 metres. The main peaks in the commune are the Malan (373 metres) just south of the town, Mount Larron (384 metres), and the Côte Belle peaking at 437 metres.

The commune lies on the opposite side of the mountains from Grenoble so can not be reached directly from there. The A49 autoroute from Saint-Quentin-sur-Isère in the north-east passes south-west through the eastern part of the commune and continues towards Romans-sur-Isère in the south-west. There is however no exit to the commune from this autoroute and access is by road D1092 from Vinay in the south-west passing north-east through the town and continuing north by north-east to Tullins. The D35 road also goes from the village south-east over a tortuous mountain route eventually joining the D531 road in the south. There are many small roads covering the whole commune which is mixed forest with some farmland. In addition to the town there is the village of Riquetiere in the south on the right bank of the Isère. A railway line passes through the commune from Vinay in the south and passes through a tunnel to exit the commune in the north-east. There is no station in the commune with the nearest station being at Vinay.

The south-western border of the commune is the Isère river although there is a small portion of the commune on the left bank. The Leze stream rises in the north of the commune and passes through the village before turning east to join the Isere. The Fosse des Mortes also flows into the Isere in the north-east of the commune. The Versoud flows into the Isère from the part of the commune on the left bank.

=== Neighbouring communes and villages ===
Source:

== Toponymy ==
L'Albenc appeared in the forms: Albencium in the 14th century and Albenco in 1497.

Several theories attempt to explain the origin of the name of this commune. Albenc could be an alteration of the word Alpenc which is from the Alps whose name came from the 1st century BC and which came from a Celtic or pre-Celtic root alp designating a height or a mountain. The alternation between B and P is fairly common, Alpenc would then become Albenc. The suffix -enc is of Ligurian origin and designates proximity or membership. So the construction Alb-enc would literally say "near the mountain".

A second hypothesis refers to the Occitan albenc meaning "incandescent" or "shining white" from the Latin albus meaning "white". This would be after the colour of snow which at the time could cover the surrounding mountains or alternatively the sand which is the foundation of the village. Most likely the shade of the white poplars (alba in Occitan) on the banks of the Isere.

=== Heraldry ===
Arms of L'Albenc	Blazon: Gules, a Tau azure with 3 castles embattled tower and door argent masoned in sable 2 and 1, in chief the Arial letters L'ALBENC the same.

== Administration ==
List of Successive Mayors of L'Albenc

From	To	Name	Party
2001	2014	Albert Buisson	ind.
2014	2020	Ghislaine Zamora	UDI
2020	2026	Albert Buisson	

== Population ==
The inhabitants of the commune are known as Albinois or Albinoises in French.

Historical population

Year	Pop.	±% p.a.
1793	1,061	—
1800	1,086	+0.33%
1806	1,112	+0.40%
1821	1,186	+0.43%
1831	1,094	−0.80%
1836	1,332	+4.02%
1841	1,323	−0.14%
1846	1,382	+0.88%
1851	1,335	−0.69%
1856	1,218	−1.82%
1861	1,156	−1.04%
1866	1,145	−0.19%
1872	1,005	−2.15%
1876	929	−1.95%
1881	881	−1.06%
1886	903	+0.49%
1891	881	−0.49%
1896	901	+0.45%
1901	851	−1.14%

Year	Pop.	±% p.a.
1906	887	+0.83%
1911	836	−1.18%
1921	724	−1.43%
1926	833	+2.84%
1931	773	−1.48%
1936	740	−0.87%
1946	680	−0.84%
1954	707	+0.49%
1962	679	−0.50%
1968	705	+0.63%
1975	653	−1.09%
1982	751	+2.02%
1990	895	+2.22%
1999	991	+1.14%
2007	1,068	+0.94%
2012	1,104	+0.67%
2017	1,244	+2.42%
2023	1,255	+0.15%

Source: EHESS and INSEE

== Sites and Monuments ==
- The Château de l'Alba (or Albe or Montravel) (15th century) has been classed as a historical monument since 28 December 1978. Built on a rocky outcrop and exposed on the south side, this 15th-century building, renovated and rebuilt in the 18th century was listed as a historical monument due to its façades and roofs, terraces with their retaining walls, a dining room with a fountain, the cellar-level kitchen, the large living room on the ground floor, and the northwest room. It reflects the architecture used for the construction of these noble houses flanked by corner towers as there are many in Isère. The chateau was built by the Châtelet family in 1578, who were the owners of the fortified chateau of Poliénas, thanks to 60,000 gold florins that they received as compensation for the dismantling of that castle ordered by Gordes since it posed a threat to the region as it was susceptible to attack by the Protestants. The chateau still belongs to the descendants of this family - the Annoux family.
- The Châteauneuf de l'Albenc was razed in 1578 by the Catholics during the Wars of religion to subdue this region which had a Protestant majority. There remains today only a few observable traces.
- The Chateau of Peccatière was destroyed in the 1970s.
- The Old Courthouse
- Medieval houses
- The Church contains a Bronze Bell (1511) which is registered as an historical object.

== Transport ==
The town is accessible by the D1092 road that connects the towns of Romans-sur-Isère and Moirans. The A49 autoroute that runs through the commune has an exit near to Vinay.

=== Intercommunal Transport ===
Inter-Urban Transport via the Transisère network from the General Council of Isere gathers together all operators. L'Albenc is also served by the following routes: VIN04: Cognin-les-Gorges ↔ Rovon ↔ St. Gervais ↔ Vinay CSA08: Saint-Marcellin ↔ Tullins ↔ La Côte-Saint-André Mar13: Poliénas ↔ ↔ The Albenc Vinay ↔ Saint-Marcellin VIN08: Chantesse ↔ ↔ The Albenc Vinay 5200: Saint-Marcellin ↔ Moirans ↔ Grenoble SJM03: Saint-Gervais ↔ Poliénas ↔ Saint-Jean-de-Moirans

=== Rail transport ===
L'Albenc does not have a railway station, so people wishing to join the TER regional rapid transport rail network can go to the following stations: On line No. 61 TER Rhône-Alpes (Grenoble-Valence) - Vinay (4 km from L'Ablenc) - Poliénas (7.5 km from L'Ablenc)

== Education ==
A school provides public primary education in l'Albenc. During the 2009–2010 school year 148 students were enrolled, 52 in kindergarten and 96 primary students. The pupils were divided into six classes. Secondary education is not provided on the communal territory - the nearest College is the Joseph Chassigneux College at Vinay. The commune is part of the Academic District of Grenoble.

The town school is managed by the Inspector-General of the Departmental Inspectorate of National Education 1, rue Joseph Chanrion at Grenoble.

== Ecosystem ==
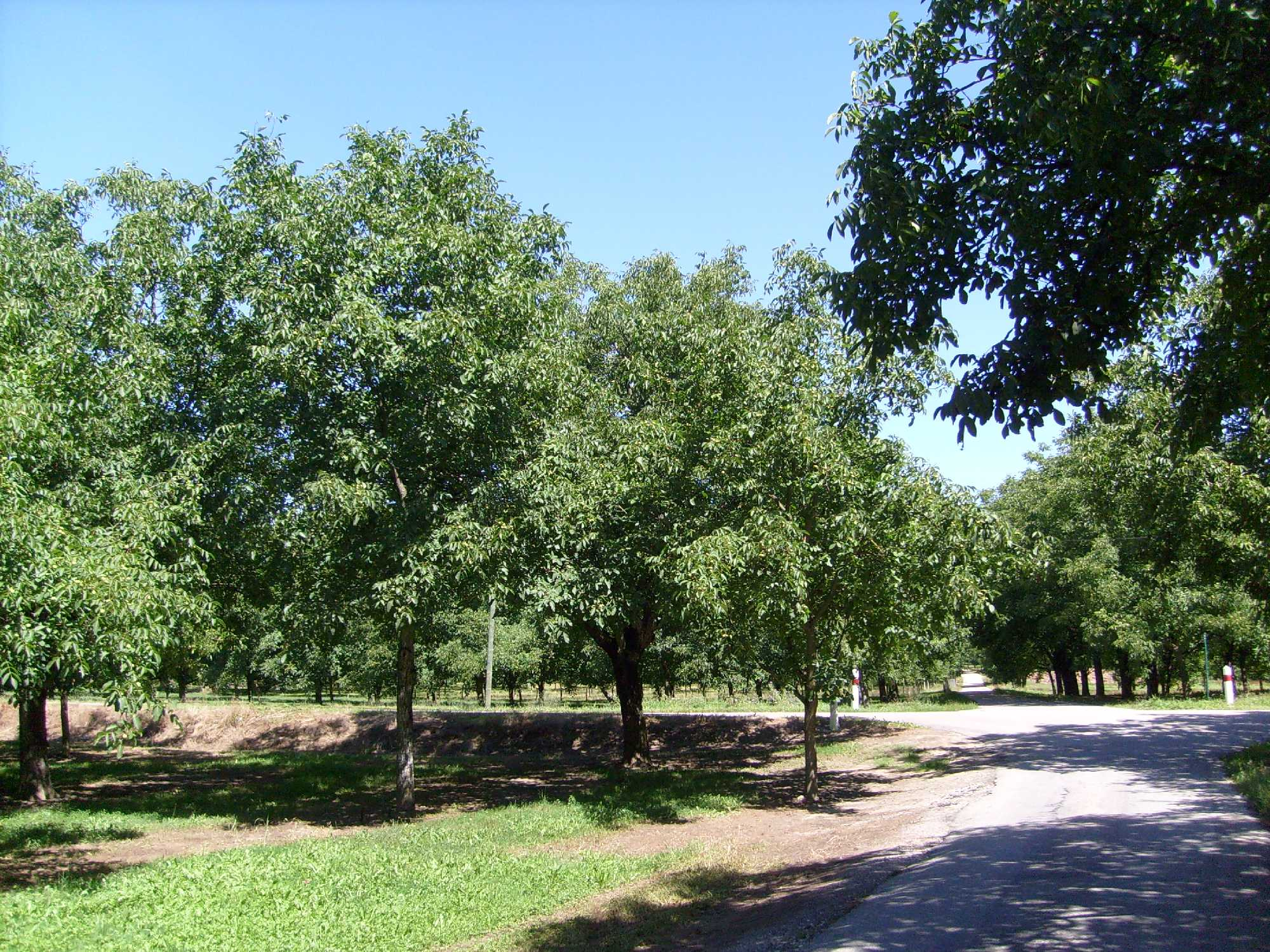
Walnut trees at L'Albenc

L'Ablenc has part of its territory classified and protected as a Site of Community Importance(ZNIEFF):

ZNIEFF type 1

"Dry Grass and rocks of Verdun" - this area covers the town of Albenc and Poliénas. This space is remarkable due to the presence of many protected and endangered orchid species. They were able to develop in soil covered with dried grass after the use of land by traditional single annual mowing or ranching.

ZNIEFF type 2

"Functional area of the Isère River downstream of Meylan" - this area includes all territories of l'Ablenc that border the Isere. Despite water quality undermined by pollution from various industries located along the lower reaches of the Isere, this area has a very rich fauna and flora. This is due to the different ecosystems that can be found along the river, sometimes consisting of wetlands and also dry balmes. In terms of wildlife, the main mammals that can be seen are the Southwestern water voles and European beavers. As for birds: the family of herons is well represented with many other birds living in the area such as the European bee-eater, the Eurasian penduline tit, etc. In addition, the classification of this area as ZNIEFF type 2 is to better preserve the environment and is part of a broader plan to restore the water quality conducted by the Director of Planning and water management for the Rhône-Mediterranean-Corsica basin.

== Notable people linked to the commune ==
- Jean Vinay (1907-1978), painter
- Jean Gabriel Marchand (10 December 1765 - 12 November 1851), French general of the armies of the Republic and of the Empire.

== See also ==
- Communes of the Isère department
