= Battle of Casal Novo =

1811 battle during the Peninsular War

- Part of Peninsular War
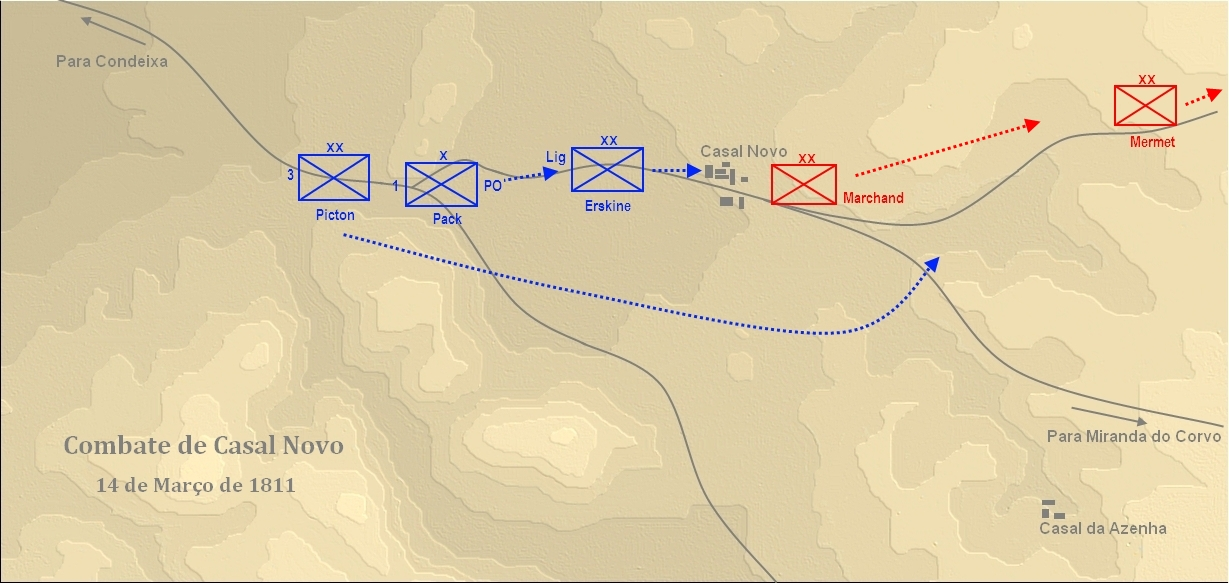
- Map with positions and movements
Date	14 March 1811
Location	Casal Novo, southeast of Coimbra, Portugal 40°12′N 8°25′W
Result	French victory (see § Aftermath)

Belligerents
France	United Kingdom; Portugal

Commanders and leaders
(First French Empire) Michel Ney (First French Empire) Jean Gabriel Marchand	(United Kingdom of Great Britain and Ireland) Sir William Erskine

Strength
4,600	7,000

Casualties and losses
at least 55	at least 155

Peninsular War
Third French invasion:
1 Siege of Astorga March April 1810
2 Siege of Ciudad Rodrigo April 1810
3 Siege of Almeida July 1810
3.1 Blockade of Almeida April 1811
4 Battle of Bussaco September 1810
5 Torres Vedras protects Lisbon
6 Battle of Redinha March 1811
7 Battle of Sabugal April 1811
8 Battle of Fuentes de Oñoro May 1811

The Battle of Casal Novo was a rear-guard action fought on March 14, 1811, during Massena's retreat from Portugal. During this retreat a French division, under command of Michel Ney, conducted a series of sharp rear-guard actions. At Casal Novo, the recklessness of Sir William Erskine resulted in costly losses in the Light Division.

== Background ==
Masséna's aims were to head north and force his way through the Mondego valley. His only obstacle was the Mondego River, but the French marshal found that all the bridges had been destroyed. In addition to this, he found the river impossible to ford, due to the city of Coimbra being occupied by Portuguese militia under Nicholas Trant.

In an attempt to delay Wellington's advance, Masséna put Michel Ney and his VI Corps in charge of the rear guard, where Ney proved remarkable tactical ability. He successfully checked the advance of the Anglo-Portuguese columns twice, at Pombal on March 11 and at Redinha on March 12. He then took up a new position at Condeixa, on the Mondego river.

However, the French were too slow to force their way across the Mondego river. Trant's militia held out, after a failed three-day attempt to secure Coimbra. In danger of being trapped, Massena changed his route. Instead of heading north, the French marshal decided to advance east, back into Spain. Ney was left at Condeixa in order to stall the allied army.

Wellington's vanguard caught up with the French at Condeixa. General Montbrun defended this position and delayed the allies long enough for the French to fall back eastwards towards Miranda de Corvo. With the position at Condeixa untenable, the town was abandoned and put to the torch. The next day, the allies advanced on the French positions around Miranda do Corvo. Sir William Erskine, in command of the British Light Division, attacked the French position at Casal Novo held by 4,600 men. He had 7,000 men available.

Ney had deployed his troops in strong positions. General Ferrey's men were stationed in the village of Casal Novo. Marchand's division was held back in a strong position on raised ground near Chão de Lamas.

== Battle ==
The Light Division advanced on Casal Novo, attacking through a fog which hid the French from sight. However, Erskine did not believe that the French were present, and did not even bother to scout the French position. The British were easy prey for Ferrey's men.

The Light Division was exposed to heavy fire for two to three hours, before eventually gaining a foothold in the town. The French fell back to Marchand's division and the Anglo-Portuguese, in pursuit, were cut down by Colonel Laferiere's 3rd Hussars. Despite this the Light Division surged forward, but met Marchand's division positioned on the heights in a strong defensive position. The French unleashed devastating fire on this body of troops. The Anglo-Portuguese were easily repulsed.

The arrival of the 3rd Division forced Ney to pull back Marchand's men before they were overwhelmed. Marchand pulled back and formed a line with the divisions of Mermet and of Loison on the heights of Miranda do Corvo.

== Aftermath ==
Ney delayed the Anglo-Portuguese long enough for many convoys to regain the head of the army. The Anglo-Portuguese suffered almost three times as many casualties as their French counterparts. Marchand's division had repulsed the attacks and the allies had once again failed to break through the French rear-guard.

Ney's rearguard withdrew across the river Ceira. A small body of troops were left on the other side at Foz de Arouce. From here, the stage was set for the combat of Foz de Arouce. This would be Ney's final battle in Portugal.

The Battle of Casal Novo was the first in a series of major bungles made by Erskine, the next being at Sabugal. Had the Light Division commander had the French positions scouted, the fiasco may have been avoided.

=== Casualties ===
Based on British historian Charles Oman, while the official French casualties of 55 killed and wounded may well be an underestimate, their losses were in any case much lower than the British, officially reported at 155.

Preceded by Battle of Redinha	Napoleonic Wars; Battle of Casal Novo	Succeeded by Battle of Campo Maior
