= Arunca River =

River in northern Portugal

Coordinates: 40°08′52″N 8°40′44″W

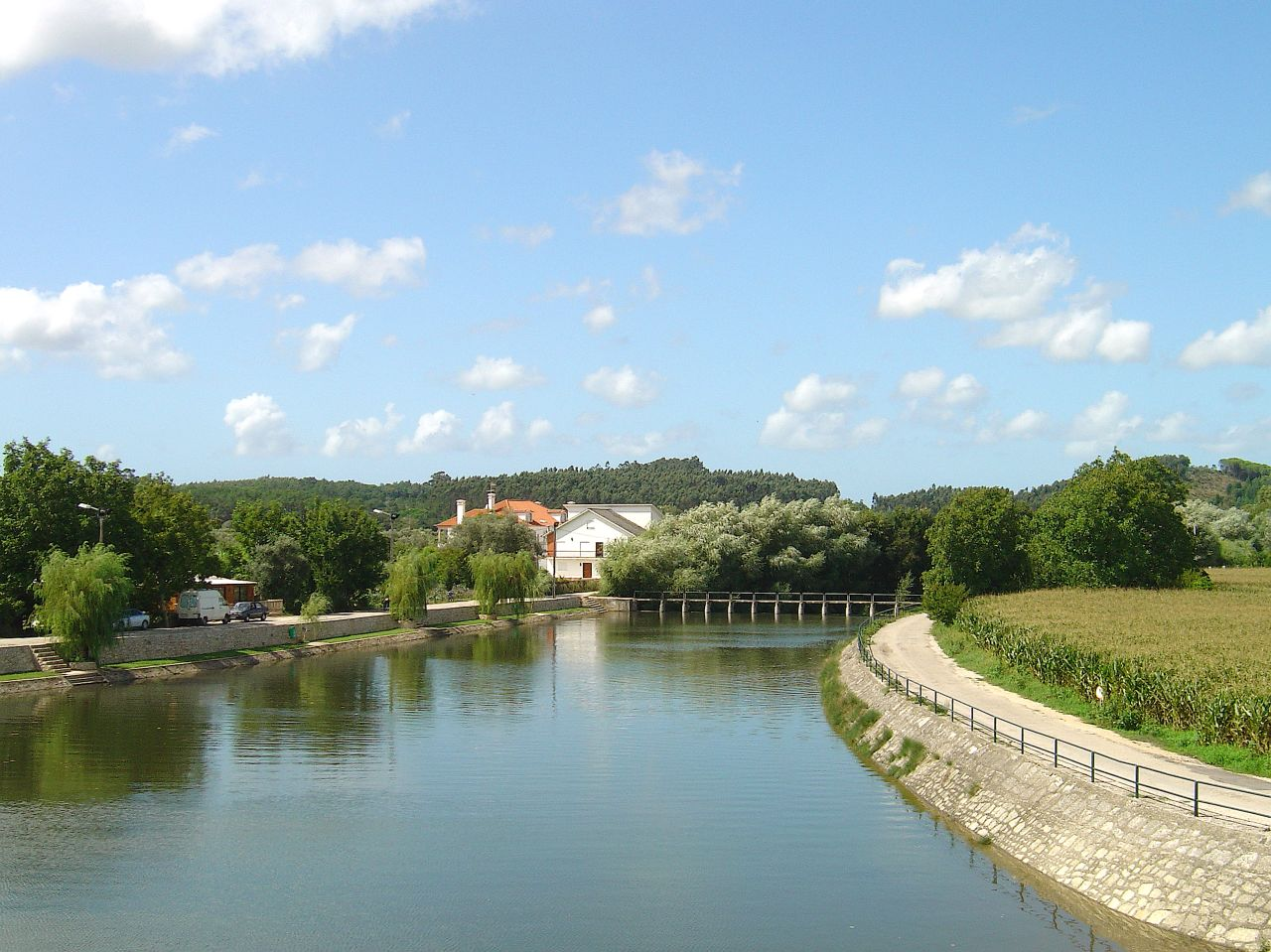
The Soure Dam on the Arunca River

Arunca River (Portuguese: Rio Arunca, Portuguese pronunciation: [ɐˈɾũkɐ]) is a river in Portugal. It is located in the municipalities of Soure and Montemor-o-Velho.
