= Battle of Redinha =

1811 battle during the Peninsular War

- Part of the Peninsular War
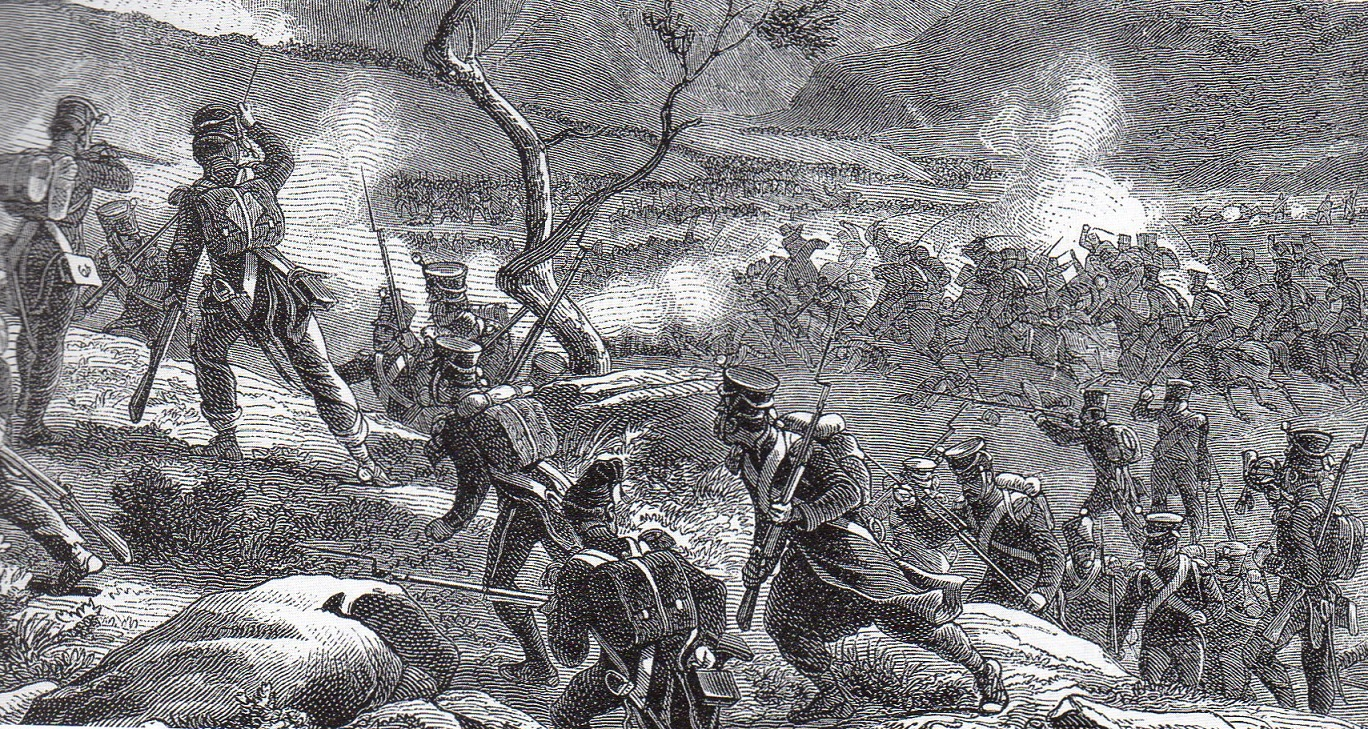
- Battle of Redinha, 12 March 1811, by Henri Félix Emmanuel Philippoteaux.
Date	12 March 1811
Location	River Soure, Portugal 40°03′N 8°38′W
Result	Inconclusive (Note: Ney successfully accomplished his task of delaying Wellington, thus giving Masséna time to escape without serious incident. The battle ended in Ney's tactical withdrawal, thus the result was indecisive.)

Belligerents
French Empire	United Kingdom; Portugal

Commanders and leaders
(First French Empire) Michel Ney	(United Kingdom of Great Britain and Ireland) Viscount Wellington

Strength
5,000–6,000 (Note: In total, Ney had 10,000 at his disposal.)	25,000–30,000 (at the end) (Note: In total, Wellington had 50,000 at his disposal.)

Casualties and losses
~200 to ~900 killed, wounded or missing (Note: Casualty estimates: • barely 200; • 227; • 229; • 200–300; • 190 killed and several hundred wounded; as the author states in his notes, between 1/5 and 3/5 were killed)	205 to 1,000+ killed, wounded or missing (Note: Casualty estimates: • 205; • 220 killed and several hundred wounded; • more than 1,000; an older authority – subject to criticism – states 1,800)

Peninsular war: Portugal
1807 1808 1809 1810 1811

The Battle of Redinha was a rearguard action which took place on March 12, 1811, during Masséna's retreat from Portugal as part of the Peninsular War, by a French division under Marshal Ney against a considerably larger Anglo-Portuguese force under Wellington. Challenging the Allies with only one or two divisions, Ney's 6,000 troops were pitched against 30,000 men. In a typical rearguard action, Ney delayed the Allied advance for a day and bought valuable time for the withdrawal of the main body of the French army.

Redinha was the second and most successful rearguard action for Ney fought during Masséna's retreat from the Lines of Torres Vedras in the spring of 1811. Having held off the British at Pombal on 11 March, Marshal Ney and the French rearguard had retreated to Redinha. Here he took up an apparently vulnerable position, with Mermet's division on a plateau south of the village, and Marchand's division north of the village on the far side of the Ancos River, linked by a narrow bridge, but Wellington was aware that he was close to much larger French formations, and proceeded very carefully.

== Background ==
By February 1810 Masséna, stalled for six months at the Lines of Torres Vedras, his men famished and demoralized, accepted the advice of his despondent lieutenants and began preparations to extricate the French army from Portugal. With his customary sang-froid Masséna drafted orders calling for the army to quit the Tagus abruptly between 4 and 6 March, aiming to secure Coimbra as a base from which to throw bridges over the Mondego River and afford the army a passage to safety. The French pursued a retrograde movement along the Mondego valley—which Masséna had long contemplated, were it not for Napoleon's express orders forbidding him to budge from the Tagus—hoping for better foraging country as they exhausted their last reserves of biscuit.

It is certainly astonishing that the enemy have been able to remain in this country so long; and it is an extraordinary instance of what a French army can do. ...They brought no provisions with them, and they have not received even a letter since they entered Portugal. With all our money, and having in our favour the good inclinations of the country, I assure you that I could not maintain one division in the district in which they have maintained not less than 60,000 men...for more than two months.

— Arthur Wellesley

Aware that his preliminary measures of channelling wounded or ill men, heavy guns, and large wagons, would alert the British and Portuguese to his intentions, Masséna took measures to forestall an Allied attempt against his lines. In the Tagus valley where the French were established in depth, a handful of bayonets would suffice to keep Wellington at bay, but along the coastal roads, rapid movements might allow the enemy to seize Leiria, Pombal, or Condeixa, cutting the French line of retreat and forcing Masséna south into the Zêzere valley, an inhospitable and dangerous region. By March 5, every corps in the French army was in motion: a concentration at Punhete under Loison masked the broader movements, Loison feinting an attempt to force the Tagus. Marshal Ney raced from Tomar towards the heights of Leiria with two divisions (Mermet and Marchand) and a cavalry brigade (Montbrun), adding Conroux's division on the march and putting some 22,000 men on the approach to the sea. Meanwhile, Reynier moved from Santarém to Tomar, descending the heights at Miranda do Corvo and establishing himself on the left bank of the Mondego. Junot would march to Torres Novas, passing Ney, crossing Pombal, and racing on to Coimbra. Loison, after destroying the decoy bridges at Punhete March 7, joined Ney at Leiria, forming Masséna's rearguard.

=== Wellington moves ===
The Allies stood still between March 4 and 6, tracking the French manoeuvres and trying to discern Masséna's intentions with certainty. To Wellington the apparent French retreat was itself a welcome relief, and the general opted to wait out events rather than risk compromising his advantage with precipitate actions against the enemy (nor was Wellington eager to try conclusions with a commander as reputed as Masséna, even an apparently beaten Masséna, unless it were on his own terms). Unbeknownst to the French, however, several Allied detachments (largely Portuguese recruits) had already seized many positions along the Mondego. Consequently, the Allies did not march until the morning of the 6th, with Wellington directing a circumspect and cautious pursuit of Ney.

French parties under Montbrun reconnoitred the Mondego the morning of March 11 but found the river, in full flood, impossible to ford, and Coimbra occupied by Portuguese militia under Nicholas Trant. The next day, a location was discovered at Pereira, eight miles upstream, where the river might be passed by a set of bridges, providing some 36 hours could be gained for their construction.

=== Pombal ===
Wellington's first check came at the village of Pombal, which Ney initially yielded to the approaching Allied columns without a fight the morning of March 11. As the British filed into the village, Ney ordered an abrupt about-face and counterattacked with three battalions, brusquely pushing the enemy from the town and throwing the British columns into disorder, with some troops being driven into the river and drowned. The French battalions then put Pombal to the torch, stalling the Allied pursuit and buying Masséna the crucial hours needed to occupy Coimbra—though, as it turned out, the opportunity was missed.

== Battle ==
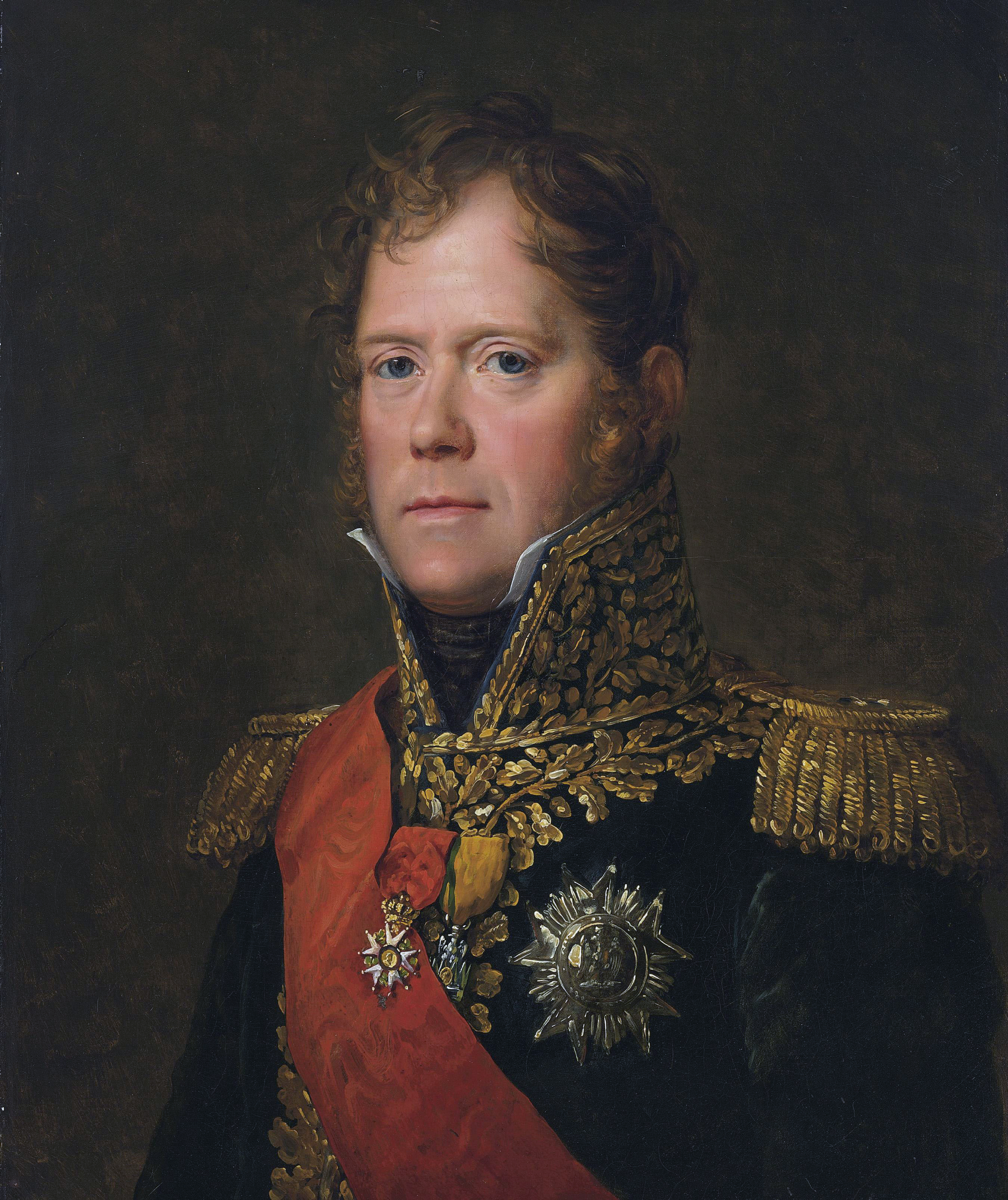
Michel Ney, Marshal of France

=== Initial movements ===
Ney deployed Mermet's rearguard division in line on a plateau some 3 km (1.9 mi) south of Redinha, bolstering this contingent with the 3rd Hussars, a few dragoon squadrons, as well as 8 guns for support. A second division under Marchand was stationed further North across the Ancos river, on the main road to Coimbra by the village of Redinha. Wellington advanced with caution, as his army arrived piecemeal on the scene and he was uncertain of the strength of the French force in front. His three forward-most divisions made contact but halted and deployed in line to face Mermet's contingent: the Light Division under Erskine on the western flank, Pack's Portuguese brigade in the center and Picton's 3rd Division on the east. Once Cole's 4th Division arrived to enforce Pack's brigade, with the 1st and 6th Divisions closing fast, it was clear that the Anglo-Portuguese had a significant advantage in numbers and so began their attack, at approximately 2pm.

=== Combat of Redinha ===
Wellington threw the 3rd and Light Division forward on the flanks to envelop Mermet's position, while the center advanced slowly and took some casualties from the French artillery. The fighting became intense in the center while sharp skirmishing took place on the flanks, especially in the forest on the French right. However both French flanks were eventually turned. To avoid it becoming overwhelmed, Ney promptly withdrew Mermet's line in echelon to its second pre-established position across the Ancos river in Redinha, where Marchand's division was waiting in support. During the river crossing the French infantry became bottle-necked on the bridge and suffered significantly from close range fire by skirmishers from the British Light Division.

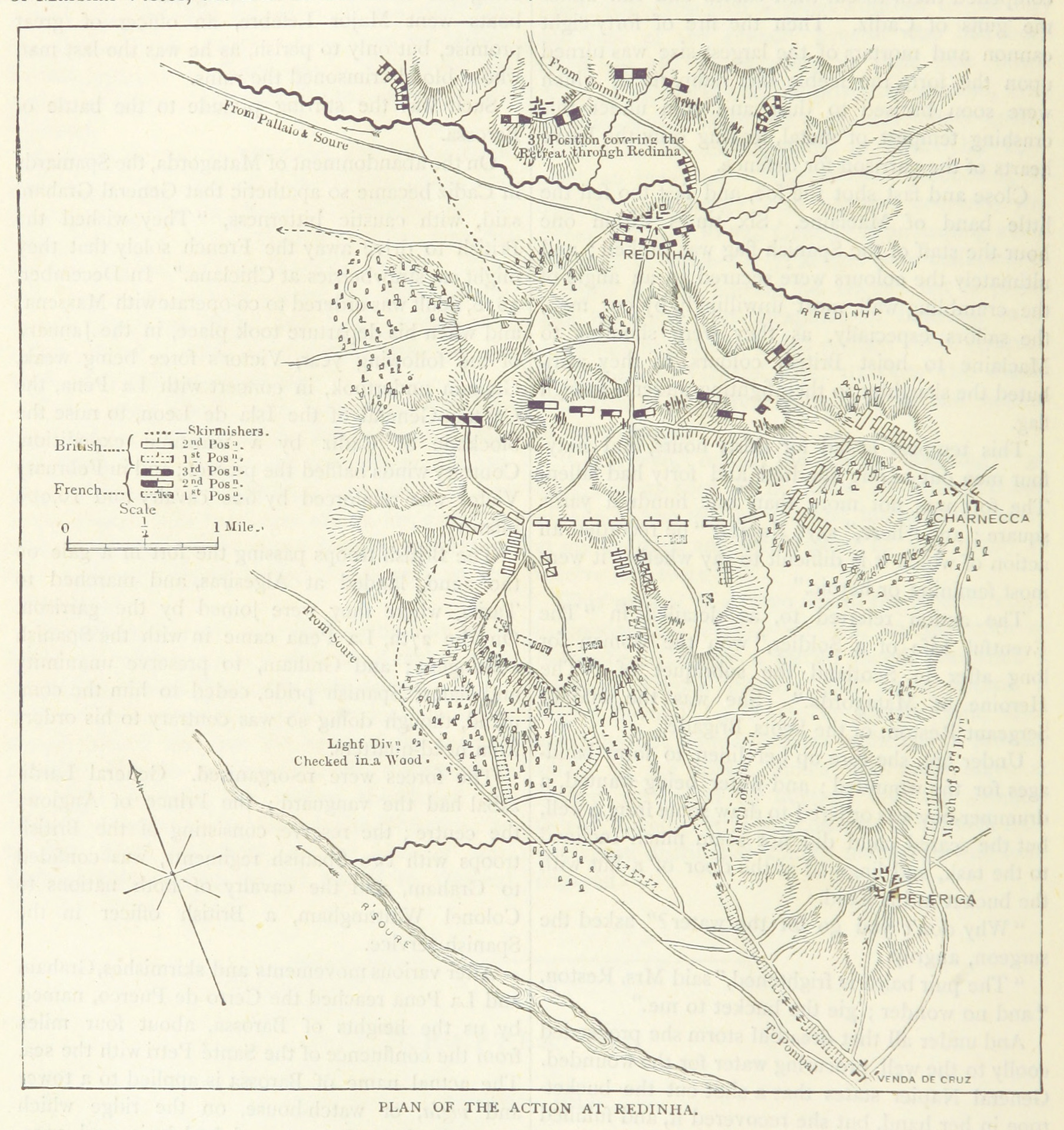
A map of the battle

The Anglo-Portuguese troops took some time to follow and deploy on the other side of the river, before starting another attack in the same style, with the 3rd and Light Divisions on the flanks while Cole's 4th Division formed up alongside Pack's Portuguese once again for a central push. As before, Ney waited until the last moment before retiring once more as evening was falling. The allied vanguard pursued for a while when Ney abruptly turned two battalions to pour a heavy fire on the Anglo-Portuguese, before finally retiring in good order to the village of Condeixa.

== Aftermath ==
Ney's two stands were successful in delaying the allies for an entire day, Wellington only managing to advance ten miles in twenty four hours. Wellington's next clash with Ney's rearguard occurred the following day, March 13, at Condeixa. This time Picton's Division maneuvered to attempt cutting off Ney's contingent from the main body of the army, thus forcing him to quickly retire without much resistance. The British historian Charles Oman places the French losses at Redinha at 14 officers and 213 men, all from Mermet's division, whereas the allied losses were 12 officers and 193 men, mostly from the 3rd and the Light Division. Other sources like the French statesman and historian Adolphe Thiers quotes a much more sizeable number of losses for the British numbering around 1,800 men compared to scarcely 200 men for the French.

Wellington's contemporaries, both French and British, criticized his handling of the battle. An unlikely dissenter was the Baron de Marbot who, as an eyewitness, deemed the battle of no consequence and deplored the false pride of two generals which cost so many brave men their lives with no result. In fact Wellington was aware that he was advancing on Ney's VI Corps, that another French column was on his flank (Loison's division at Rabaçal, around 8 km (5.0 mi) east) and that VIII Corps was not far off as stragglers from it had been picked up earlier that morning. He therefore proceeded cautiously, unwilling to risk a hasty and potentially costly engagement by not being fully aware of the French dispositions. Historian John Fortescue likewise defended Wellington, contending that:

It is by no means certain that Wellington showed undue caution. [...] His army was still England's only army; and it could have served no purpose to lose a number of men in a partial engagement when the same result could be attained by a few hours' delay. The country was an ideal one for rearguard actions; Massena's though a retreating was not a beaten army, and most of his generals were tacticians of skill and experience.

Ney has been praised for his remarkable handling of the rearguard. The conduct of Ney's retreat drew much praise from several British commanders, including Sir Thomas Picton, who thought Ney handled the business well. "At Redinha Ney again turned, using Mermet and Marchand in another skillful rearguard action, ...causing further delays to Wellington." For the loss of 229 men he had held Wellington up for an entire day, giving Masséna the time he needed to force his way across the Mondego River. "Ney had achieved his objectives, he had protected the rear of the army, his own corps rearguard had been safely withdrawn and Wellington had been delayed by a day.".

Unfortunately for the French, Masséna failed to take advantage of the respite. Crucially, in the time bought by Ney, Masséna had not attempted a coup de main against Coimbra, even though Trant's rather weak garrison had orders to retire immediately if strongly pressed. At the end of 12 March the French were still to the south of the river, and in danger of being trapped by Wellington. The only alternative route open to Masséna was to retreat east towards the Spanish border, and the only road available led east from Condeixa. With the British close to that village, on the morning of 13 March Masséna began the long costly retreat back into Spain which marked the complete failure of his great invasion of Portugal.

The next action would be at Condeixa the following day, followed by the battles of Casal Novo and finally, Foz de Arouce.

== Sources ==
- Chartrand, René (2002). Fuentes de Oñoro: Wellington's Liberation of Portugal. Osprey Publishing. ISBN 978-1-84176-311-8.
- Fletcher, Ian (2003). The Lines of Torres Vedras 1809–11. Osprey Publishing. ISBN 978-1-84176-576-1.
- Fortescue, John (1917). A History of the British Army. Vol. VIII. Macmillan Publishers (published 2008).
- Gates, David (1986). The Spanish Ulcer: A History of the Peninsular War. Da Capo Press. ISBN 0-306-81083-2.
- Marbot, Jean-Baptiste Antoine Marcellin (2005) [1891]. The Memoirs of Baron De Marbot. Kessinger Publishing. ISBN 978-1-4179-0855-4.
- Thiers, Adolphe (1884). Histoire du consulat et de l'empire: faisant suite a l'Histoire de la révolution française. Vol. XII. Furne & Jovet.
- Willoughby, William; Verner, Cole (1919). History & Campaigns of the Rifle Brigade Part 2. J. Bale, Sons & Danielsson.
- Oman, Charles (1911). A History of the Peninsular War Volume IV. Oxford University Press.
- Castex, Jean-Claude (2013). Combats franco-anglais des guerres du premier empire. Editions P.O.

Preceded by Battle of Pombal	Napoleonic Wars; Battle of Redinha	Succeeded by Battle of Casal Novo
