= Battle of Pombal =

1811 battle during the Peninsular War

- Part of the Peninsular War
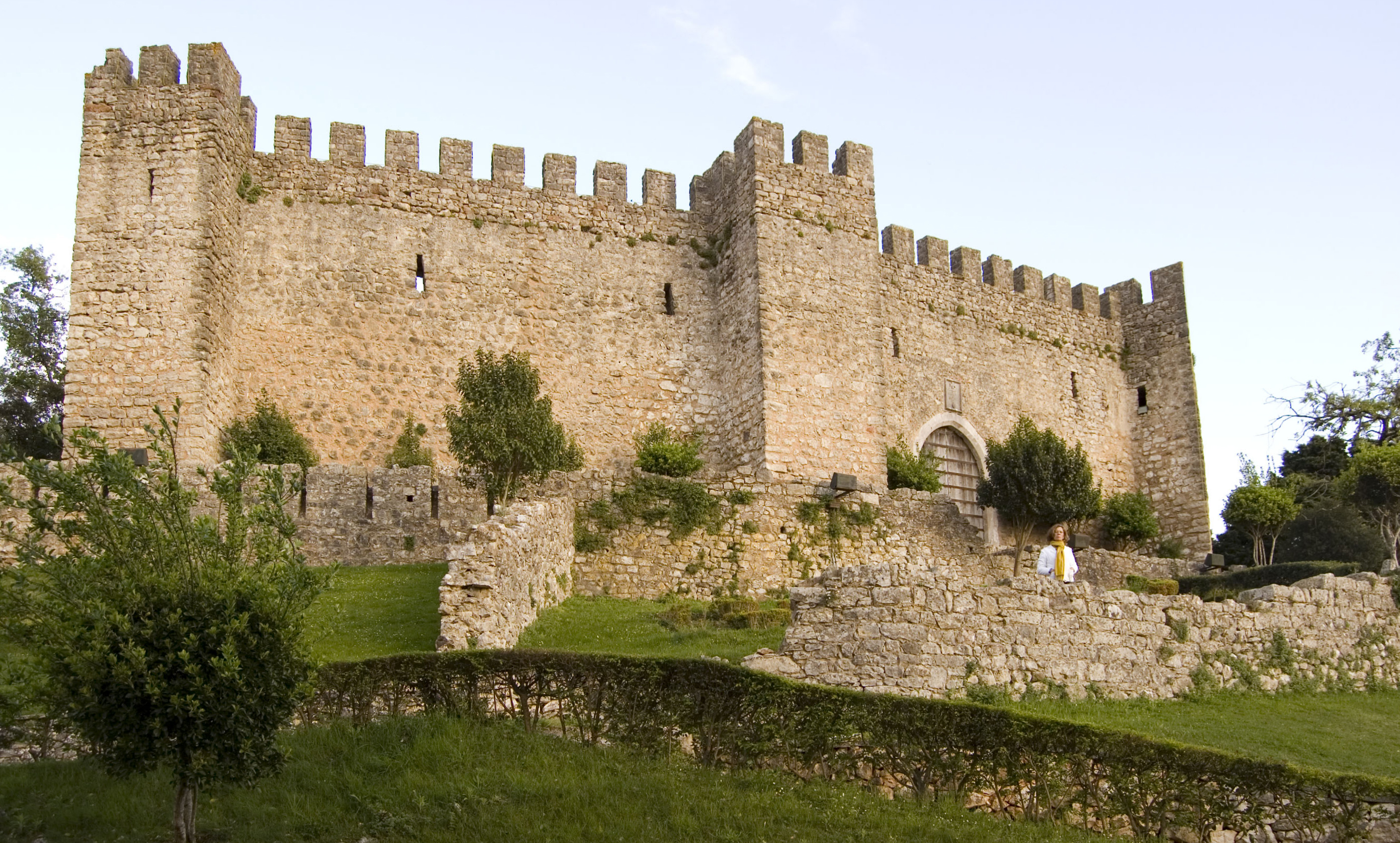
Date	9–11 March 1811
Location	Pombal, Portugal 39°55′N 8°37′W
Result	Inconclusive

Belligerents
French Empire	United Kingdom; Portugal

Commanders and leaders
(First French Empire) Michel Ney	(United Kingdom of Great Britain and Ireland) Viscount Wellington (Kingdom of Portugal) Luís do Rego

Strength
9,340 (Note: In total, Ney had around 15,000. It is also reported that on the 11th he engaged only about 1,000 men.)	16,000 (Note: In total, Wellington had around 30,000. Another source states that Wellington had a total of 43,000 (out of 46,000) to confront Masséna's main force.)

Casualties and losses
63 casualties (British estimate)	37 casualties (British estimate)
- or "heavy" casualties on both sides (French estimate)

Peninsular War
Third French invasion:
1 Siege of Astorga March April 1810
2 Siege of Ciudad Rodrigo April 1810
3 Siege of Almeida July 1810
3.1 Blockade of Almeida April 1811
4 Battle of Bussaco September 1810
5 Torres Vedras protects Lisbon
6 Battle of Redinha March 1811
7 Battle of Sabugal April 1811
8 Battle of Fuentes de Oñoro May 1811

The Battle of Pombal (March 9 to 11, 1811) was a sharp but ultimately indecisive skirmish fought at the eponymous town during Marshal Masséna's retreat from the Lines of Torres Vedras, the first in a series of lauded rearguard actions fought by Michel Ney. The French were pursued by Wellington and his British-Portuguese army but the Allied advance was energetically contested by Ney's efforts, preventing Wellington from crushing Masséna's army when it was critically vulnerable.

At Pombal, Ney turned part of his rearguard to face the larger Anglo-Portuguese forces and checked their advance, before he faced new attacks and chose to disengage to rejoin the main body of Masséna's army. Both British and French sources note Ney's skilful leadership of his rearguard; they report on the engagements that happened on the 9th, 10th and 11th. However, the descriptions of actions differ to some extent.

== Background ==
Unable to break the Lines of Torres Vedras, Ney was given charge of the rear-guard while the main body of the French army withdrew from Portugal. The rear-guard consisted of Mermet's and Marchand's divisions.

Marshal Ney deceived the British, maneuvering his troops so that Wellington believed that the French were about to return to Torres Vedras, and thus he suspended an offensive operation for several hours, giving Masséna a huge running start.

When it became clear to Wellington that he had been deceived, the British-Portuguese left Torres Vedras and began a pursuit. The British-Portuguese caught up with Ney at the town of Pombal.

== Battle ==
Informed of the approaching British columns, Ney withdrew Marchand's troops but left Mermet's division deployed nearby on the heights beyond Pombal, with a single battalion left behind in the town's castle. Wellington ordered George Elder's battalion of the 3rd Portuguese Caçadores and 2 companies of 95th Rifles to charge across the bridge and occupy the town, with the rest of the Light Division to which they belonged gradually coming up behind in support.

As the Allied vanguard was clearing the entrance to the town in a heated struggle, Ney realized his troops risked being overwhelmed and quickly came down the heights with 4 battalions of the 6th Light and 69th line infantry, driving the Caçadores and Rifle companies back across the Arunca River. Ney is reported to have addressed the 6th Light: "Chasseurs, you are losing your beautiful reputation, and you will dishonor yourselves forever if you do not drive the enemy out of Pombal. Come on! Those who are brave, with me!"

The Light Division commanded by William Erskine hurried forward to support its van, followed by the 3rd and 4th Divisions, and gradually began to engage the French. Ney ordered the main road through Pombal to be barricaded, put the town to the torch and then withdrew his men. This caused the Allied columns the rest of the day to clear through, while the French then retired without further incident.

== Aftermath ==
Despite his initial success, Ney promptly set fire to the town of Pombal and continued his retreat on the right bank of the Arunca. The next action would be the Battle of Redinha.

British general Sir Thomas Picton was impressed by Ney's actions, as the former was able to observe the latter's deceiving movements, claiming that it was a "perfect lesson in the art of war".

== See also ==
- Timeline of the Peninsular War

== Notes ==
Preceded by Battle of Barrosa	Napoleonic Wars; Battle of Pombal	Succeeded by Battle of Redinha
