= Siege of Ciudad Rodrigo (1812) =

1812 siege during the Peninsular War

- Part of the Peninsular War
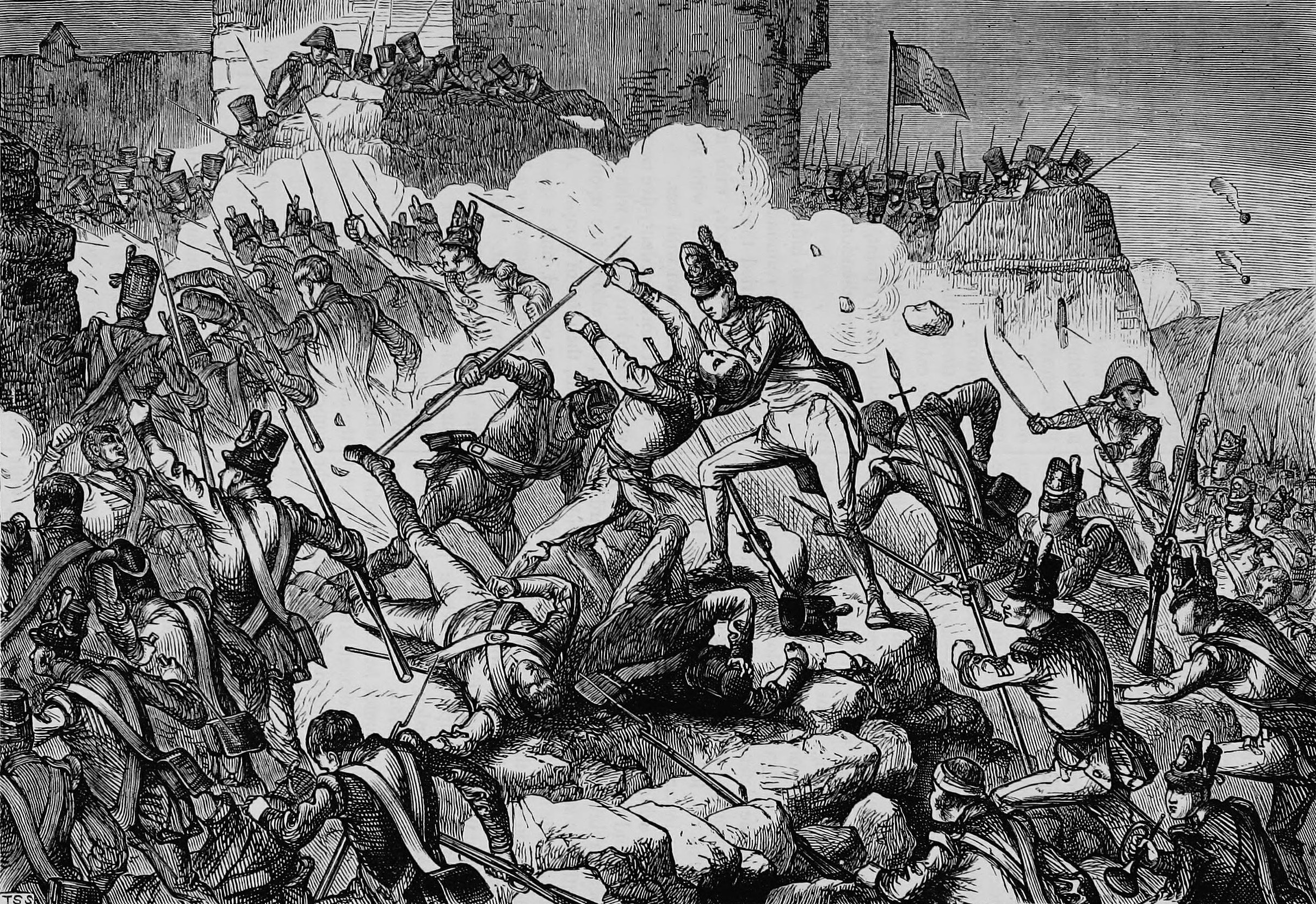
- British infantry storm the fortress at Ciudad Rodrigo during Wellington's campaign in Spain
Date	7–20 January 1812
Location	Ciudad Rodrigo, Spain 40°35′49″N 6°32′21″W
Result	Coalition victory

Belligerents
(First French Empire) French Empire	(United Kingdom of Great Britain and Ireland) United Kingdom; Portugal

Commanders and leaders
(First French Empire) Jean Léonard Barrié	(United Kingdom of Great Britain and Ireland) Arthur Wellesley; Luís do Rego; Thomas Graham

Strength
1,800–2,000; 153 guns	26,000 (besieging force); 36 guns

Casualties and losses
529–800 killed or wounded 1,000–1,471 captured	250–318 killed 1,100–1,378 wounded

Peninsular War: Spain
current battle
Wellington in command
Wellington not in command

The siege of Ciudad Rodrigo was the successful investment of the French-occupied city of Ciudad Rodrigo by Lord Wellington's Anglo-Portuguese Army from 7–20 January 1812. Wellington's army, which numbered up to 40,000 men, faced a small French garrison of 1,800 troops under the command of Jean Léonard Barrié. After two breaches were blasted in the city's walls by heavy artillery units of the Royal Artillery, the successful storming of Ciudad Rodrigo was conducted by British troops on the evening of 19 January. After overcoming the French defenders, the attacking troops went on a rampage for several hours before order was restored. The Anglo-Portuguese Army suffered casualties of about 1,700 men, including two generals killed. Strategically, the fall of the city opened the northern gateway into French-occupied Spain from Portugal.

== Background ==
The allied campaign in Spain started with the siege of Ciudad Rodrigo.

== Preliminary operations ==
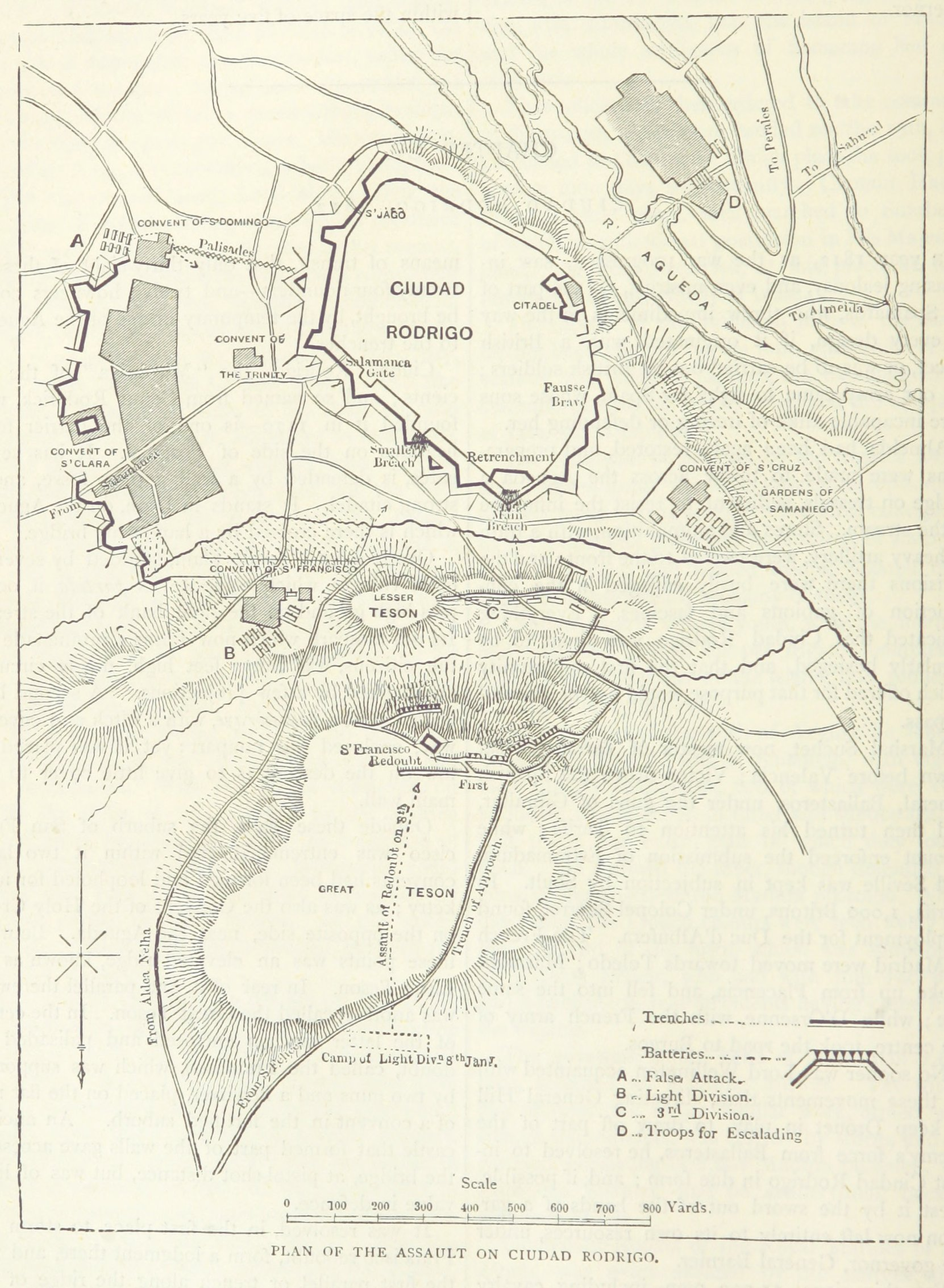
A map of the siege

As part of his strategy in Spain, Napoleon ordered Marshal Auguste Marmont to send 10,000 troops to help Marshal Louis Suchet's forces capture Valencia and 4,000 more to reinforce the central reserve. When Wellington received news that Marmont's Army of Portugal sent forces eastward, he moved in bad snowstorm conditions, on Ciudad Rodrigo and arrived in the area on 6 January, with Wellington surveying the approaches with the chief engineer Lt. Col. Fletcher CRE next morning.

Ciudad Rodrigo was a second class fortress with a 32-foot (9.8 m) high main wall built of "bad masonry, without flanks, and with weak parapets and narrow ramparts." The city being dominated by the 600-foot (180 m) high Grand Teson hill to the north, the French built a redoubt there. Barrié's 2,000-man garrison was far too weak to properly man the defences. The French garrison included single battalions of the 34th Light and 113th Line Infantry Regiments, a platoon of sappers and only 167 artillerists to man 153 cannons.

The fortress was invested, and on the night of 8 January, the Light Division stormed and took the Grand Teson redoubt by surprise. and began digging trenches to, and positions for, the breaching batteries. Digging in the rocky soil at night caused a peculiar hazard. When a pickaxe struck a stone, the resulting spark drew accurate French fire. By 12 January the trenches to battery positions were complete and the batteries were being installed. Wellington received a message concerning Marshal Marmont's movements and decided the siege must be undertaken rapidly. The Santa Cruz Convent, to the right, was stormed on 13 January by the King's German Legion and one company of the 60th. The defenders made a vigorous sortie at 11 am on 14 January with 500 men, as the troops were being relieved, this sortie was repulsed, and that night an escalade was mounted against the San Francisco Convent, on the left, by men from the 40th Regiment of Foot which was successful, all French troops falling back inside the city walls. The batteries, which opened fire at 4pm on 14 January, included thirty-four 24-pound and four 18-pound siege cannon. Work began on the second parallel, to provide closer batteries and a safe covered route for assaulting troops. In five days, the guns fired over 9,500 rounds and opened two effective breaches, one, called the great breach in a wall and a smaller one in an exposed tower. Wellington ordered an assault for the night of 19 January.

== The storm ==
Major-General Thomas Picton's 3rd Division was ordered to storm the greater breach on the northwest while Robert Craufurd's Light Division was sent against the lesser breach on the north. Diversionary attacks by Denis Pack's Portuguese brigade would probe the defences at the San Pelayo Gate on the east and across the Agueda River on the south. All told, Wellington planned to use 10,700 men in his assault.

Launched at 7 pm, the assault met determined resistance in the great breach. The men assaulting the small breach had fewer problems and managed to get through the wall and behind the defenders of the great breach, making further resistance hopeless, the assault was completely successful. There had been two cannons embedded in the wall of the greater breach that caused most casualties in the storming. The 88th Connaught Rangers Regiment took one of the guns while the 45th Nottinghamshire Regiment took the other. Allied losses in the assault were 195 killed and 916 wounded, but among the dead were Major-Generals Henry MacKinnon and Robert Craufurd. The victory was somewhat marred when the British rank and file, who were upset by the 562 casualties suffered during the storming of the town, thoroughly sacked the city, despite the efforts of their officers to rein them in, which they eventually managed to do.

== Strategic consequences ==
The French garrison lost 529 killed and wounded, while the rest were captured. The French Army of Portugal lost its entire siege train among the 153 captured cannon. The rapid loss of Ciudad Rodrigo badly upset the calculations of Marmont who believed that the city would hold for three weeks, which would give him enough time to concentrate a relief force at Salamanca. It fell in less than two weeks and Marmont, with his 32,000 troops, decided not to try to recapture it as he needed the troops to defend other towns and fortresses.

Wellington received an earldom and a generous pension from the British. The Spanish made him Duque de Ciudad Rodrigo.

The capture of Ciudad Rodrigo opened up the possibility of a northern invasion corridor from Portugal into Spain. It also allowed Wellington to proceed to Badajoz on the southern corridor, whose taking would be a much more bloody affair.

== Aftermath ==
The allied campaign in Spain proceeded with the siege of Badajoz.

The victorious Arthur Wellesley was named the Duke of Ciudad Rodrigo.

== Notes ==
Preceded by Siege of Valencia (1812)	Napoleonic Wars; Siege of Ciudad Rodrigo (1812)	Succeeded by Siege of Badajoz (1812)
