= Second siege of Badajoz (1811) =

1811 siege of the Peninsular War

- Part of the Peninsular War
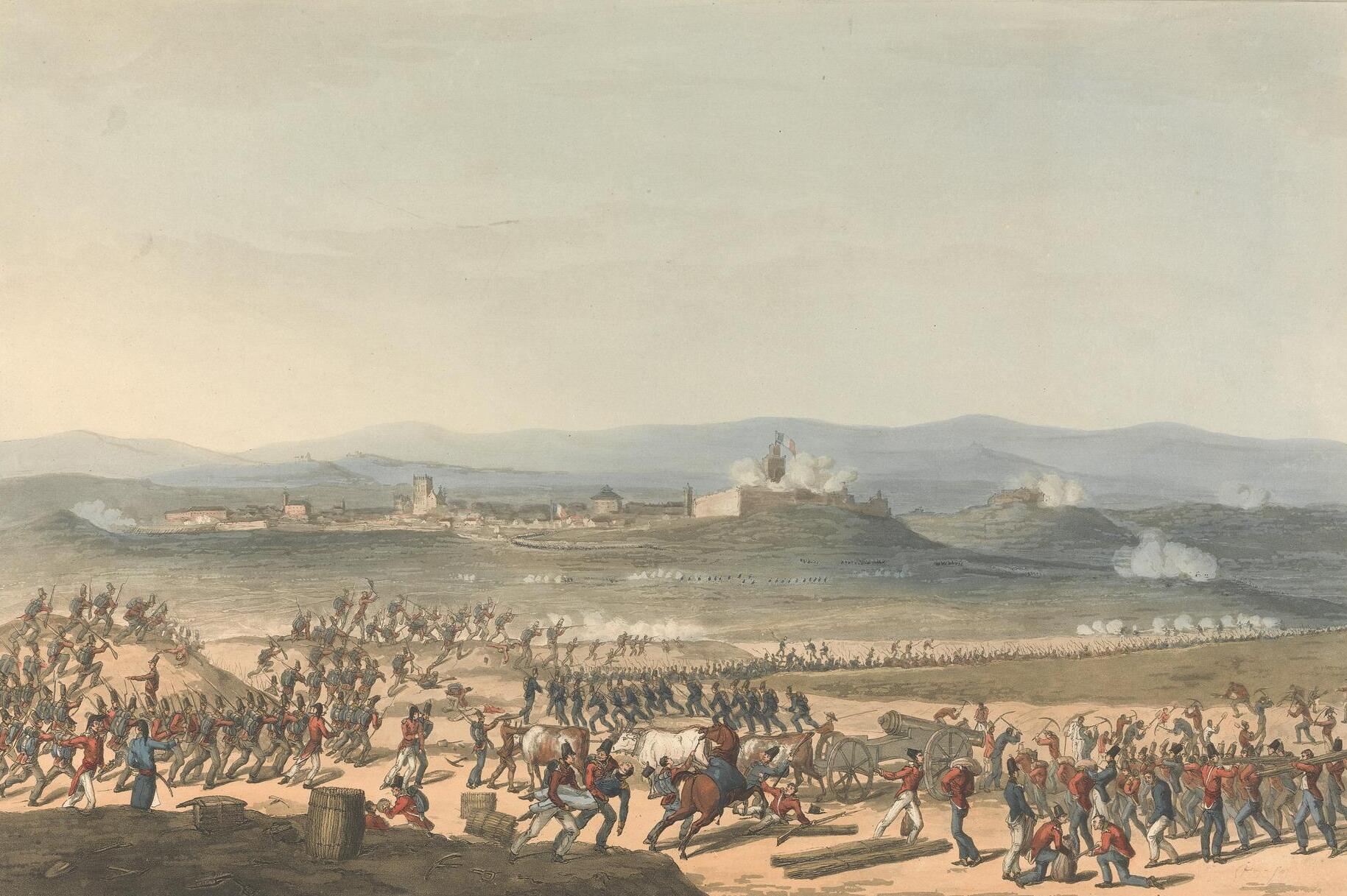
- Badajos during the Siege of June 1811; Charles Turner, 1811
Date	22 April – 12 May 1811; 19 May – 10 June 1811
Location	Badajoz, Spain 38°53′N 6°58′W
Result	French victory

Belligerents
(First French Empire) French Empire	(United Kingdom of Great Britain and Ireland) United Kingdom; Portugal

Commanders and leaders
(First French Empire) Armand Philippon	(United Kingdom of Great Britain and Ireland) Arthur Wellesley; (United Kingdom of Great Britain and Ireland) William Beresford

Strength
7,600	34,700

Casualties and losses
Unknown	964 killed, wounded or captured

Peninsular War
Castile 1811–13
current battle

The second siege of Badajoz (22 April – 12 May and 18 May – 10 June, 1811) saw an Anglo-Portuguese Army, first led by William Carr Beresford and later commanded by Arthur Wellesley, the Viscount Wellington, besiege a French garrison under Armand Philippon at Badajoz, Spain. After failing to force a surrender, Wellington withdrew his army when the French mounted a successful relief effort by combining the armies of Marshals Nicolas Soult and Auguste Marmont. The action was fought during the Peninsular War, part of the Napoleonic Wars. Badajoz is located 6 kilometres (4 mi) from the Portuguese border on the Guadiana River in western Spain.

While Wellington faced Marshal André Masséna's Army of Portugal in the north, his lieutenant Beresford attempted to capture French-held Badajoz in the south. Beresford invested the city in April but Philippon's garrison successfully fended off his attacks. The siege was briefly lifted while the Battle of Albuera was fought on 16 May. Though both sides suffered horrific casualties, Beresford emerged the victor and Soult retreated to the east. Wellington brought reinforcements from the north and resumed the siege, but progress was slow in the face of spirited French resistance. Meanwhile, Masséna's replacement Marmont brought large forces south to join Soult. The British commander lifted the siege after being menaced by the numerically superior French army led by Soult and Marmont.

== Background ==
Hoping to assist Marshal André Masséna's third French invasion of Portugal, Emperor Napoleon ordered Marshal Nicolas Soult to act. Accordingly, Soult set out in January 1811 with 13,500 foot soldiers, 4,000 horse, and 2,000 gunners and sappers to besiege Badajoz. In a preliminary operation, Soult captured Olivenza in a two-week siege that ended on 23 January. The French seized 4,161 Spanish prisoners and 18 guns for an admitted loss of only 15 killed and 40 wounded. On 27 January, Soult's army invested Badajoz. Despite the interference of a 15,000-man Spanish relief army, the results were all the French could have hoped for. On 19 February, Soult sent Marshal Édouard Mortier to deal with the Spanish army. Mortier won a crushing victory in the Battle of the Gebora. The Spanish lost 850 killed and wounded plus 4,000 men, 17 guns, and 6 colors captured. French casualties only numbered 403. Turning to the siege, Soult forced a surrender on 11 March. The 4,340-man Spanish garrison plus 2,000 fugitives from the Battle of the Gebora lost about 1,000 killed and wounded while the rest became prisoners. The French sustained 1,900 casualties in the siege.

At about this time Soult received intelligence that Spanish General Francisco Ballesteros was menacing Seville and Marshal Claude Perrin Victor had been defeated by General Thomas Graham at the Battle of Barrosa. Leaving Mortier and 11,000 soldiers to hold Badajoz and environs, Soult hurried away with the remainder to deal with the twin threats. Meanwhile, Mortier besieged and captured Campo Maior on 21 March. As his subordinate General of Division Victor de Fay de Latour-Maubourg convoyed the captured cannon back to Badajoz, he was surprised by the cavalry vanguard of William Carr Beresford's approaching Anglo-Portuguese corps. In the Battle of Campo Maior on 25 March, the British 13th Light Dragoons scored an initial success, then lost all control as they galloped after the defeated French dragoons. In the confusion, Latour-Maubourg kept his head and, with the help of Mortier, managed to save the artillery convoy except for one artillery piece. Nevertheless, the appearance of Beresford and 18,000 Allied troops threw the French onto the defensive.

A field marshal in the service of Portugal, Beresford had available the 2nd Division, the 4th Division, Major General John Hamilton's Portuguese Division, and General Robert Ballard Long's cavalry. If he could have invested Badajoz at the end of March, Beresford might have found the defenses of the fortress in poor shape. However, problems arose to delay the operation until the French effected repairs. First, the 4th Division was immobilized by a lack of shoes and had to wait for a new shipment from Lisbon. Next, ample bridging material was supposed to be available at the Portuguese fortress of Elvas, but the number of pontoons proved inadequate to span the Guadiana River. The military engineers improvised a bridge, but it was immediately washed out by a flood on 4 April. A battalion was ferried across on the 5th, and starting on 6 April, the Allied corps began slowly filing across the Guadiana on a rickety structure. Luckily, for the Allies, the French did not contest the crossing. Mortier had been recalled and his replacement Latour-Maubourg lacked his strategic insight.

Too late, Latour-Maubourg finally woke up and sent two cavalry regiments and four infantry battalions on a reconnaissance to find out what was afoot. On the night of the 6th, the French flying column gobbled up a picket of the 13th Light Dragoons. The British lost 52 horsemen captured in this misadventure. General of Brigade Michel Veilande reported that the Allies were across the Guadiana in great strength. Before withdrawing from the area, Latour-Maubourg left General of Brigade Armand Philippon with 3,000 men in Badajoz and 400 soldiers in Olivenza (Olivença). Unaware that Olivenza had such a weak garrison, the Allies laid siege to it on 9 April. The place fell on the 14th after six Portuguese 24-pound cannons blasted a breach in the walls. The same week, Beresford was joined by a Spanish force numbering 3,000 infantry and 1,000 cavalry under General Francisco Javier Castaños.

== First phase ==
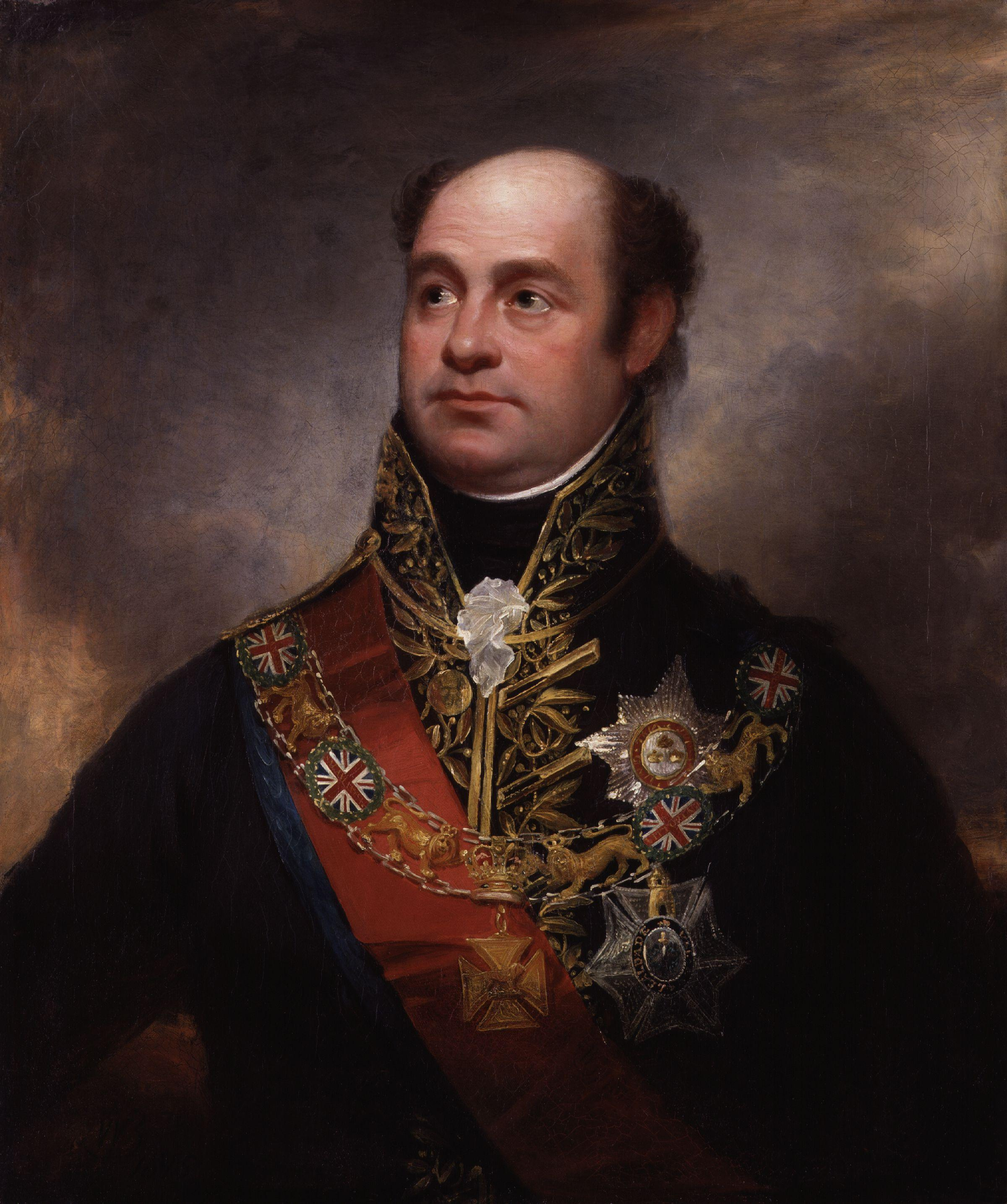
Portrait of Lord Beresford by William Beechey, 1815.

Before investing Badajoz, Beresford thought it worthwhile to drive Latour-Maubourg's force out of Extremadura. Leaving some troops to mask Badajoz, he marched southeast toward Zafra. Long routed the French 2nd Hussars at Los Santos de Maimona on 16 April. Abandoning Llerena on the 19th, Latour-Maubourg withdrew to Guadalcanal in Andalusia. Before starting the siege of Badajoz, Beresford posted Spanish cavalry at Llerena and British cavalry at Zafra. They were supported by a brigade of British infantry under Lieutenant Colonel John Colborne.

In any case, Beresford could not have besieged the fortress at once because no siege train had been assembled. Apparently, this was an oversight by Arthur Wellesley, Viscount Wellington who failed to issue the necessary orders. The main problem was that the British army in the Iberian Peninsula had never been provided by the home government with a proper siege train. Therefore, Major Alexander Dickson began forming a siege park from the Portuguese cannons available at Elvas. In the words of historian Charles Oman, "The walls of Elvas were a perfect museum of ancient artillery..." Some of the cannons that Dickson used had dates of 1620, 1636, 1646, and 1652 on their breeches. Even the pieces from the early 1700s were of an obsolete pattern. Most of the gunners were Portuguese, many only half trained. These were later supplemented by the personnel from British artillery batteries stationed at Lisbon in the companies of Captains Baynes, Bredin, Glubb, and Raynsford.

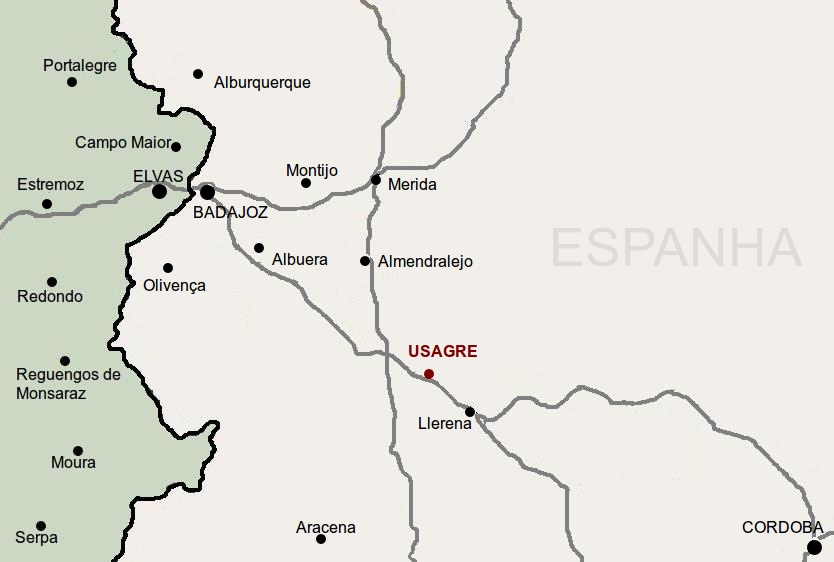
Map showing Badajoz, Elvas, Albuera, Campo Maior, Usagre, and Mérida

On 20 April, Wellington arrived on a flying visit from the northern front. By this time, his opponent Masséna had abandoned his campaign in Portugal and retreated into Spain. Two days later, Wellington accompanied Major General Charles Alten's newly-arrived brigade of the King's German Legion on a reconnaissance of Badajoz. A skirmish with the aggressive garrison ensued in which the Germans lost 50 to 60 casualties. Before leaving on the 25th, Wellington issued a set of comprehensive instructions to Beresford. On the advice of his chief engineer, Colonel Richard Fletcher, Wellington ordered that the main attack be directed on the San Cristobal, Picurina, and Pardeleras forts.

The siege began on 22 April 1811. Philippon's 4,000 defenders included the 1st Battalions of the 12th Light, 34th Line, and 88th Line Infantry Regiments and the 3rd Battalions of the 40th and 100th Line Infantry Regiments. To oppose the French, Beresford had 10,500 British and 10,200 Portuguese troops available. In case Soult tried to relieve Badajoz, Wellington arranged for as many as 15,000 Spanish troops to be ready to help. On 5 May Dickson reported that the siege train was finally ready. The next day, Beresford invested Badajoz south of the Guadiana with Alten's brigade, Major General William Lumley's British brigade, and Brigadier General Luiz Fonseca's Portuguese brigade. Lieutenant Colonel James Kemmis' 7th brigade and the 17th Portuguese Regiment took post on the north side opposite San Cristobal. Four more brigades were stationed in support between Badajoz and La Albuera. Meanwhile, Colborne conducted a successful campaign in the Sierra Morena with 2,000 men, causing Latour-Maubourg to fall back even farther.

Dickson assigned five 24-pound cannons and two howitzers to attack San Cristobal while 14 24-pound cannons and two 8-inch howitzers were deployed south of the river. On 8 April 1811, trenches were started on all three fronts at a distance of 400 yards (366 m) from the fortress. Opposite the Picurina fort, good progress was made, and a 10-gun battery was installed by the 11th. However, it was found almost impossible to dig trenches in front of San Cristobal because there was bedrock under a thin layer of topsoil. What little work could be done during the night had to be abandoned under deadly French fire during the day. Since trenches were out of the question, wooden gabions filled with soil had to be erected. On this front, Philippon launched a sortie on the evening of the 10th. The attack was repulsed, but the Allies pursued their enemies too far and came under murderous fire from San Cristobal. The French lost 200 men in the sortie; the British and Portuguese lost 438. On 11 April, a five-gun battery opened fire on the fort, but during the day four of its guns were put out of action by accurate French fire. By this time, six of the nine available engineers were casualties. A second battery was brought into action the next morning, but it was soon silenced. Shortly afterward, news arrived that Soult was rapidly approaching with an army of relief. Beresford ordered his troops to La Albuera to resist Soult's advance and sent the siege guns back to Elvas. The gabions were set on fire to deny the materials to the French. British losses in the failed siege numbered 533, nearly all in Kemmis' brigade, plus 200 Portuguese.

== Albuera ==
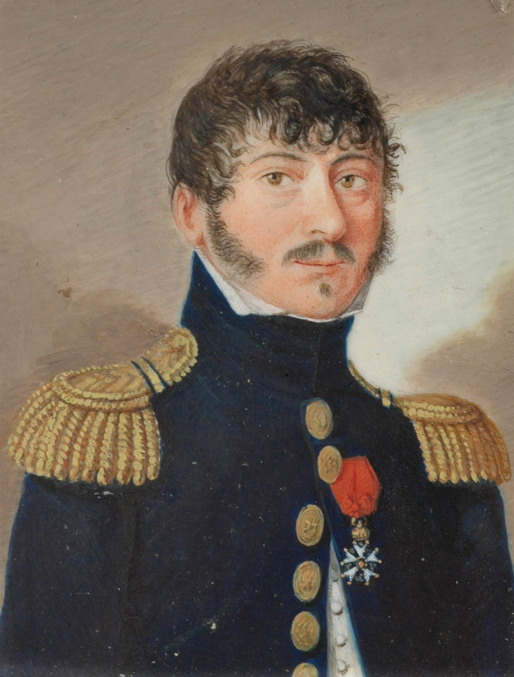
Armand Philippon

On 16 May 1811, Beresford defeated Soult in the Battle of Albuera. Soult's 24,246-man army included 4,000 cavalry and 48 artillery pieces. Beresford's 35,284-strong army included 13,928 Spaniards under Generals Joaquín Blake and Castaños. Losses in both armies were staggering. The French marshal reported losing 5,935 men including Generals of Brigade François Werlé and Joseph Pepin killed. However, since Soult reported only 262 officer losses while a more reliable source counted 362, the true figure may be as high as 7,900 killed, wounded, and captured. Allied losses numbered 5,904 including 1,359 Spaniards. Colborne's brigade lost five colors after being ridden down by the 1st Vistula Legion Lancers and the French 2nd Hussars. The all-British 2nd Division suffered 2,865 casualties including 661 killed; the British brigade of the 4th Division lost 1,065 men. The Spanish Guards and Irlanda Regiments fought and counted 98 killed and 517 wounded. Soult's crippled army retreated on the 18th, covered by his superior cavalry. While the armies were fighting, Philippon's troops filled in the Allied trenches and battery positions. The French commander also removed much of the topsoil around San Cristobal. The siege was resumed on the morning of 19 May by Hamilton's Portuguese troops.

On 14 May 1811, the 3rd and 7th Divisions left the northern front and set out for Badajoz under the command of General Thomas Picton. On 16 May, Wellington left General Brent Spencer in charge of the 26,000 infantry and 1,800 cavalry of the northern army. Wellington reached Badajoz on the 19th; Picton's divisions arrived on the 24th. Meanwhile, Soult retreated slowly southeast to Llerena with his large convoys of wounded soldiers, followed by Beresford and Blake. There was one notable clash at the Battle of Usagre on 25 May. Soult asked Latour-Maubourg to drive back the Allied cavalry to ascertain if infantry was present. The French dragoons ran into a trap and lost 250 killed and wounded plus another 78 captured. Lumley's cavalry lost only 20 casualties in the one-sided fight.

== Second phase ==
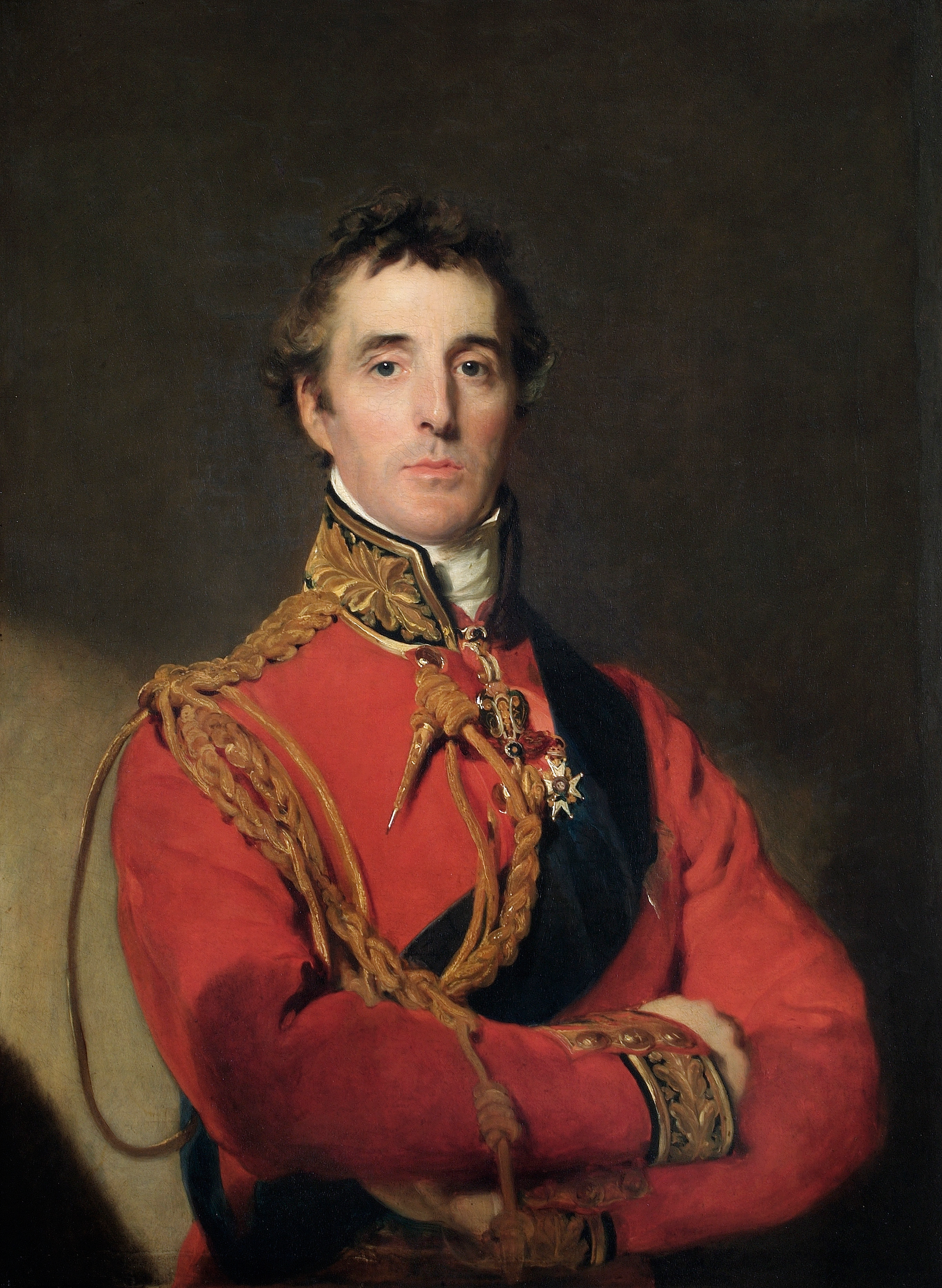
Viscount Wellington

On 27 May Beresford was officially replaced in command on the southern front. Four days later, General Rowland Hill arrived to take over the covering force, the 2nd and 4th Divisions plus Alten's brigade and Lumley's cavalry, approximately 10,000 men. Wellington personally took charge of the siege corps, which consisted of the 3rd and 7th Divisions and Hamilton's division. These troops numbered 14,000 including 700 gunners. Philippon's garrison consisted of 3,600 men. Again, Wellington's engineers, of whom there were only 25 available, urged him to attack the San Cristobal fort. In addition, a major effort was planned against the Castle on the south side of the Guadiana.

On 25 May, Major General William Houston's 7th Division invested the north side. Two days later, Picton's 3rd Division joined Hamilton's Portuguese south of the river. For the second leaguer, Dickson collected a siege train of 46 artillery pieces, 30 24-pound cannons, four 16-pound cannons, four 10-inch howitzers, and eight 8-inch howitzers. As in the earlier siege, all were ancient relics from the ramparts of Elvas. To serve the guns, 110 British from Raynesford's battery and 500 Portuguese were available.

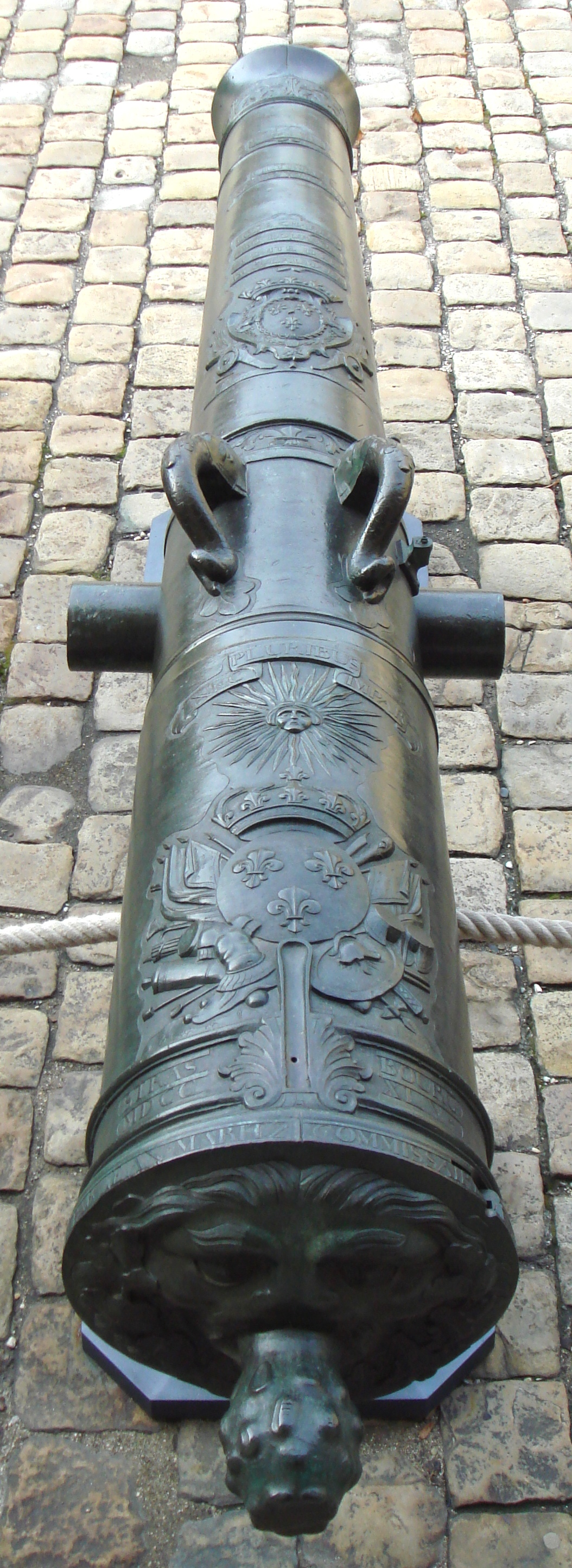
French 24-pound cannon barrel 1745

Picton's 3rd Division was made up of the British brigades of Colonel Henry MacKinnon and Major General Charles Colville. MacKinnon's brigade consisted of the 1st Battalions of the 4th Foot, 74th Highland, and 88th Foot. Colville's Brigade included the 2nd Battalions of the 5th Foot, 83rd Foot, and 88th Foot. Houston's 7th Division had the brigades of Major General John Sontag and Brigadier General John Doyle. Sontag's British brigade was made up of the 2nd Battalions of the 51st Foot and 85th Foot, eight companies of the Brunswick Oels, and one battalion of the Chasseurs Britanniques. Doyle's Portuguese brigade included the 7th and 19th Line Infantry Regiments and the 2nd Caçadores Battalion. Colonel Richard Collins led an independent Portuguese brigade that comprised the 5th Line Infantry Regiment and the 5th Caçadores Battalion. Hamilton's Portuguese Division included the brigades of Brigadier Generals Archibald Campbell and Fonseca. Campbell's brigade was made up of the 4th and 10th Line Infantry Regiments, while Fonseca's had the 2nd and 14th Line Infantry Regiments. All Portuguese infantry regiments consisted of 1st and 2nd Battalions.

During the night of the 30th, the first parallel was successfully started at a distance of 800 yards (732 m) from the Castle. Across the river, gabions were set up opposite San Cristobal and earth was brought up to fill them, but they were obliterated by French artillery fire in the morning. By the morning of 3 June, 16 24-pound cannons and four howitzers were emplaced against the Castle. Earlier, a battery was set up against San Cristobal but it proved to be ineffective because it was 1,200 yards (1,097 m) away. Wool packs, eight-gun and five-gun batteries were finally established 450 yards (411 m) from San Cristobal with a four-gun support battery right behind. The guns began battering Badajoz on 3 June and silenced the guns of San Cristobal. That day, the French knocked out one gun, but four more were out of action because of defects in the siege guns. The ancient pieces tended to droop at the muzzle if fired too quickly, often blew out their vents, or shook their old carriages to pieces. On the 4th, the French put a second gun out of action near the Castle, but two more were disabled by muzzle drooping and three howitzers had their carriages damaged by their own firing. On the north side, two cannons and two howitzers went out of commission because of similar problems. The bombardment continued through 5 and 6 June. The Castle proved very resistant to artillery fire but the San Cristobal fort showed considerable damage.

At midnight on 6 June 1811, 180 volunteers from Houston's division assaulted San Cristobal. The 25-man forlorn hope managed to reach to ditch with only minor casualties only to discover that the ditch had been cleared of debris and the breach had been blocked up by carts and chevaux de frise. The rest of the storming party poured into the ditch and tried to mount the wall. But the wall was 20 feet (6 m) high while their ladders were only 15 feet (5 m) long. Led by Captain Chauvin of the 88th Line, the defenders directed musketry at their attackers and rolled fuzed shells into the ditch. After an hour of futile effort, the Allied troops retreated with losses of 12 dead and 80 wounded. The French only lost one killed and five wounded in the affray.

After this failure, Wellington ordered three more days of bombardment. By 9 June, only 27 of the original 46 siege guns remained in action. On the 7th, six iron ship guns arrived from Lisbon and proved efficient. However, the defenses of the Castle were still formidable. To keep the French from clearing the ditch of debris, the Allied guns fired grape shot at the breach all night long. Despite losses, the French successfully carried out the necessary work. Since an assault on the Castle would have to cross at least 600 yards (549 m) of open ground and wade the Rivillas stream, the engineers decided that an attack would be hopeless. On the other hand, the San Cristobal fort was a wreck, with two breaches in its walls. Nevertheless, its garrison had been doubled and the men cleared the ditches and blocked up the breaches every night. Each defender was supplied with three muskets, plus grenades and live shells.

On 9 June 1811 at 9:00 PM, Houston launched his second assault on San Cristobal. The storming party consisted of 400 soldiers from Sontag's brigade and the 17th Portuguese Line. It was supported by 100 sharpshooters who were ordered to shoot at any Frenchman who appeared at the breaches. The French opened a heavy fire as soon as the attackers appeared. The major commanding the column and the ranking engineer lieutenant were both killed at once. The attackers put up their 16 ladders but most of the men were shot down. The few who managed to reach the top were bayonetted by courageous groups of Frenchmen who charged down the breach. After fifty minutes, most of the ladders were smashed and the Allied survivors fled back to their trenches. The attackers lost 54 through being killed, 81 being wounded, and four being captured.

On 10 June, a truce was agreed so that the Allies could recover their many wounded. During this lull, the defenders of San Cristobal repaired their defenses. Even so, Philippon's situation was critical. The Allied guns had breached the Castle and the French commander was compelled to put his garrison on half-rations. Philippon drew up a desperate plan to break out when his provisions failed. However, on the 10th Wellington decided to abandon the siege. He received intelligence that Marshal Auguste Marmont was coming south with the Army of Portugal. When he joined Soult, the combined French strength would become dangerous. The threat could not materialize until 15 June, but Wellington felt that further operations were unlikely to succeed. That night, the siege guns were withdrawn.

== Relief ==
Shortly after being defeated by Wellington at the Battle of Fuentes de Oñoro on 3 to 5 May 1811, Masséna was replaced by Marmont. The new commander abolished the existing corps and created six independent divisions in their place. Likewise, General of Division Jean-Baptiste Drouet, Comte d'Erlon's IX Corps was broken up and its battalions ordered to join Soult's army. With surprising speed, Marmont marched for the south also. When he discovered his opponent on the move, Spencer transferred his corps to the south and joined Wellington at Elvas on 17 June. Marmont, d'Erlon, and Soult combined forces at Mérida on 18 June and lunged to the west. The 60,000-man French army relieved Badajoz then confronted Wellington's 50,000 troops along the Guadiana near Elvas. The French commanders declined to attack the formidable British position. Soon after, Soult was called away to deal with threats from Andalusia. After resupplying Philippon's garrison, Marmont and d'Erlon withdrew.

== Aftermath ==
The stalemate in the west proceeded with the Blockade of Almeida.
