= Siege of Badajoz (1812) =

Part of the Peninsular War

- Part of the Peninsular War
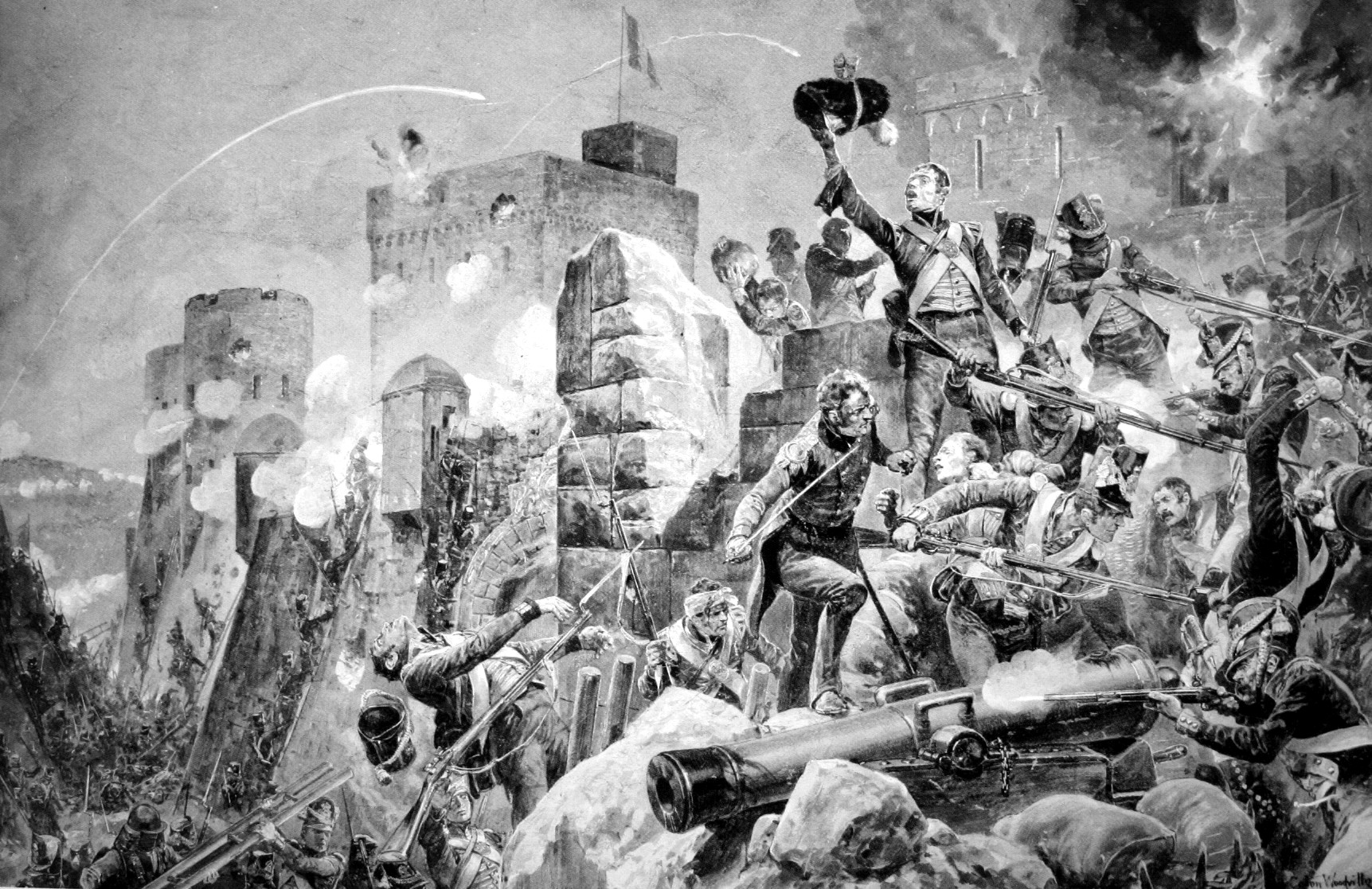
- "The Devil's Own" 88th Regiment at the Siege of Badajoz, by Richard Caton Woodville
Date	16 March – 6 April 1812; (3 weeks)
Location	Badajoz, Spain 38°52′49″N 6°58′31″W
Result	Coalition victory

Belligerents
(First French Empire) French Empire	(United Kingdom of Great Britain and Ireland) United Kingdom; Portugal

Commanders and leaders
(First French Empire) Armand Philippon (surrendered)	(United Kingdom of Great Britain and Ireland) Arthur Wellesley

Strength
4,742–5,000	27,000; 52 guns

Casualties and losses
1,300–1,500 killed or wounded 3,500–3,700 captured	4,760–4,924 killed or wounded
- 200–4,000 Spanish civilians killed or injured (Note: It has been variously stated that 4,000 civilians had been killed or injured, however no reliable primary sources have been cited to confirm this number)

Peninsular War
Castile 1811–13
current battle

In the siege of Badajoz (16 March – 6 April 1812), also called the third siege of Badajoz, an Anglo-Portuguese Army under the command of the Arthur Wellesley, the Earl of Wellington (who was later made Duke of Wellington) besieged Badajoz, Spain, and forced the surrender of the French garrison. The siege was one of the bloodiest in the Napoleonic Wars and was considered a costly victory by the British, with some 4,800 Allied soldiers killed or wounded in a few short hours of intense fighting during the storming of the breaches as the siege drew to an end. Enraged at the huge number of casualties they suffered in seizing the city, the troops broke into houses and stores consuming vast quantities of alcohol with many of them then going on a rampage, threatening their officers and ignoring their commands to desist, and even killing several. It took three days before the men were brought back into order. When order was restored, an estimated 200–300 civilians had been killed or injured.

== Background ==
After the allied campaign in Spain had started with the siege of Ciudad Rodrigo and the capture in earlier sieges of the frontier towns of Almeida and Ciudad Rodrigo, Wellington's army moved south to Badajoz to capture this frontier town and secure the lines of communication back to Lisbon, the primary base of operations for the allied army. Badajoz was garrisoned by some 5,000 French soldiers under General Armand Philippon, the town commander, and possessed much stronger fortifications than either Almeida or Ciudad Rodrigo. With a strong curtain wall covered by numerous strongpoints and bastions, Badajoz had already faced two unsuccessful sieges and was well prepared for a third attempt, with the walls strengthened and some areas around the curtain wall flooded or mined with explosives.

== Siege ==
The allied army, some 27,000 strong, outnumbered the French garrison by around five to one and after encircling the town on 17 March 1812, began to lay siege by preparing trenches, parallels and earthworks to protect the heavy siege artillery, work made difficult by a week of prolonged and torrential rainfalls, which also swept away bridging works that were needed to bring the heavy cannon and supplies forward.

=== Assaults and sallys ===
On 19 March the French made a strong sally with 1,500 men and 40 cavalry which surprised the working parties and caused losses of 150 officers and men before being repulsed. Amongst the wounded was Lieutenant-Colonel Richard Fletcher, the chief engineer. By 25 March batteries were firing on the outwork, Fort Picurina, which that night was stormed by 500 men and seized by British troops from Lieutenant-General Thomas Picton's 3rd Division. Casualties were high with 50 killed and 250 wounded, but the fort was captured. The French made several raids to try to destroy the lines advancing toward the curtain wall, but were repeatedly fended off by the famed British 95th Rifles while simultaneously being counter-attacked by line infantry.

The capture of the bastion allowed more extensive siege earthworks to be dug and with the arrival of heavy 18 lb (8.2 kg) and 24 lb (11 kg) siege guns, breaching batteries were established. On 31 March the allies began an intense bombardment of the town's defences. Soon a maze of trenches was creeping up to the high stone walls as the cannons continued to blast away at the stonework. On 2 April an attempt was made to destroy a barrier that had been erected amongst the arches of the bridge to cause flooding that was hampering the siege. The explosion of 450 lbs of powder was only partly successful.

=== Breaches made ===
By 5 April two breaches had been made in the curtain wall and the soldiers readied themselves to storm Badajoz. The order to attack was delayed for 24 hours to allow another breach to be made in the wall. News began to filter to the allies that Marshal Soult was marching to relieve the town and an order was given to launch the attack at 22:00 on 6 April.

The French garrison were well aware of what was to come and, in between the cessation of siege guns at 19:30 and the start of the assault at 22:00, protected the large breaches in the walls with harrows, caltrops, and chevaux de frise in preparation for the imminent assault.

=== Final assault ===
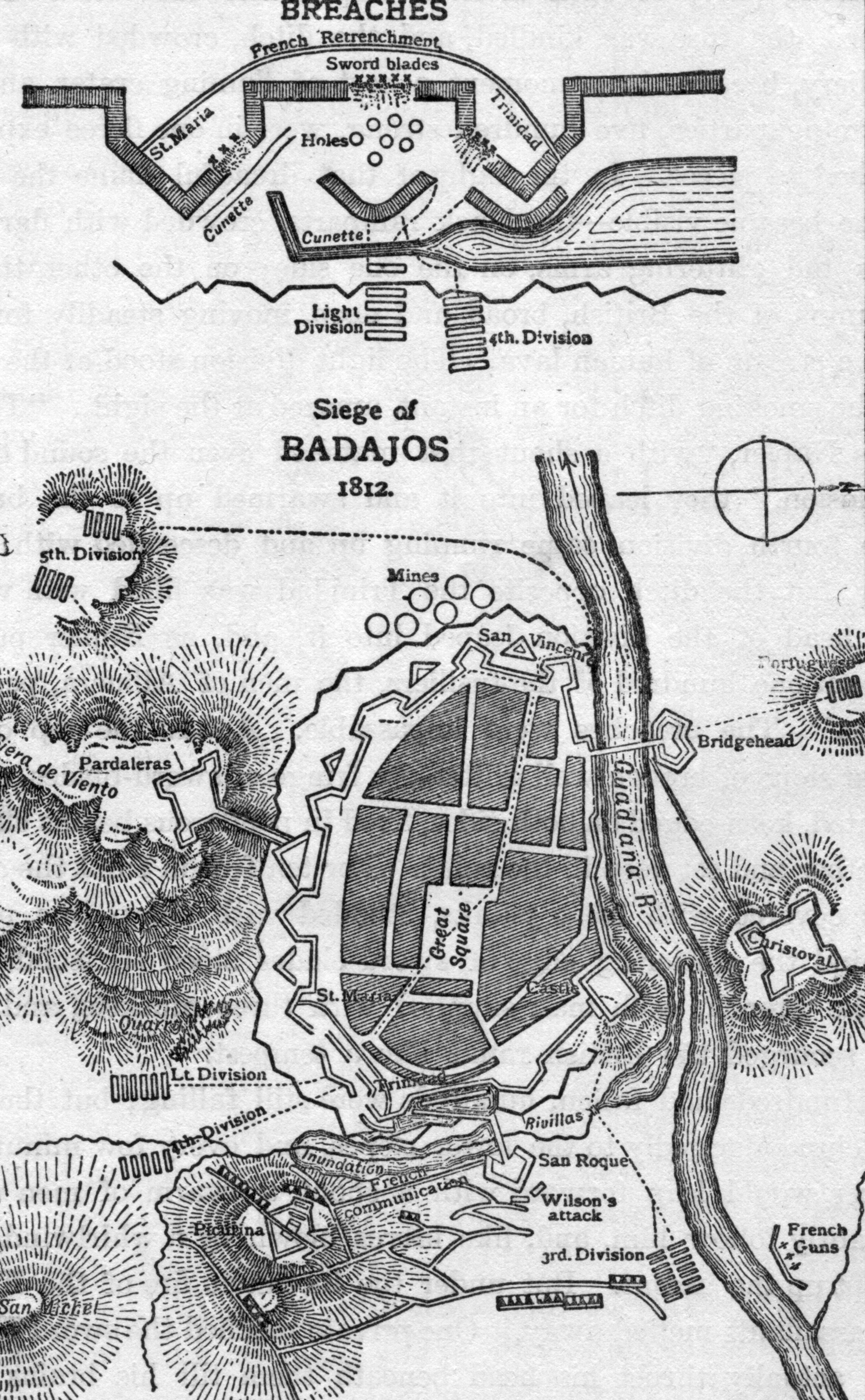
Siege of Badajoz

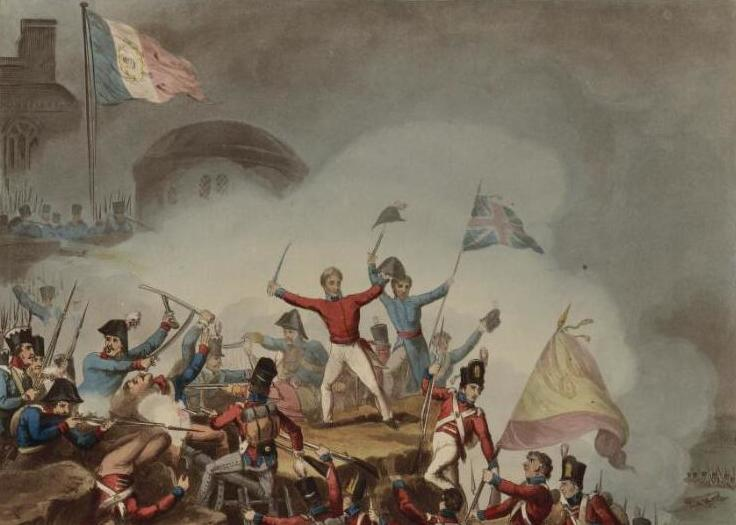
General Sir Thomas Picton storming the Castle of Badajos. March 31st 1812

With three large gaps in the curtain wall and being aware of Marshal Soult marching to the town's aid, Wellington ordered his regiments to storm the town so at 22:00 on the 6th and the troops made their way forward with scaling ladders and various tools. Three attacks would be mounted. The first men to assault the breaches were the men of the forlorn hope, who would lead the main attack by the 4th Division on two of the breaches. The third breach would be assaulted by Alten's Light Division, while diversionary attacks were to be made to the north and the east by Portuguese while British soldiers of the 5th Division and Picton's 3rd Division would assault the Castle from across the river.

Just as the main forlorn hope were beginning their attack, a French sentry was alerted and raised the alarm. Within seconds, the ramparts were filled with French soldiers, who poured a lethal hail of musket fire into the troops at the base of the breach. The British and Portuguese surged forward en masse and raced up to the wall, facing a murderous barrage of musket fire, complemented by grenades, stones, barrels of gunpowder with crude fuses and bales of burning hay to provide light.

The furious barrage devastated the British soldiers at the wall and the breach soon began to fill with dead and wounded over whom the storming troops had to struggle. The carnage, rubble and loss of guiding engineering officers led Alten's Light Division to become confused; assaulting an outlying ravelin that led nowhere, the troops became mixed with those of the 4th Division. Despite the carnage, the British continued to surge forward in great numbers, only to be mown down by endless volleys and shrapnel from grenades and bombs. The French could see that they were holding off the assault and that the British were becoming stupefied and incapable of further exertion. In just under two hours, some 2,000 men had been killed or badly wounded at the main breach, while many more men of the 3rd Division were shot down as they made their diversionary assault.

Picton's 3rd Division managed to reach the top of the castle wall – without Picton, who was wounded as he climbed a ladder to try to reach the top of the wall – and found themselves secure within the castle but, as all entrances into the town were blocked, unable to come immediately to the assistance of the other divisions.

Everywhere they attacked, the allied soldiers were being halted and the carnage was so immense that Wellington was about to call a halt to the assault when he heard that the soldiers had gained a foothold in the castle. He ordered that the castle gates be blown and that the 3rd Division should support the assaults on the breaches with a flank attack.

The 5th Division, which had been delayed because their ladder party had become lost, now attacked the San Vicente bastion; losing 600 men, they eventually made it to the top of the curtain wall. Major Lord FitzRoy Somerset, Wellington's military secretary (and the future Field Marshal the Lord Raglan), was the first to mount the breach, and afterwards secured one of the gates to enable access for British reinforcements before the French could organise a fresh defence.

The town's fate was sealed with the linking up with men of the 3rd and 5th Divisions, who were also making their way into the town. Once they had a foothold, the British and Portuguese soldiers had an advantage. Seeing that he could no longer hold out, General Philippon withdrew from Badajoz to the neighbouring outwork of San Cristobal; he surrendered shortly after the town had fallen.

When dawn finally came on 7 April, it revealed the horror of the slaughter all around the curtain wall. Bodies were piled high and blood flowed like rivers in the ditches and trenches. Surveying the destruction and slaughter Wellington wept openly at the sight of British dead piled upon each other in the breaches and bitterly cursed the British Parliament for granting him so few resources and soldiers. The assault and the earlier skirmishes had left the allies with some 4,800 casualties. Numbers differ between 4,760 and 4,924. The elite Light Division had suffered badly, losing some 40 percent of their fighting strength.

=== Rampage ===
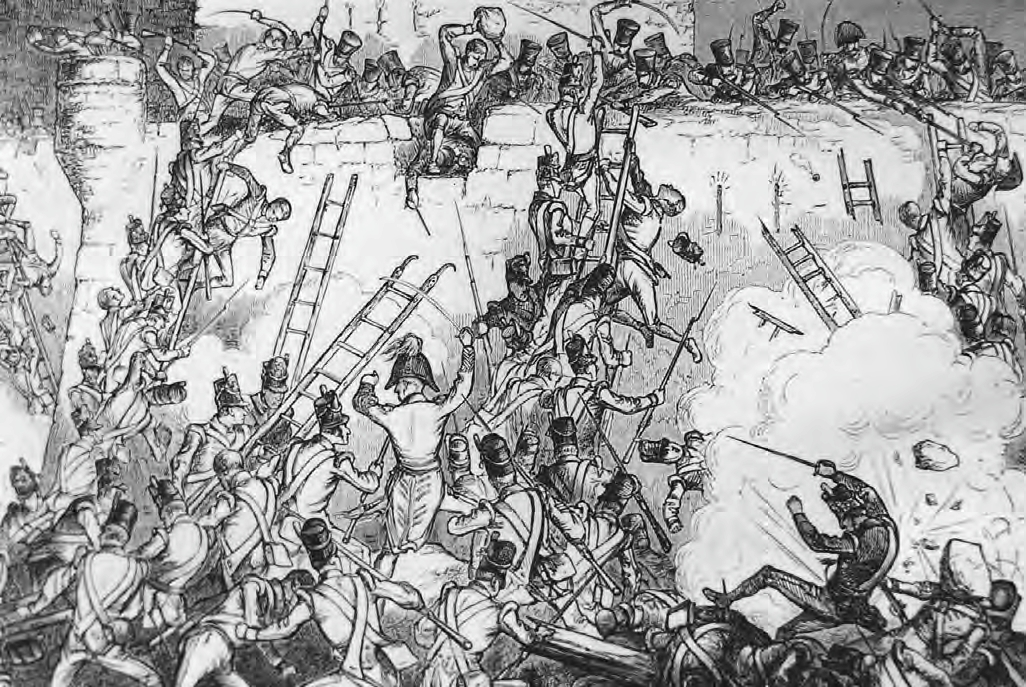
British infantry attempt to scale the walls of Badajoz, the site of one of several bloody sieges conducted during the Peninsular War.

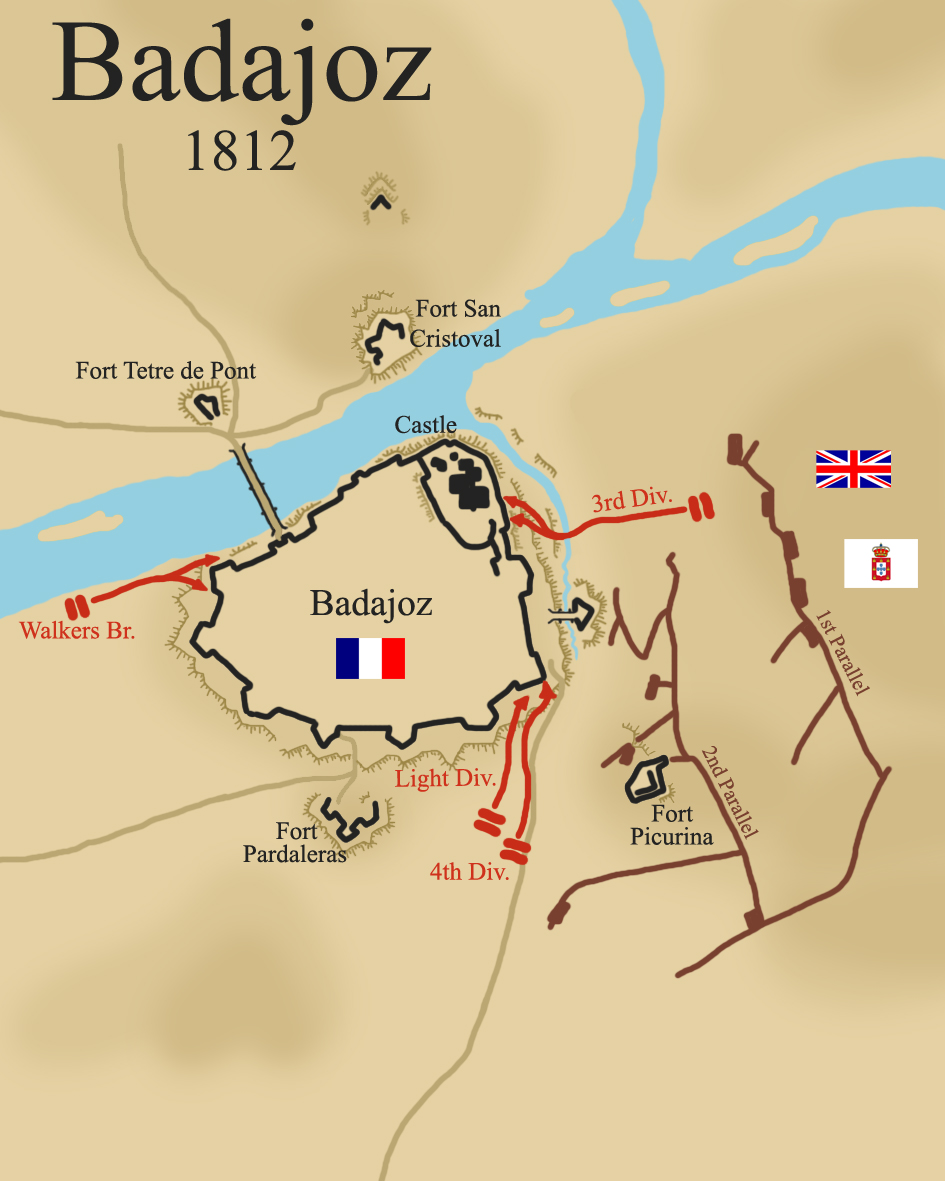
Siege of Badajoz

After the capture of the city, British troops became drunk on stocks of captured alcohol and began rampaging through the city. During the sack of Badajoz, numerous homes were broken into, private property was vandalized or stolen, civilians of all ages and backgrounds raped and many British officers trying to bring the rampaging troops to order were shot by the men. Captain Robert Blakeney wrote:

The infuriated soldiery resembled rather a pack of hell hounds vomited up from infernal regions for the extirpation of mankind than what they were but twelve short hours previously – a well-organised, brave, disciplined and obedient British Army, and burning only with impatience for what is called glory.

Despite this, some historians have defended the actions of the British soldiers by arguing that the aftermath could not have been avoided considering the ferocity of the battle. Ian Fletcher argues:

Let us not forget that hundreds of British troops were killed and maimed by the fury of the respective assaults, during which men saw their comrades and brothers slaughtered before their very eyes. Should we really condemn them for feeling some degree of bitterness, for wanting to vent their anger upon somebody? The storming of a fortress is not the same as a battle where men expect casualties to occur. But when a force was asked to storm a fortress when practicable breaches had been formed, such casualties would have been deemed unnecessary. Given the enormity of the task facing the stormers in the Peninsula, I for one begrudge them none of their feelings of anger and desire for revenge.

On the other hand, Myatt writes:

Presumably one can return to the laws of war which, imprecise though they were, did at least suggest propriety of a surrender when a practicable breach had been made, to which Phillipon might very justifiably have retorted that practicable was not a recognisable description of breaches on which two of the best divisions in the British Army had failed to make any impressions, even though the extent of their effort can be measured by their losses.

After fifteen to eighteen hours Wellington finally issued an order that the sack of Badajoz should cease and ordered detachments to restore order beginning at 5 a.m. the next day. However, it took another 72 hours before military order was completely restored in the ranks. Many British soldiers were flogged as punishment and a gallows was erected, though no one was hanged.

== Aftermath ==
The most detailed study of the effects of the British sacking of Badajoz is undoubtedly the one published in 1983 by Spanish historian Eladio Méndez Venegas from data collected in the Diocesan Archives of Badajoz. Research into the local archives have established that only about 300 families (between 1,200 and 1,500 people) had remained in the city. A document drawn up at the time by the priest of the Parish of Conception, which is signed ‘Bances’, presents in two folios the detailed list, per street/per parish, of the civilian dead and injured. The conclusion is that the total could be as high as 250, possibly even 280. These numbers indicated that between 20% and 30% of the Spanish civilians who were living near or within the walls of Badajoz were killed or injured during the sack of the city.

In a letter to Lord Liverpool, written the following day, Wellington confided:

The storming of Badajoz affords as strong an instance of the gallantry of our troops as has ever been displayed. But I greatly hope that I shall never again be the instrument of putting them to such a test as that to which they were put last night.

From an engineering view point, the requirement to undertake the assault in a hasty manner, relying upon bayonet charges, rather than scientific methods of approach, undoubtedly resulted in heavier casualties, as did the lack of a corps of trained sappers. The siege was to lead, within two weeks, to the formation of the Royal School of Military Engineering.

Wellington advanced into Spain leading to the Battle of Salamanca in a continuation of the Coalition campaign of 1812.

== See also ==
- Badajoz bastioned enclosure

=== In fiction ===
- 'Sharpe's Company', novel by Bernard Cornwell

It also has a television version of it including the rampage

== Notes ==
Preceded by Siege of Ciudad Rodrigo (1812)	Napoleonic Wars; Siege of Badajoz (1812)	Succeeded by Battle of Villagarcia
