= Armand Philippon =

French soldier (1761–1836)

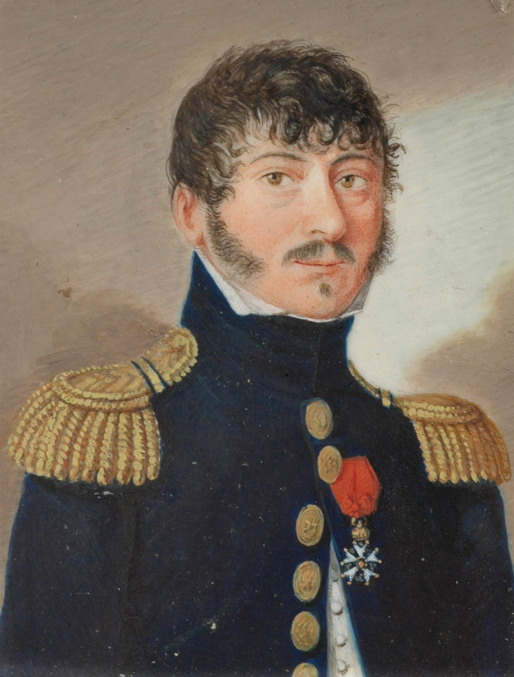
- Armand Phillipon c. 1803
- Born: 27 August 1761; Rouen, France
- Died: 4 May 1836 (aged 74); Paris, France
- Military career
- Allegiance: (France) French Empire
- Branch: Army
- Service years: 1778–1814
- Rank: General of division
- Conflicts: French Revolutionary Wars; Peninsular War

Armand Philippon (English: /fiːliːˈpɒ̃/ fee-lee-PON, French: [aʁmɑ̃ filipɔ̃]; 27 August 1761 – 4 May 1836), sometimes called Phillipon, was a French military officer of the French Revolutionary Wars and Napoleonic Wars.

Despite enlisting in the army as a private soldier, Philippon rose to the rank of general of division during the Peninsular War, and was created Baron in 1809. He was Governor of Badajoz between 1811 and 1812, when he was captured by the British following the Battle of Badajoz. After his capture, Philippon was taken to the UK, but he broke his parole and returned to France and the Grande Armée before retiring from military service on 15 January 1814.

== Biography ==
Philippon was born in Rouen on 27 August 1761, and enlisted as a soldier in the Regiment of Lorraine on 15 April 1778. He was promoted to corporal on 16 April 1785, sergeant in November 1786 and sergeant major on 15 April 1790. He received his commission on 9 August 1792, when he was named captain in the 7th battalion of Bec-d'Ambès. He spent 1792–93 campaigning with the Army of the North, under the command of Generals Joseph Marie Servan de Gerbey and Jacques Léonard Muller, before joining the Army of the Western Pyrenees under General Bon Adrien Jeannot de Moncey. While serving on the Spanish border, Philippon distinguished himself by capturing a fort at Irurtzun, defended by 2,500 Spanish troops, with only 600 men. This act of bravery resulted in Philippon's promotion to Adjutant-General and provisional chef de brigade.

Philippon was transferred to the Army of the West in Year IV (1795–1796), then posted to the Army of the Danube in Year VII (1798–1799) where he was given command of the 87th demi-brigade. The years IX–XI (1800–1803) were spent campaigning in Grisons, Valais, Switzerland and Italy, and in October 1803 he became Colonel of the 54th Line Regiment.

After moving to the French Army of Hanover, Philippon was made a member of the Légion d'honneur on 19 Frimaire Year XII (November 1803) and an officer of that order on 25 Prairial (14 June 1804). He served in Spain during the Peninsular War from 1808, was created a baron in 1809, and saw action with General Pierre Lapisse's division of Marshal Victor's I Corps at the Battle of Talavera and the Siege of Cádiz. Philippon's conduct at Cádiz resulted in his promotion to brigade general on 25 June 1810.

Philippon took part in Marshal Soult's expedition into Extremadura in 1811, and distinguished himself again at the Battle of the Gebora. Following the capture by the French of the important fortress town of Badajoz after the first siege of Badajoz, Philippon was named Governor of the town on 11 March 1811, and he made his name defending the fortress through the second siege. While Sir William Beresford, the commander of the Allied Anglo–Spanish–Portuguese corps besieging Badajoz, was defending against Soult's attempt to relieve the siege at the Battle of Albuera, Philippon led a sally from Badajoz and destroyed much of the abandoned siege-works, and continued to offer resistance to Allies until the siege was lifted on 20 June.

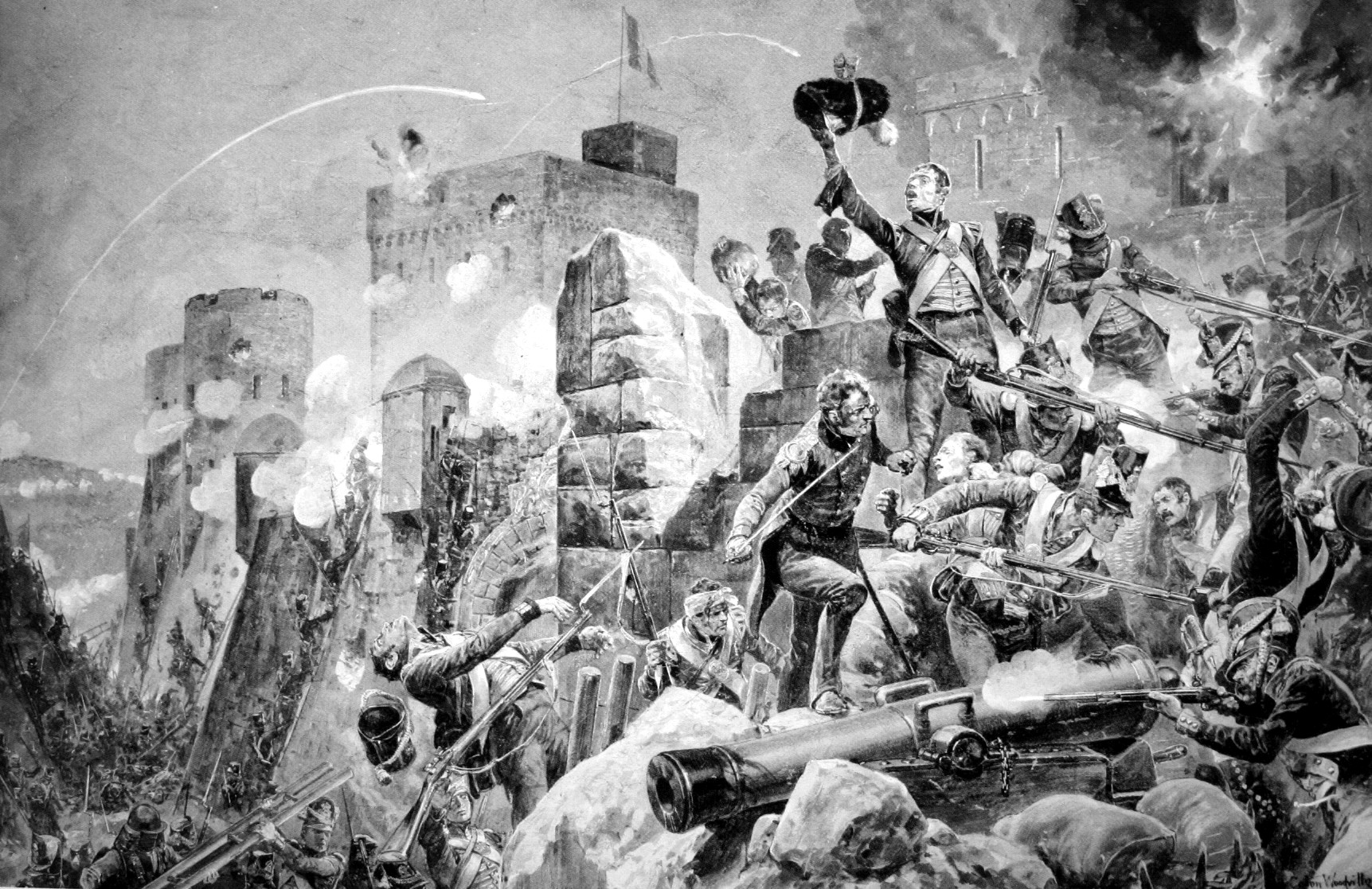
Siege of Badajoz. Watercolour en grisaille by Richard Caton Woodville Jr.

In recognition of his defence of Badajoz, Philippon was promoted to general of division on 9 July 1811, and he remained in command of the fortress's garrison. When the Allies returned to lay siege to the town in 1812, Philippon's defences once more obstructed attempts to capture it. The obstructions he constructed made the breaches in the fortress's walls impregnable, and Badajoz was only captured following the unexpected success of a diversionary escalade. When the town fell to the Allies on 6 April, following the Battle of Badajoz, Philippon retreated to the outlying fort at San Cristóbal, across the Guadiana river, but was forced to surrender the following day. He was taken first to Lisbon, and then shipped to England, where he took up residence in Oswestry. In July 1812, however, he broke his parole, left Oswestry, and with the help of smugglers from Rye, Sussex, he returned to France.

Having returned to the Grande Armée in August 1812, Philippon was given command of the 1st Division, 1 Corps on 23 March 1813. In April of that year, he transferred to 11 Corps, and campaigned with General Dominique Vandamme in Bohemia. It was Philippon's skilled manoeuvring following the Battle of Kulm that allowed the remnants of the Vandamme's army to retreat to Dresden, where Philippon was made prisoner along with Laurent Gouvion Saint-Cyr's Corps.

Returning to France at the time of the First Restoration, Philippon was created a Knight of Saint Louis, retired from military service on 15 January 1814, and died on 4 May 1836.
