= Henry MacKinnon =

British Army officer

Major-General Henry MacKinnon
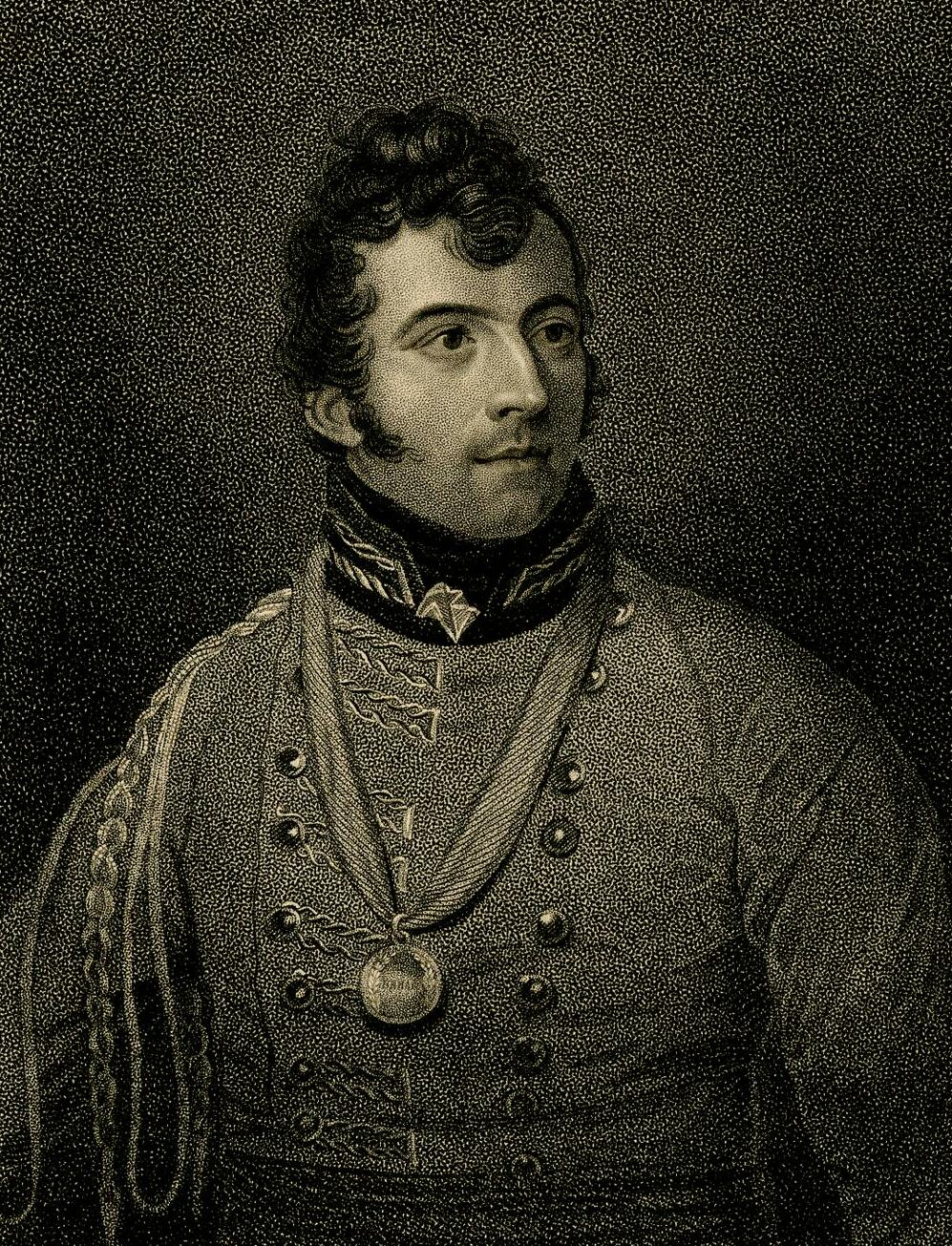
- Born: August 1773; Longwood House, Winchester, England
- Died: 19 January 1812 (aged 38); Ciudad Rodrigo, Spain
- Burial place: Espeja, Spain
- Spouse: Catherine Call
- Relatives: Daniel Mackinnon (nephew)
- Military career
- Allegiance: United Kingdom
- Branch: British Army
- Service years: 1790–1812
- Rank: Major-General
- Unit: Coldstream Guards
- Commands: Talavera garrison Brigade, 3rd Division
- Conflicts: French Revolutionary Wars; Irish Rebellion of 1798; Battle of Antrim; Battle of Ballynahinch; Anglo-Russian invasion of Holland; Battle of Bergen; Battle of Alkmaar; Egypt campaign; Battle of Abukir; Battle of Alexandria; Napoleonic Wars; Hanover Expedition; Copenhagen Expedition; Peninsular War; Second Battle of Porto; Battle of Talavera; Battle of Bussaco; Battle of Redinha; Battle of Fuentes de Oñoro; Siege of Ciudad Rodrigo †
- Awards: Army Gold Medal with two clasps

Major-General Henry MacKinnon (August 1773 – 19 January 1812), was a British soldier. He commanded the 45th Regiment of Foot, 74th (Highland) Regiment of Foot, and 88th Regiment of Foot in the Napoleonic Peninsular War under the Duke of Wellington. He was killed by the explosion of an enemy magazine during the Siege of Ciudad Rodrigo on 19 January 1812.

Prior to the Napoleonic wars, MacKinnon had a cordial acquaintance with Napoleon Bonaparte while the former's father resided in the French Province of Dauphiny when Napoleon was a frequent visitor to the region.
