= Jean Léonard Barrié =

Jean Léonard Barrié, (French pronunciation: [ʒɑ̃ le.ɔnaʁ baʁje]; 28 February 1762 in Saint-Béat, Haute-Garonne − 15 February 1848 in Toulouse) was a French general of the Napoleonic era.

== Biography ==
=== From volunteer to Chief of Brigade ===
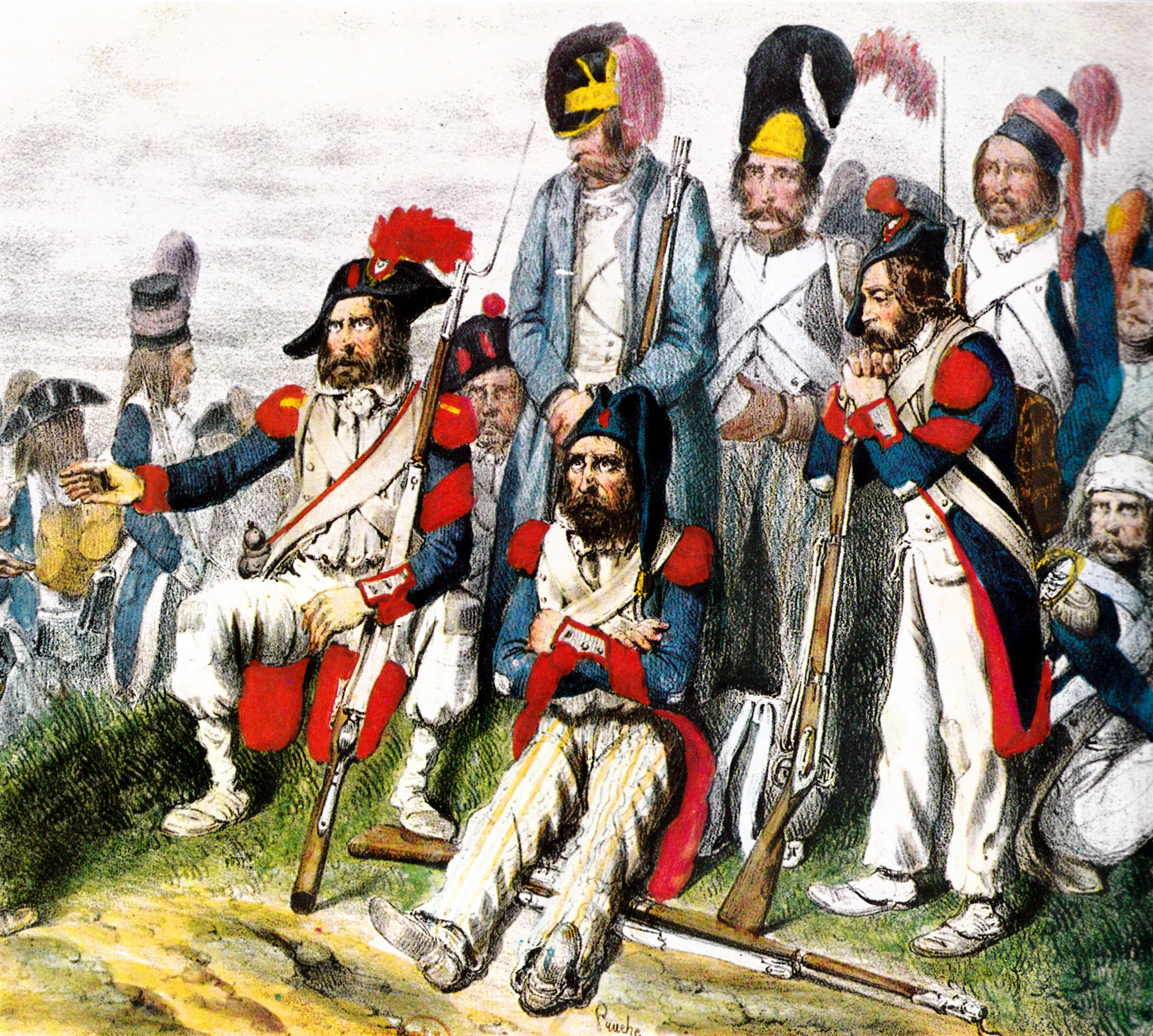
The Italian Army in 1796 by the lithographer Pauchs. Barrié was in Italy almost continuously from 1796 to 1799.

He entered the army as a volunteer on 21 September 1792 in the 1st Saint-Gaudens Battalion and became a captain on 28 October following.

== See also ==
- List of French generals of the Revolutionary and Napoleonic Wars

== Sources ==
- Six, Georges (1934). Dictionnaire biographique des généraux et amiraux de la Révolution et de l'Empire, Vol. I (in French). Paris, France: Librairie historique et nobiliaire. ISBN 978-2-402-49916-3.
