= Battle of Villelongue =

Event during the War of the Pyrenees

Coordinates: 42°31′35″N 2°54′15″E

- Part of War of the Pyrenees
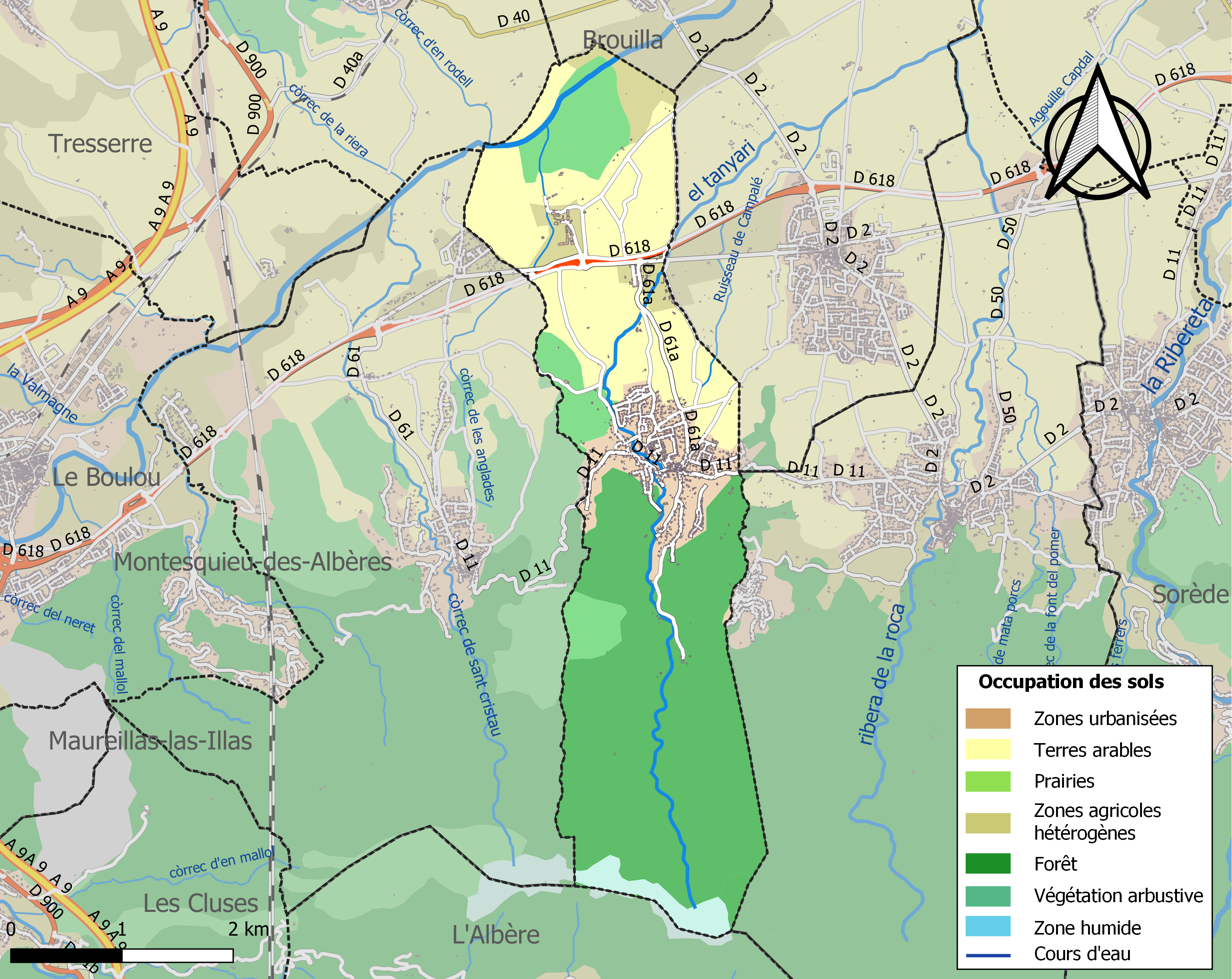
- Modern map shows Villeongue-dels-Monts in relation to Le Boulou, Brouilla, and Montesquieu.
Date	7 and 18 December 1793
Location	Villelongue-dels-Monts, Pyrénées-Orientales, France
Result	Spanish-Portuguese victory

Belligerents
Kingdom of Spain; Kingdom of Portugal	Republican France

Commanders and leaders
(Spain) Antonio Ricardos (Kingdom of Portugal) John Forbes	(France) François Doppet (France) Eustache d'Aoust

Units involved
Army of Catalonia (Portugal) Army of Assistance to the Crown of Spain	(France) Army of the Eastern Pyrenees

Strength
7 Dec.: 8,000	7 Dec.: 10,000, 40 guns

Casualties and losses
7 Dec.: 56	7 Dec.: 652, 26 guns

The Battle of Villelongue (7 and 18 December 1793) saw a Royal Spanish force from the army commanded by Antonio Ricardos attack a position held by a Republican French force from the army led by François Amédée Doppet. Spanish and French attack columns passed each other in the night without detecting each other. On 7 December, the Spanish attack on Villelongue-dels-Monts was delivered first and was completely successful, causing the French soldiers to flee. On 18 December, in order to cover a planned withdrawal, Doppet ordered an attack on the Portuguese garrison at Villelongue. Eustache Charles d'Aoust carried out the operation and overwhelmed the Portuguese. However, two days later, the French army was disastrously defeated at the Battle of Collioure and had to beat a hasty retreat to Perpignan.

== Background ==
The representatives-on-mission controlled the operations of the Army of the Eastern Pyrenees to a greater degree than any other army of Republican France. Historian Ramsay Weston Phipps proposed that it was because there were so few regular army units and because the representatives were natives of the area. Representative Raymond Gaston insisted, "I alone should command here, and I shall be obeyed". Another representative, Claude Dominique Côme Fabre imported 100 Jacobins from Paris as political agents into the army where they spread indiscipline and disorder. The army also suffered from the fact that supplies properly belonging to it were diverted to the Army of the Alps or the Army of Italy. Consequently, the soldiers were badly fed and clothed, the horses were starving, and many of the men's muskets were in poor working order.

On 9 March 1793, the French First Republic declared war on the Kingdom of Spain. On 17 April, Antonio Ricardos' Spanish army invaded France and captured Céret in the Tech River valley. On 20 May, Ricardos defeated a French force at the Battle of Mas Deu. In the Siege of Bellegarde, the Spanish army took several weeks to reduce the fortress. On 17 July, Louis-Charles de Flers successfully fended off Ricardos' attack in the Battle of Perpignan. Despite this, the representatives-on-mission sacked Flers on 7 August and selected Hilarion Paul Puget de Barbantane to replace him. Flers was guillotined during the Reign of Terror.

Ricardos constructed four entrenched camps around Perpignan, the most threatening one being to the northwest of the city at Peyrestortes. Barbantane panicked and cravenly abandoned the army, leaving it leaderless. In the Battle of Peyrestortes on 17 September 1793, Eustache Charles d'Aoust leading troops from Perpignan and Jacques Gilles Henri Goguet directing the division at Salses-le-Château managed to execute a converging attack, driving the Spanish from their camp. Soon after, Luc Siméon Auguste Dagobert appeared with the Cerdagne division and assumed command of the army. On 22 September, Dagobert's army suffered a defeat in the Battle of Truillas. Though victorious, Ricardos retreated to the Tech valley where his soldiers built a fortified camp at Le Boulou. Shortly afterward, Dagobert quarreled with the representatives, resigned his army command, and returned with his division to the Cerdagne. The temporary commander, d'Aoust unsuccessfully assaulted the Spanish camp in early October at the First Battle of Boulou. On 11 October 1793, Louis Marie Turreau arrived to take command of the army.

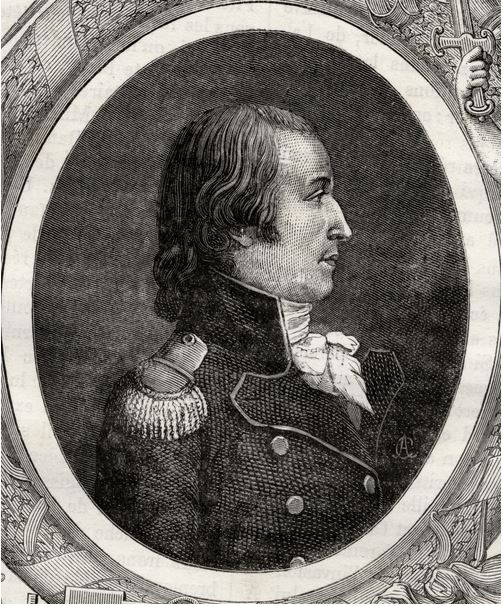
François Doppet

Turreau was shocked at the way the representatives-on-mission dictated orders to the generals. Since the French government neglected to send the formal announcement of his appointment, Turreau decided to simply observe events. Fabre's latest project was to send a force across the mountains to attack the port of Roses. Neither Turreau nor Dagobert approved of the scheme, so d'Aoust led the effort on 26 October 1793. Three columns, two of which were led by Louis Pierre Delattre and Bertrand Clausel, were supposed to first converge on Espolla, but only Delattre's appeared. The operation totally failed, and Spanish troops chased the French back across the Pyrenees. Jean Lannes, future Marshal of the Empire, was shot in the left arm in this fiasco. Turreau discovered that the representatives had a new project, which he and Dagobert opposed. After the representatives accused him of treason, Dagobert left for Paris. There Dagobert complained to the Committee of Public Safety, "Are the plans of Fabre and Gaston like the Ark of the Lord which one cannot touch with one's finger without being struck dead?"

The French government appointed François Amédée Doppet to command the army, but he would not arrive until 28 November, so d'Aoust again commanded provisionally from 22 to 27 November. On 26 November 1793, Ricardos, reinforced by 6,000 Portuguese soldiers led by John Forbes, attacked the French fieldworks at Saint-Ferréol north of Céret. The operation was carried out by 7,000–8,000 troops led by Luis Fermín de Carvajal, Conde de la Unión, and captured three French batteries. A former doctor, Doppet found that he was unable to contend with the overbearing representatives, and they virtually ignored him.

== Battle ==
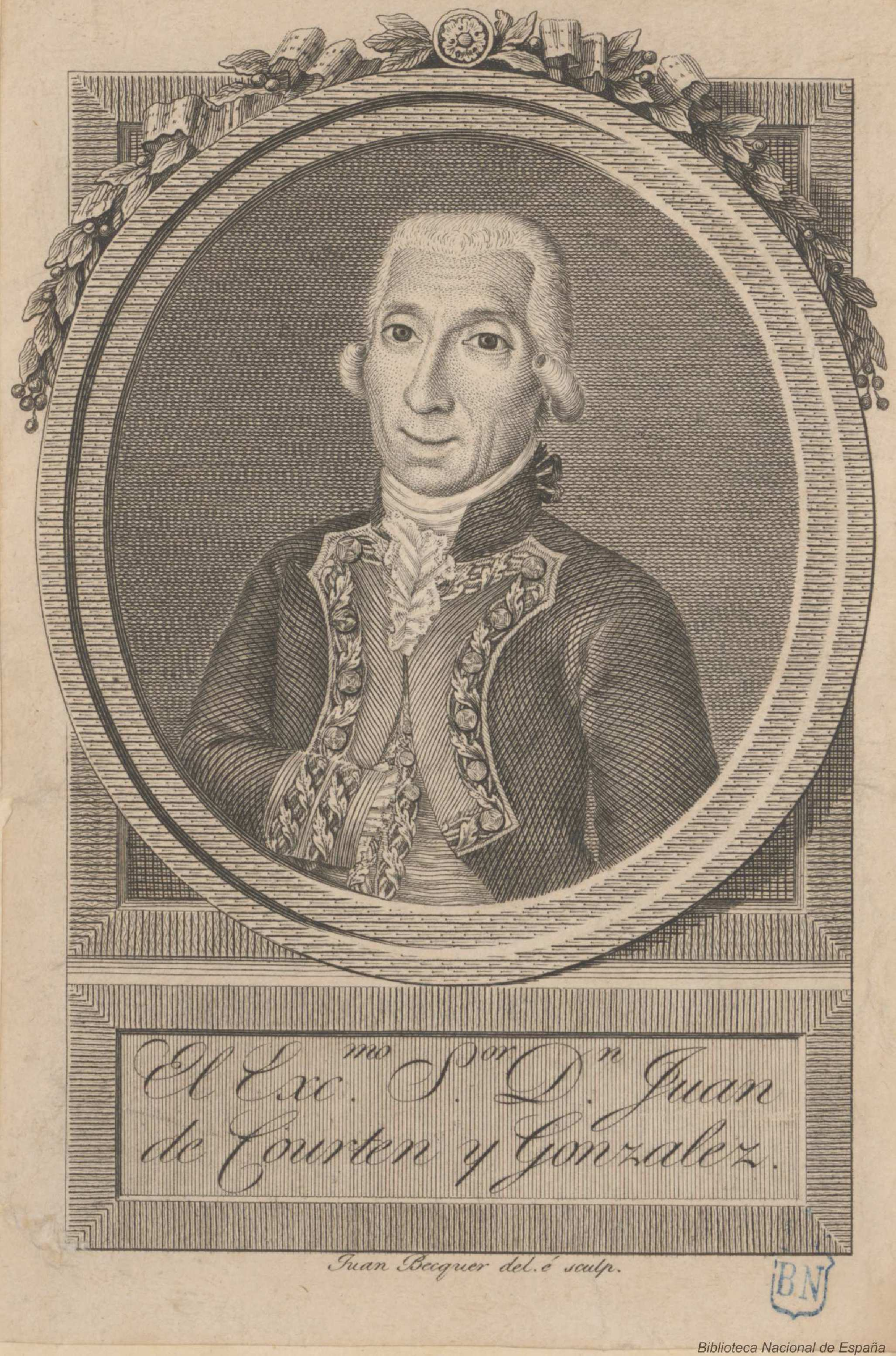
Juan de Courten

Ricardos planned to attack the French position at Villelongue-dels-Monts at dawn on 7 December 1793. To this end, he reinforced Juan de Courten at Montesquieu-des-Albères up to 8,000 men. De Courten's troops advanced with great secrecy. By coincidence, on the same night, the French garrison at Villelongue planned to assault Montesquieu. So, the two opposing forces, 3,000 French and 5,000 Spanish, passed each other in the night. Nobody had bothered to inform Doppet what was going on, but he had learned from some Spanish prisoners what was afoot. He sent a warning to the Villelongue garrison, but it was completely disregarded.

At 6:00 am, Courten's force, split into four columns, overran the French outposts and rushed the Villelongue position in a bayonet charge. The French soldiers, seeing their escape route being cut off by Spanish cavalry, bolted for the Brouilla ford across the Tech. Some of the men threw away their weapons and did not stop running until they reached Perpignan. Hearing the sound of fighting, Doppet sent out a column to distract his foes but only later did he find the fugitives from the morning action. In this action, the Spanish sustained a loss of only 56 killed and wounded out of 8,000 soldiers engaged. The French had 10,000 men and 40 guns involved and lost 340 killed and wounded, 312 missing, 26 guns, and 2,000 muskets.

The Committee of Public Safety ordered Doppet to keep only 15,000 new recruits and send his best soldiers as reinforcements to the Siege of Toulon. This impossible order was soon canceled, but 6,000 recruits from the Toulouse camp were sent under Charles-Pierre Augereau. These men arrived after the siege concluded, but their good appearance and discipline were praised. Meanwhile, the French army was ravaged by a disease that ultimately sent 10,000 men to the hospitals.

Doppet planned to withdraw his weakened army to the Camp of the Union near Perpignan. In order to cover the rearward movement of his heavy artillery, Doppet decided to mount an attack on the Portuguese garrison of Villelongue. The representatives authorized this mission, but entrusted it to d'Aoust. There were 2,000 French divided into two columns under Pierre Francois Sauret and Jean-Jacques de Laterrade. Included were 500 elite grenadiers and chasseurs led by Lannes. Though his wounded arm was still in a sling, his superior, Anne Charles Basset Montaigu asked Lannes to lead the elite troops and he agreed. The initial rush of both main columns was stopped, but Pierre Banel and Jean Joseph Guieu led their troops through the gorge of the redoubt, and it was captured. Lannes' men seized the main redoubt after the other field fortifications were taken. The entire Villelongue camp was overrun and, as Phipps wrote, "the Portuguese garrison massacred". The victors brought away 15 guns as trophies. Meanwhile, Doppet was stationed at Elne with instructions to advance when he saw signal rockets. Doppet waited in vain for the signal, but d'Aoust later claimed that he lost the rockets. Villelongue was defended by the 1st Oporto Portuguese Infantry Regiment.

== Aftermath ==
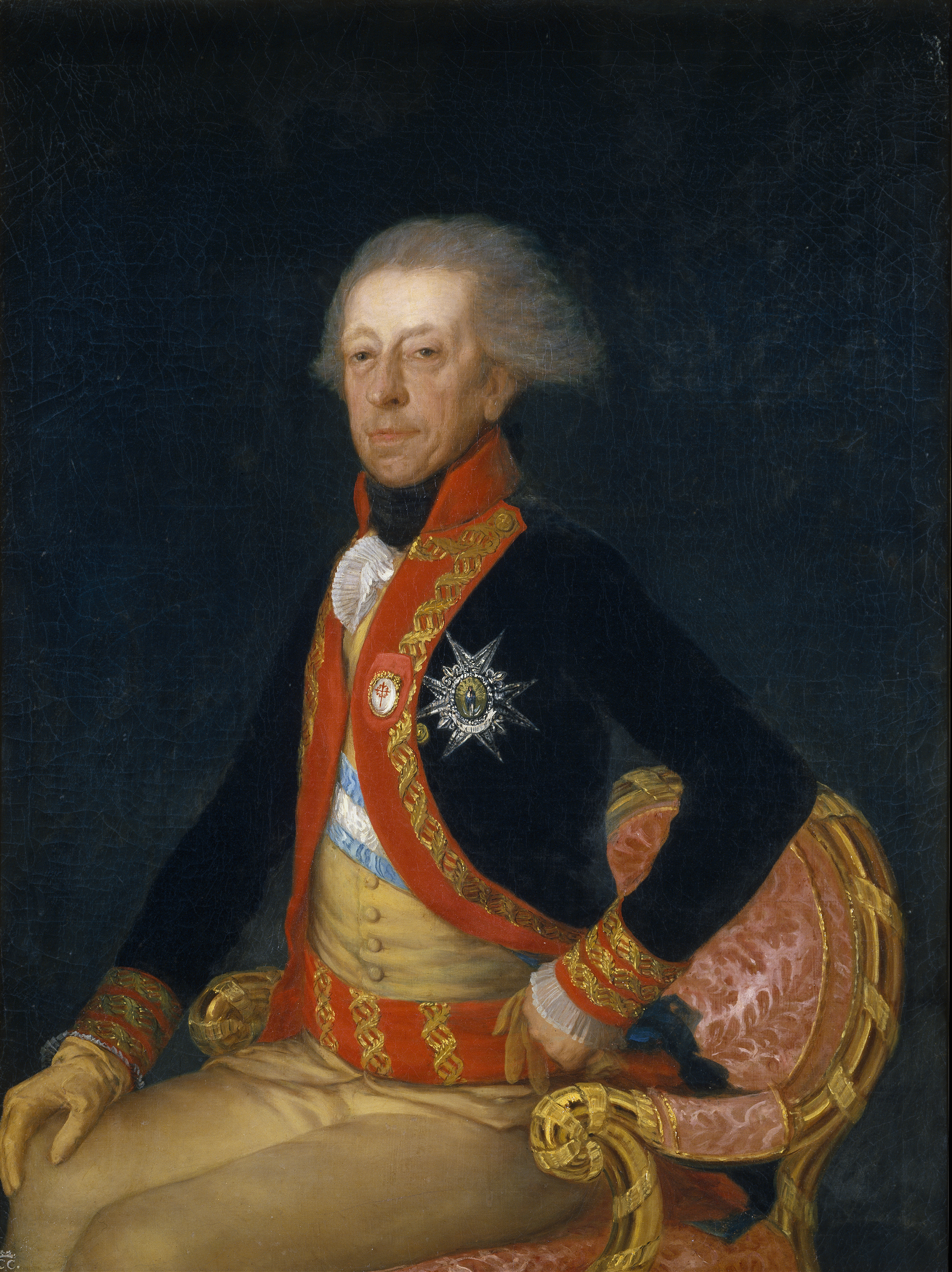
Antonio Ricardos

Suffering from the same fever that was causing havoc among his soldiers, Doppet resigned his command on 20 December and went to Perpignan to recover. D'Aoust was appointed interim army commander on 21 December 1793. Meanwhile, on 20 December, the Spanish won a victory at the Battle of Collioure, wiping out 4,000 of the 5,000 men in Delattre's division and capturing 100 guns at the cost of only 300 casualties. After the successful 7 December attack, Ricardos moved Courten's division to Espolla, and on 14 December launched it against Collioure. Gregorio García de la Cuesta took command of the division and successfully seized Fort Saint-Elme, Port-Vendres, and Collioure. On 22 December, Ricardos followed the Collioure coup with a general attack on the French army, which was withdrawing to Perpignan. Ricardos' army nearly trapped their fleeing adversaries, but Catherine-Dominique de Pérignon's brigade held off the Portuguese pursuit long enough for most of the French to reach Perpignan. However, d'Aoust's army still lost 7,700 men and 23 guns.

Fabre was killed during the Collioure debacle and Delattre was later executed for his defeat. On 25 December 1793, Pérignon and Augereau each received a promotion to general of division and Lannes was promoted to colonel adjutant general. D'Aoust was replaced in army command by Jacques François Dugommier on 16 January 1794. The French National Convention voted to rebuke the Army of the Eastern Pyrenees because it was the only army that failed to win victories over France's enemies. This was ironic because it was the National Convention's own representatives-on-mission which had interfered so badly with the army's operations. D'Aoust hoped that his 18 December victory would save him, but he was later executed.
