= First Battle of Boulou =

Event during the War of the Pyrenees

Coordinates: 41°31′29″N 2°49′51″E

- Part of War of the Pyrenees
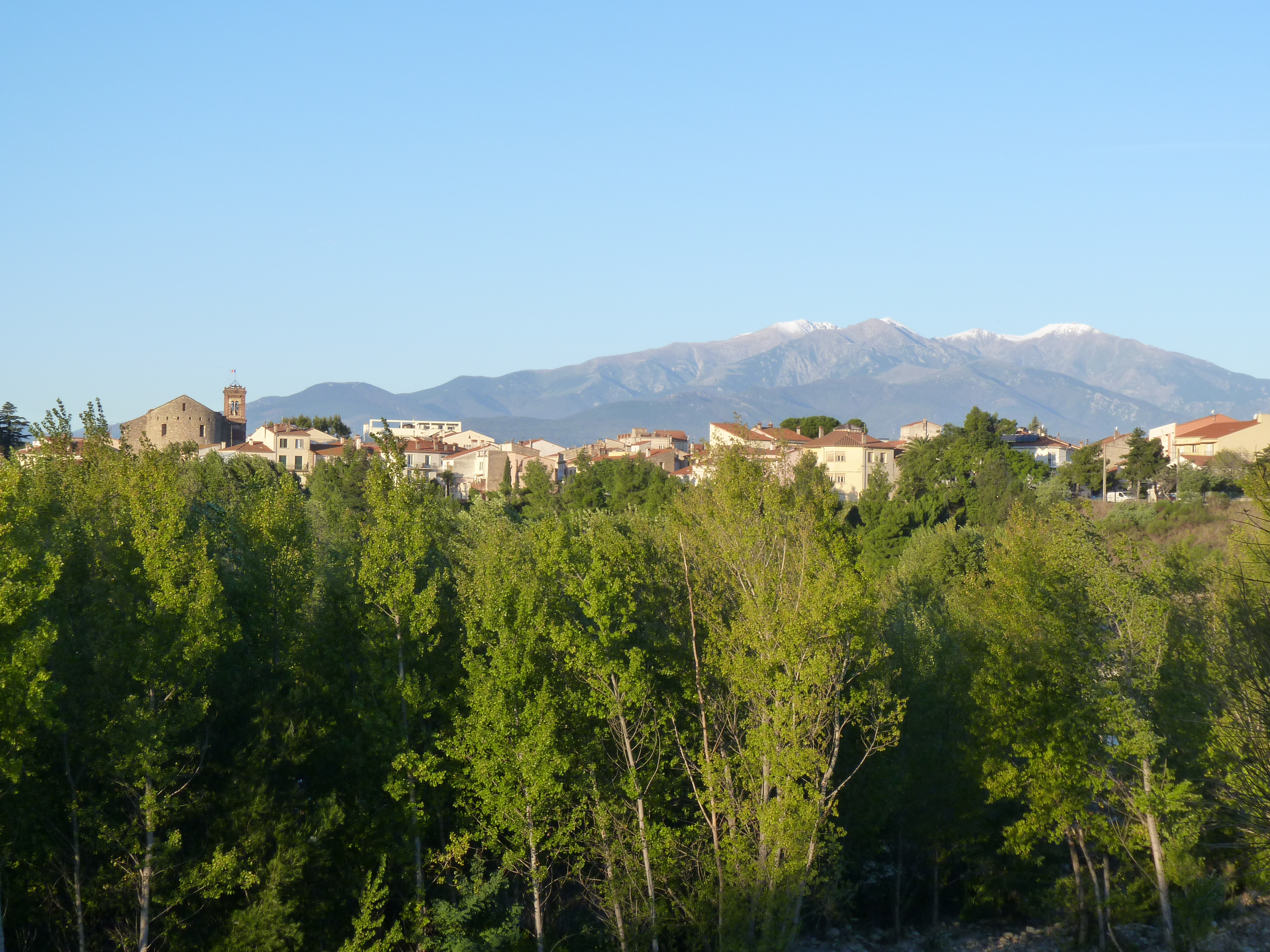
- Photograph of Le Boulou from the north shows the Pyrenees in the background.
Date	3–4 and 14–15 October 1793
Location	Le Boulou, Pyrénées-Orientales, France
Result	Spanish victory

Belligerents
Spain	France

Commanders and leaders
(Spain) Antonio Ricardos	(France) Eustache d'Aoust

Units involved
(Spain) Army of Catalonia	(France) Army of the Eastern Pyrenees

Strength
15,000	16,000

Casualties and losses
300	1,200

The First Battle of Boulou (3–4 October and 14–15 October 1793) saw a Republican French army led by Eustache Charles d'Aoust attack a Spanish Royal army commanded by Antonio Ricardos. Despite winning a recent victory over the French, Ricardos fell back to the Tech River valley where he had his troops construct a fortified camp. On 3–4 October, the Spanish army successfully defended its camp at Le Boulou against several French assaults. After a French night attack on 14–15 October against the Pla-del-Rey entrenchments also failed, d'Aoust withdrew his forces, having suffered disproportionate losses. D'Aoust was soon replaced in army command by a new leader.

== Background ==
The French Republic declared war on the Kingdom of Spain on 9 March 1793. The Spanish army of Ricardos invaded France on 17 April and quickly seized Céret in the Tech valley. On 20 May, the Spanish routed a French force at the Battle of Mas Deu. At this point, Ricardos chose to begin the Siege of Bellegarde which granted the French commander of the Army of the Eastern Pyrenees, Louis-Charles de Flers six weeks to whip his raw recruits into shape. On 17 July, Flers' rookies defeated the attack of Ricardos' Spanish army in the Battle of Perpignan. Nevertheless, the all-powerful representatives-on-mission deposed Flers and appointed Hilarion Paul Puget de Barbantane to replace him. Flers was eventually guillotined in the Reign of Terror.

Meanwhile, Ricardos established four fortified camps surrounding Perpignan, causing Barbantane to panic and abandon the army. On 17 September 1793, d'Aoust, commanding the troops at Perpignan and Jacques Gilles Henri Goguet, leading the division at Salses-le-Château combined to win the Battle of Peyrestortes, capturing the most menacing of the Spanish camps. Two days later, Luc Siméon Auguste Dagobert arrived at Perpignan with his division from the Cerdagne and took command of the army. On 22 September 1793, Dagobert carried out an unsuccessful attack on one of the Spanish camps in the Battle of Truillas. Worried about the French recapture of Villefranche and his exposed left flank, Ricardos ordered a retreat to the Tech valley, where he built an entrenched camp at Le Boulou. Ricardos asked for permission to withdraw to the border, but the royal court ordered him to hold his position. A 6,000-man Portuguese division under John Forbes was dispatched to his assistance.

The continual changes in command of the Army of the Eastern Pyrenees caused great disorganization. It was hard to understand who was actually responsible for the actions of the army when one considers how much the representatives-on-mission interfered with operations. The degree to which the representatives-on-mission ruled the army was extraordinary. Representative Claude Dominique Côme Fabre declared that the office of commander-in-chief of the army should be suppressed. Raymond Gaston asserted, "I know neither generals nor special powers. As to the Minister, he is like a dog on a racecourse. I alone should command here, and I shall be obeyed." Representative Joseph Cassanyès played an important role at Peyrestortes. Jealous of his colleague, Fabre tried to exert an equal influence in the planning before Truillas. After Truillas, Dagobert planned a new operation, but the representatives stopped him. Infuriated with their interference, Dagobert resigned command of the army and went back to the Cerdagne with his division. D'Aoust was given provisional command of the army on 29 September. The French government appointed Louis Marie Turreau to lead the army, but he would not arrive until 11 October.

== Battle ==
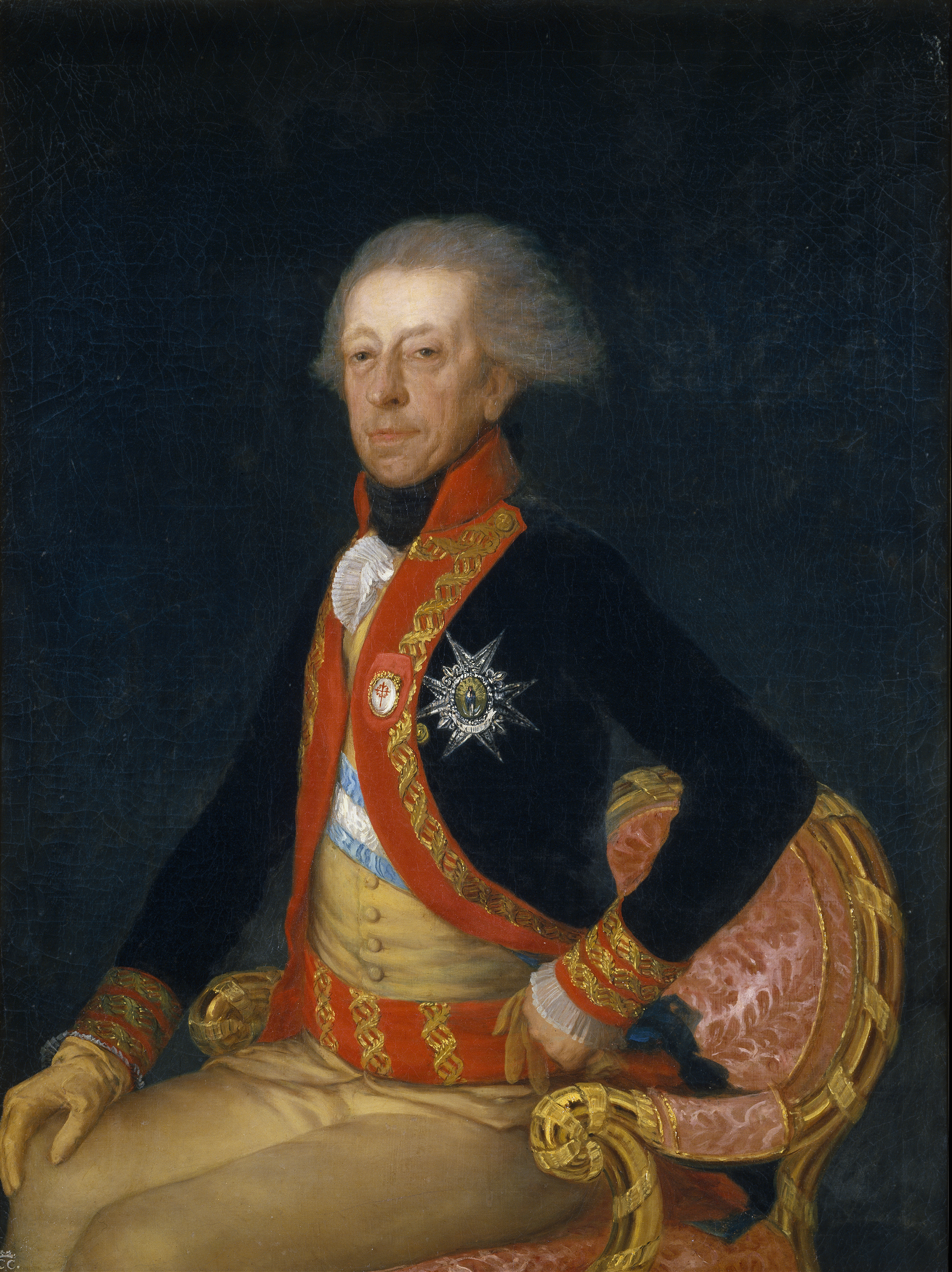
Antonio Ricardos

On 3 October 1793, d'Aoust ordered an assault on the Spanish entrenched camp at Le Boulou. The attack was repulsed by the soldiers led by Juan Miguel de Vives. On 4 October, the troops of Francisco Solano defeated a French attack on a different part of the camp. On 11 October, Turreau arrived from his former posting with the Army of the Coasts of La Rochelle to take command. He found that the representatives had written a letter to the War Minister asking him to keep Turreau in the Vendée. The representatives urged Turreau to let d'Aoust complete the operation that he started. Turreau was appalled at the way the representatives had usurped control of the army and was determined not to become their pawn. Since the government had failed to send formal notice of his appointment, Turreau decided to merely act as an observer.

Around midnight on 14–15 October 1793, d'Aoust assaulted the Spanish position of Pla-del-Rey which was defended by Francisco Taranco y Llano and four Spanish battalions. Though outnumbered, Taranco capably defended the position. A simultaneous French attack was directed at the Spanish right flank held by Juan de Courten's soldiers. Believing that the French were making their main effort against Pla-del-Rey, Ricardos only reinforced Courten with the Walloon Guards and some cavalry. Courten's troops repulsed seven separate charges against their position before the French admitted defeat. The worst fighting occurred at a position called the Batterie du Sang (Battery of Blood). D'Aoust ordered an artillery bombardment of the Le Boulou camp for two or three days. When this failed to have any effect on the defenders, d'Aoust authorized a retreat. Jean Lannes, future Marshal of France, was promoted captain of grenadiers on 21 October, probably as a result of this action.

== Aftermath ==
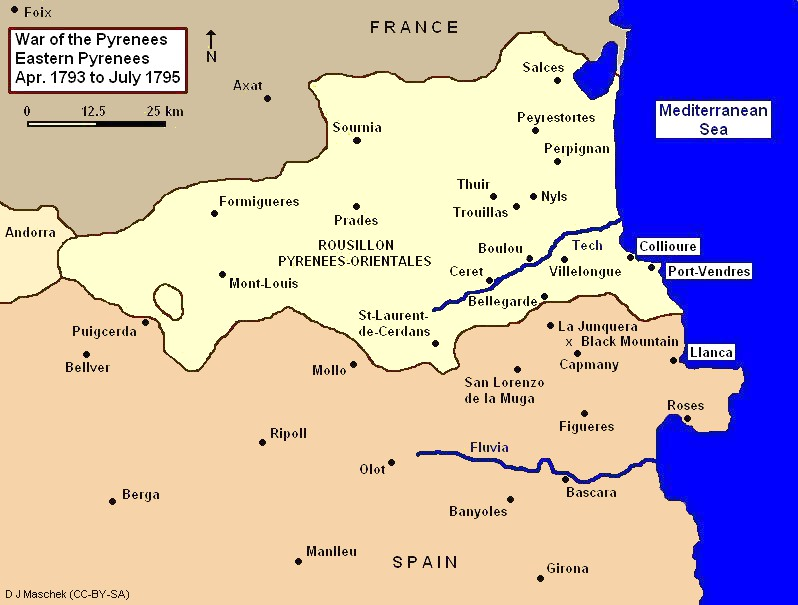
War of the Pyrenees, Eastern Pyrenees

The French suffered casualties of 400 killed and 800 wounded out of a total of 16,000 men engaged. In addition, 1,500 men deserted the army. Spanish losses were only 300 killed and wounded out of a strength of 15,000.

Next, Fabre proposed an expedition across the Pyrenees to strike at the port of Roses, while the expedition would first attack the Spanish town of Espolla. Both Dagobert and Turreau disliked this plan. Turreau consented to allow d'Aoust to lead the project, hoping that it would convince the Spanish to retreat to their side of the border. Turreau explained to the government that, after this operation, he would assume full control of the army. If, however, Fabre wanted the army to winter in Spain, Turreau promised to resign. On 26 October 1793, d'Aoust and three brigade-sized columns under Bertrand Clausel, Louis Pierre Delattre, and Raymond set out. Only Delattre's column reached Espolla where he found the Spanish garrison fully alert and the French were chased back across the frontier. To distract the Spanish, Dagobert's troops had been ordered from the Cerdagne to Thuir. From there, the French advanced south and occupied Céret, but Spanish counterattacks soon forced them to abandon it.

Turreau found that the representatives-on-mission were plotting another invasion of Spain. He called a council of war at which he and Dagobert opposed it. The representatives accused Dagobert of treason and suspended him on 17 November, whereupon he traveled to Paris. There Dagobert complained to the Committee of Public Safety, "Are the plans of Fabre and Gaston like the Ark of the Lord which one cannot touch with one's finger without being struck dead?" Turreau requested a transfer and on 3 November 1793 his wish was granted when the Committee nominated François Amédée Doppet to command the army. On 22 November, the representatives again named their favorite d'Aoust as the provisional army commander. On 29 November Doppet arrived, but he would only exercise nominal command until 20 December. The next action would be the Battle of Villelongue on 7 December.

== Locations of interest ==
- Pla-del-Rey
