= Battle of Collioure =

Battle of the War of the First Coalition

Coordinates: 42°31′36″N 03°04′53″E

- Part of the War of the Pyrenees
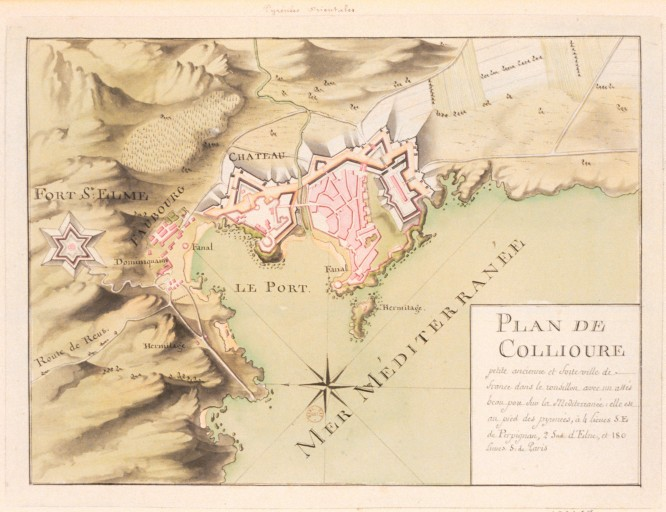
- Map of Collioure in the 18th century
Date	20–23 December 1793
Location	Collioure, Pyrénées Orientales, France
Result	Spanish victory

Belligerents
Spain	(French First Republic) France

Commanders and leaders
(Spain) Antonio Ricardos (Spain) Gregorio Cuesta	(French First Republic) François Doppet (French First Republic) Eustache d'Aoust (French First Republic) Louis Delattre

Units involved
Army of Catalonia	Army of the Eastern Pyrenees

Strength
8,000	5,000

Casualties and losses
300	4,000, 100 guns

The Battle of Collioure (20–23 December 1793) saw troops from Spain attack a French division during the War of the Pyrenees. The Spanish troops led by Gregorio García de la Cuesta were completely successful in ousting the French under Louis Pierre François Delattre from Collioure, Fort Saint-Elme and Port-Vendres. The contending sides were the Spanish Army of Catalonia commanded by Antonio Ricardos and the French Army of the Eastern Pyrenees led by François Amédée Doppet and Eustache Charles d'Aoust. In September 1793, the French successfully defended Perpignan from Spanish attack but December saw a series of French defeats. One of the French representatives on mission, Claude Dominique Côme Fabre was killed during the fighting at Collioure. Aoust and Delattre were arrested, condemned and executed by guillotine for the disaster.

== Background ==
In the year 1793 the Army of the Eastern Pyrenees suffered from the attentions of overbearing representatives on mission. While these political agents exercised enormous powers over the military leaders, they probably abused their authority in this army more than in any other. Claude Dominique Côme Fabre called commanders-in-chief useless and wanted the rank done away with. His colleague Raymond Gaston declared, "I know neither generals nor special powers ... I alone should command here and I shall be obeyed." Louis-Charles de Flers was appointed commander on 14 May 1793 and was dismissed on 6 August. Flers was arrested and executed by guillotine on 22 July 1794. Hilarion Paul Puget de Barbantane was commander from 7 August to 11 September. Terrified by the maneuvers of Spanish commander Antonio Ricardos, he abandoned his army and fled to Narbonne where he resigned his command. Though thrown in prison, Barbantane managed to escape the Reign of Terror. In the Battle of Peyrestortes on 17 September, the leaderless army scored a victory thanks to Generals Eustache Charles d'Aoust and Jacques Gilles Henri Goguet and Representative Joseph Cassanyes.

On 18 September Luc Siméon Auguste Dagobert was appointed commander. Ricardos defeated Dagobert at the Battle of Truillas on 21 September, though the Spanish afterward retreated to the Tech River valley. After clashing with the representatives, Dagobert resigned and returned to his division in the Cerdagne. On 29 September the representatives chose Aoust as temporary commander. The new commander Louis Marie Turreau finally arrived on 11 October and was aghast at the way the representatives ordered around the generals. The representatives did not like Turreau and asked to the Minister of War to recall him. Because of a missed communication between the War Office and army headquarters, Turreau decided to allow Aoust to continue in acting command while he sat on the sidelines and wrote complaining letters to his political friends. Several unsuccessful attacks were made on the Spanish positions in October.

Turreau's application for transfer finally came through and the representatives named Aoust temporary commander from 22 November. François Amédée Doppet assumed command of the army on 28 November. Doppet found the army in a terrible state, the men badly equipped and the horses and mules dying from lack of feed. The representatives practically ignored Doppet, issuing orders without informing him of the actions of his own units. On 6 December, Doppet received information that the Spanish planned to attack Villelongue-dels-Monts the next day and tried to warn the garrison. Paying no heed to their commander, the defenders set out to attack the Spanish. The result was a fiasco; the French were routed and the Spanish captured Villelongue.

In order to break contact with the enemy and draw his army back into winter quarters, Doppet planned an attack on Villelongue. The representatives chose Aoust to lead the assault, which was launched on the evening of 18 December and was a success. Jean Lannes, Pierre Banel, Jean Joseph Guieu and Pierre Francois Sauret were involved in the fighting in which heavy losses were inflicted on the Portuguese garrison and 15 guns were seized. On 20 December, Doppet became ill in the same epidemic that would sicken or kill 10,000 soldiers. He did not recover for two and a half months and was replaced by Aoust.

== Battle ==
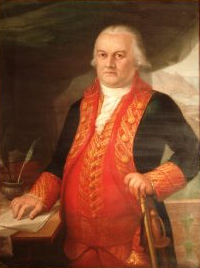
Gregorio de la Cuesta

After his success on 7 December 1793, Ricardos planned to evict the French from the coastal towns, Collioure and Port-Vendres. He sent the division of Juan de Courten to the south side of the Pyrenees at Espolla. While José de Iturrigaray and the Spanish cavalry distracted the enemy near Argelès-sur-Mer, Courten was ordered to attack the French position near the Coll de Banyuls (Banyuls Pass). On 14 December the attack was made by six or seven columns that each crossed the Pyrenees by different passes. The attempt was a success and Delattre's troops were compelled to abandon their positions after the Spanish captured 300 French soldiers and 20 field pieces. This action forced Delattre's division into a narrow corridor along the coast. Gregorio García de la Cuesta replaced Courten in command a few days later. The new commander saw that Collioure could be approached by three defiles through rough terrain.

Delattre deployed his men on a ridge covering both Collioure and Port-Vendres. Cuesta formed his troops into columns under Castrillo, Ortig and Solano and attacked. All three columns broke through, the French defenders fleeing in the direction of their coastal forts. As the retreating French approached Fort Saint-Elme and Port-Vendres, both places shut their gates, refusing to admit the soldiers. Fort Saint-Elme even fired on them. Feeling betrayed, large numbers of men surrendered to the pursuing Spanish troops. Saint-Elme's traitorous commander immediately surrendered the fort as soon as Solano summoned it. Ortig called for the surrender of Port-Vendres and it also capitulated. The remaining French troops sought refuge in Collioure or tried to break out by fighting their way north along the coast. Delattre escaped but Fabre was killed, dying bravely at the front of one of the columns. Cuesta sent three battalions to approach Collioure at night with torches, threatening to burn the place. It surrendered as well. The date of the battle is unclear. Two sources stated that the engagement happened on 20 December. Another authority asserted that the fighting occurred on the 21st. A final source put the date of Collioure's surrender as 23 December.

== Results ==
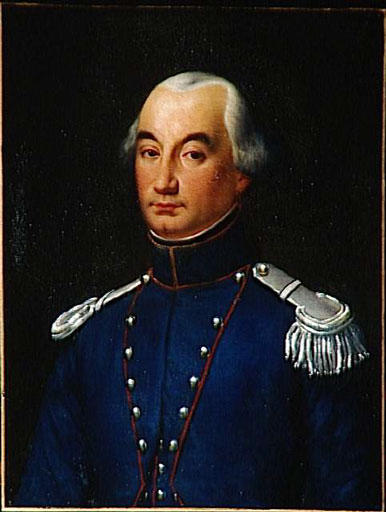
Dominique Pérignon

The French suffered losses of 4,000 men killed, wounded or captured out of a total of 5,000. Between the army and the coastal forts the Spanish captured 100 artillery pieces. Cuesta's 8,000-man force sustained only 300 casualties. Hearing of the collapse of his left wing, Aoust ordered a retreat toward Perpignan on 21 December. The Army of Catalonia rushed in pursuit, Ricardos sending his cavalry across the Tech at Brouilla in an attempt to envelop the French from the east. Jerónimo Girón-Moctezuma, Marquis de las Amarillas pursued in the center with 6,000 Spanish troops while Portuguese general John Forbes with five battalions closed in menacingly from the west. In the crisis, Catherine-Dominique de Pérignon's brigade blocked the Portuguese at Saint-Luc, causing Ricardos to hesitate and allowing the French to scramble to safety. Even so, the French lost 7,700 men and 23 guns before they reached a secure position at Perpignan (Note: The text suggested the 7,700 included the losses at Collioure, but was not specific.) and its entrenched Camp de l'Union. There were only 8,000 soldiers left with the colors.

Since all the other French armies had been successful by the end of 1793, the National Convention issued a decree criticizing the Army of the Eastern Pyrenees. Aoust, who became the army commander just as the disaster struck, was recalled and later executed. He went to the guillotine on 2 July 1794. Delattre was executed the same day. January 1794 brought huge changes. The new French commander Jacques François Dugommier came with 10,500 troops after successfully concluding the Siege of Toulon in December. Ricardos died on 13 March 1794, allegedly from a cup of poisoned chocolate. His freshly appointed replacement Alejandro O'Reilly died of a stomach ailment ten days later. Finally, Luis Firmín de Carvajal, Conde de la Unión was named the new leader of the Army of Catalonia.

== Notes ==
Footnotes

Citations
