= Banel =

Banel may refer to:

== People ==
- Bănel Nicoliță (born 1985), Romanian professional footballer
- Jaydon Banel (born 2004), Dutch professional footballer
- Pierre Banel (1766-1796), Brigade commander during the French Revolutionary Wars

== Others ==
- Banel & Adama, French-Malian Senegalese romantic drama film
