= Gregorio García de la Cuesta =

Spanish army officer (1741–1811)

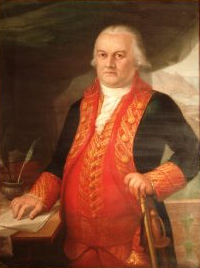
- Born: Gregorio García de la Cuesta y Fernández de Celis; 9 May 1741
- Died: 25 November 1811 (aged 70); Palma de Mallorca
- Military career
- Allegiance: Spain
- Conflicts: Spanish invasion of Portugal (1762); Siege of Almeida (1762); American Revolutionary War; Great Siege of Gibraltar; War of the Pyrenees; Battle of Perpignan; Battle of Peyrestortes; Battle of Collioure; Battle of Bascara; Peninsular War; Battle of Cabezón; Battle of Medina de Rioseco; Battle of Somosierra; Battle of Medellín; Battle of Talavera

Gregorio García de la Cuesta y Fernández de Celis (9 May 1741 – 25 November 1811) was a Spanish army officer and commander of Spain's forces at the beginning of the Peninsular War.

According to historian Charles Oman (1902):

Throughout the two years during which he held high command in the field, Gregorio de la Cuesta consistently displayed an arrogance and an incapacity far exceeding that of any other Spanish general.

== Early military career ==
Cuesta entered military service in 1758 as a cadet in the Toledo Infantry Regiment and was sent to Oran in June of that year, where he was stationed for the following four years. While there, he was promoted to sub-lieutenant of the Granada Infantry Regiment in 1762.

During the Spanish invasion of Portugal (1762), he distinguished himself at the siege and storming of Almeida, remaining as part of the garrison.

Between 1775 and 1777, Cuesta served as director of the Segovia Artillery Academy for Cadets and was commissioned on two occasions to raise troops in the province. In 1779 he was promoted to lieutenant colonel and transferred to participate in the siege of Gibraltar, where he remained for nineteen months, until the besieging French and Spanish forces withdrew.

== Later military career ==
=== Campaigns in Spanish America ===
In 1781, Cuesta was appointed sargento mayor (second in command to the regiment's colonel) of the Extremadura Regiment and sailed for Guárico (Venezuela). He subsequently spent 14 months in Santo Domingo preparing for the Spanish expedition to relieve Jamaica. From Santo Domingo, he was transferred to Havana, where his regiment, together with the Soria Regiment, sailed for Portobelo (present-day Panama) on their way to suppress the Rebellion of Túpac Amaru II in Peru. During the voyage, Cuesta participated in the rescue of five officers and 113 soldiers who had been shipwrecked in the Old Bahama Channel. On reaching Lima, he was stationed there for a year before being given command of the 2nd Battalion and assigned to maintain order in the provinces of the Peruvian interior. After crossing the Andes, he arrived at La Plata, where he suppressed an uprising of the local militia, an action for which he was commended by the viceroy.

While stationed at La Plata, he married a criolla, Nicolasa López Lispergué. In 1786, he was appointed lieutenant colonel of the Extremadura Regiment and president of the Real Audiencia de Charcas (appellate court), a position that also carried the captaincy general of the province. In 1788, he was sent to Buenos Aires and promoted to colonel the following year. He later requested, and was granted, command of his regiment following the death of his superior officer, Mateo Milanés.

On his return to mainland Spain in 1791, his regiment was stationed at the garrison in Badajoz.

=== Campaigns in Europe ===
==== War of the Pyrenees ====
Cuesta led his regiment in the capture of the towns of Cabestany and Bernet before taking part in the Battle of Perpignan, where he was wounded. Following the Battle of Peyrestortes in September 1793, he was promoted to brigadier.

Appointed second-in-command to the captain general of Catalonia, Luis Fermín de Carvajal, Conde de la Unión, Cuesta led the assaults on Ceret and Sant Ferriol, for which he was promoted to field marshal. Towards the end of December 1793, he commanded 8,000 Spanish and Portuguese troops in a successful action at the Battle of Collioure, capturing Collioure, Fort Saint-Elme, and Port-Vendres. His force killed or captured 4,000 of the 5,000 defenders.

In March 1795, Cuesta was appointed governor of Girona. By May, however, he was back in the field, leading a division under José de Urrutia y de las Casas at the Battle of Bascara on 14 June 1795. His corps of 7,000–9,000 troops captured 1,500 French soldiers at Puigcerdà on 26 July. The following day, he took the town of Bellver with its 1,000-man garrison. Both actions took place after the Peace of Basel had been signed on 22 July 1795, though Cuesta was unaware of this at the time.

==== Interim years ====
With the war concluded, Cuesta returned to his post as governor of Girona. In September 1795, he was promoted to lieutenant general. In 1798, he was appointed captain general of Mallorca, assuming the post in July. Later that year, in October, he became captain general of New Castile and president of the Council of Castile, leaving Mallorca in November. His confrontations with Manuel Godoy, however, led to his dismissal and banishment to the province of Santander, where he lived on half-pay.

In March 1808, Cuesta was recalled from banishment by Ferdinand VII, who appointed him captain general of Galicia. He did not take up this role, as the following month he was instead appointed captain general of Old Castile. In June 1808, he was named viceroy of New Spain, though the French invasion of the Iberian Peninsula prevented him from assuming the position.

==== Peninsular War ====
When war with France broke out in 1808, Cuesta was 67 years old. Initially reluctant to lead the insurgents in Valladolid, he accepted after a gallows was erected outside his house and the local populace threatened to hang him if he refused. His hastily raised force of 5,000–7,000 volunteers was defeated at the Battle of Cabezón in June 1808, forcing him to retreat from Valladolid.

After combining his remaining forces with those of Lieutenant General Joaquín Blake and the Army of Galicia, Cuesta insisted on marching on Valladolid, leaving the combined force vulnerable to counterattack. The two generals were defeated at the Battle of Medina de Rioseco on 14 July, when Cuesta failed to close the gap between his troops and Blake's.

Following the sack of Bilbao by General Christophe Antoine Merlin on 16 August 1808, the Central Junta convened in Madrid to decide on a unified military command structure. Cuesta demanded appointment as Commander-in-Chief, but faced opposition from other commanders, particularly General Castaños, whose recent victory at the Battle of Bailén had elevated his standing. After failing to persuade Castaños to join him in forming a new government, Cuesta left the meeting. Shortly afterwards, he ordered the arrest of Antonio Valdés, president of the Junta Suprema of Galicia, and Joaquín Flórez-Osorio, president of the Junta Suprema of León, imprisoning them in the Alcázar of Segovia.

In response, the Central Junta, under the presidency of the Count of Floridablanca, relieved Cuesta of his command and had him arrested. His command was given to Juan Pignatelli. Following Napoleon's victory at the Battle of Somosierra in November 1808 and the fall of Madrid in December, popular demand in Extremadura pressed for Cuesta's reinstatement. Floridablanca reappointed him captain general of Extremadura at the end of the month. Cuesta pursued an offensive strategy as soon as he had raised a force, achieving some early successes, but was decisively defeated at the Battle of Medellín in March 1809, where he lost half his army and was wounded.

In June 1809, Cuesta was appointed captain general of New Castile. He subsequently joined forces with a British Army contingent under Arthur Wellesley. Relations between Cuesta and his British allies were strained, though they fought together at the Battle of Talavera on 28 July 1809, a coalition victory for which Wellesley was elevated to Viscount Wellington. Cuesta, for his part, was awarded the Grand Cross of Carlos III by the Central Junta.

Despite this success, Cuesta resigned his command in December 1809. Shortly thereafter, he suffered a stroke in Badajoz and was evacuated for medical treatment to Seville, Málaga, and later Mallorca as French forces advanced. He arrived in Palma in May 1810 and, in January 1811, assumed the captaincy general of the Balearic Islands and the presidency of the Real Audiencia. During this time, he clashed with Samuel Whittingham, a British cavalry officer who had served alongside him at Medellín and Talavera, as well as with Bernardo Nadal, Bishop of Mallorca, who submitted reports requesting Cuesta's dismissal.

While in Mallorca, Cuesta published a manifesto defending his actions during the Peninsular War.
