= Jean François Carteaux =

French painter

Jean Baptiste François Carteaux
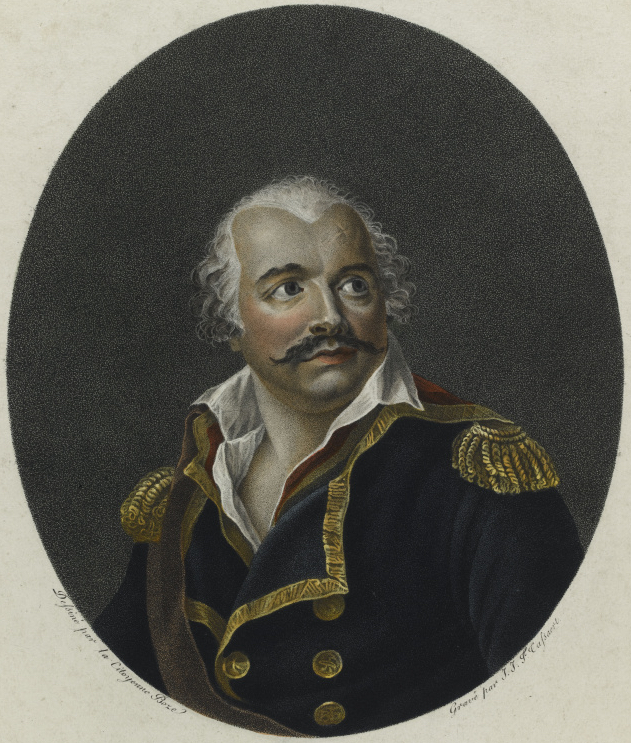
- Born: 31 January 1751
- Died: 12 April 1813 (aged 62)
- Military career
- Allegiance: French First Republic
- Branch: French Revolutionary Army
- Service years: c. 1793
- Rank: Général
- Conflicts: Siege of Toulon (1793); War in the Vendée

Jean Baptiste François Carteaux (French pronunciation: [ʒɑ̃ batist fʁɑ̃swa kaʁto]; 31 January 1751 – 12 April 1813) was a French painter who became a General in the French Revolutionary Army. He is notable chiefly for being the young Napoleon Bonaparte's commander at the siege of Toulon in 1793.

== History ==
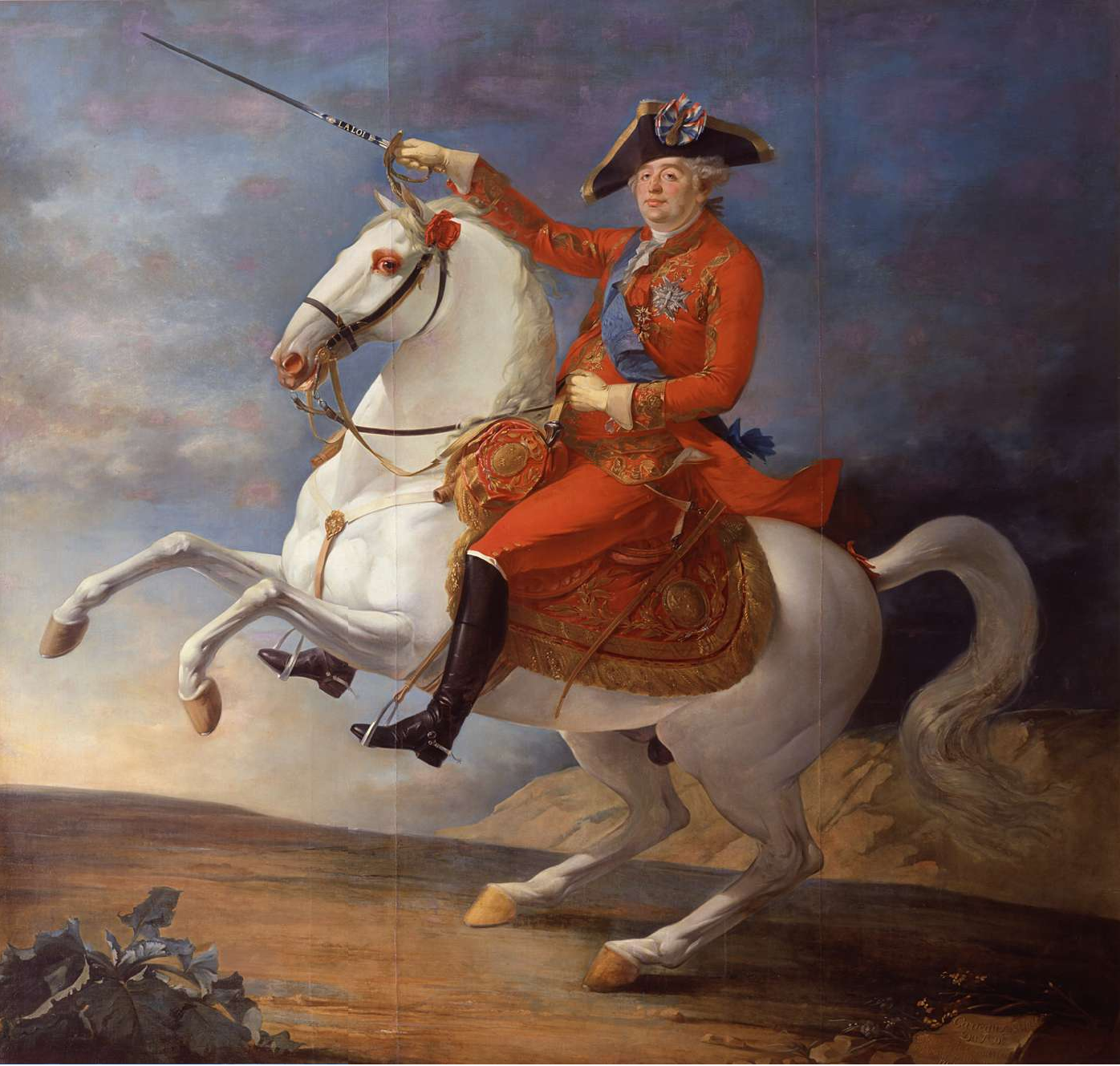
Louis XVI as a citizen-king, painting by Carteaux

Born in 1751, Carteaux followed the career of a painter, producing several works including a portrait of King Louis XVI on horseback.

Following the French Revolution, he became a General and given a command of the Army of the Alps, despite the fact he had received no military training. Soon after his arrival, Carteaux was given the task of defeating a force of royalist Provençal rebels. On 16 July 1793 he succeeded in defeating the small rebel force.

In early August 1793, Carteaux was ordered to Marseille which had risen in revolt against the extreme Jacobins. He first recaptured Avignon and then after a rebellion in the city, Marseille. He was then given command of the efforts to recapture the vital port of Toulon. The citizens of Toulon had not only openly rebelled, but had granted the British and Spanish fleets access to the harbour. On 25 August Carteaux began the siege of Toulon. Carteaux handled the siege ineptly, concentrating his efforts on the relatively unimportant town of Ollioules. During these battles, Carteaux's artillery commander, Elzéar Auguste Cousin de Dommartin, was severely wounded and the Army was left with no capable artillery commander. Despite this, Carteaux focused his efforts on the construction of a battery in a gully near Ollioules, which he imagined would be able to bring fire to bear on the Anglo-Neapolitan ships. Once the battery was completed, it became apparent that the harbour was beyond its range. On 8 September a 6,000 man detachment from the Armée d'Italie under the command of Jean François Cornu de La Poype arrived to the east of Toulon and began operations independently of Carteaux' force.

Seeing the lack of progress of Carteaux and the ineptitude of his artillery, the officials from the Committee of Public Safety, Augustin Robespierre and Antoine Christophe Saliceti designated the young Artillery captain Napoleon Bonaparte as Carteaux new artillery commander. With the backing of the all-powerful Robespierre and Saliceti, the dynamic Bonaparte quickly devised a plan for the capture of forts l'Eguillette and Balaguier. Bonaparte correctly surmised that the capture of these would allow accurate fire to be brought to bear on the Anglo-Neapolitan fleet and force it to abandon Toulon. Carteaux was not convinced and ordered a half-hearted attack under the command of Henri François Delaborde. This attack not only failed, it also brought the importance of the position to the attention of the Anglo-Neapolitans, who immediately began strengthening their positions.

Following this dismal failure, Carteaux allowed Bonaparte to begin construction of several batteries with which to bombard the newly reinforced Anglo-Neapolitan fortresses. Bonaparte virtually took control of the operation, despite Carteaux's protests that the army was his command. Late in October, Napoleon sent a letter to the Convention, complaining about the quality of his superiors, calling them a bunch of fools. As a result, Carteaux was relieved of his command on 11 November 1793 and for a while was imprisoned. He was replaced in rapid succession by La Poype and François Amédée Doppet who were then replaced by Jacques François Dugommier.

Despite his imprisonment, Carteaux survived the Reign of Terror and was later sent to fight in the War in the Vendée. When Bonaparte was elected First Consul, he appointed Carteaux as Administrator of the Loterie Royale de France. Carteaux died in 1813.

Military offices
Preceded by Pierre Jadart Dumerbion	Commander-in-chief of the Army before Toulon; 5 September–6 November 1793	Succeeded by Jean François Cornu de La Poype
Preceded by François Amédée Doppet	Commander-in-chief of the Army of the Alps; 18 November–22 December 1793	Succeeded by Thomas-Alexandre Dumas
