= Pierre Banel =

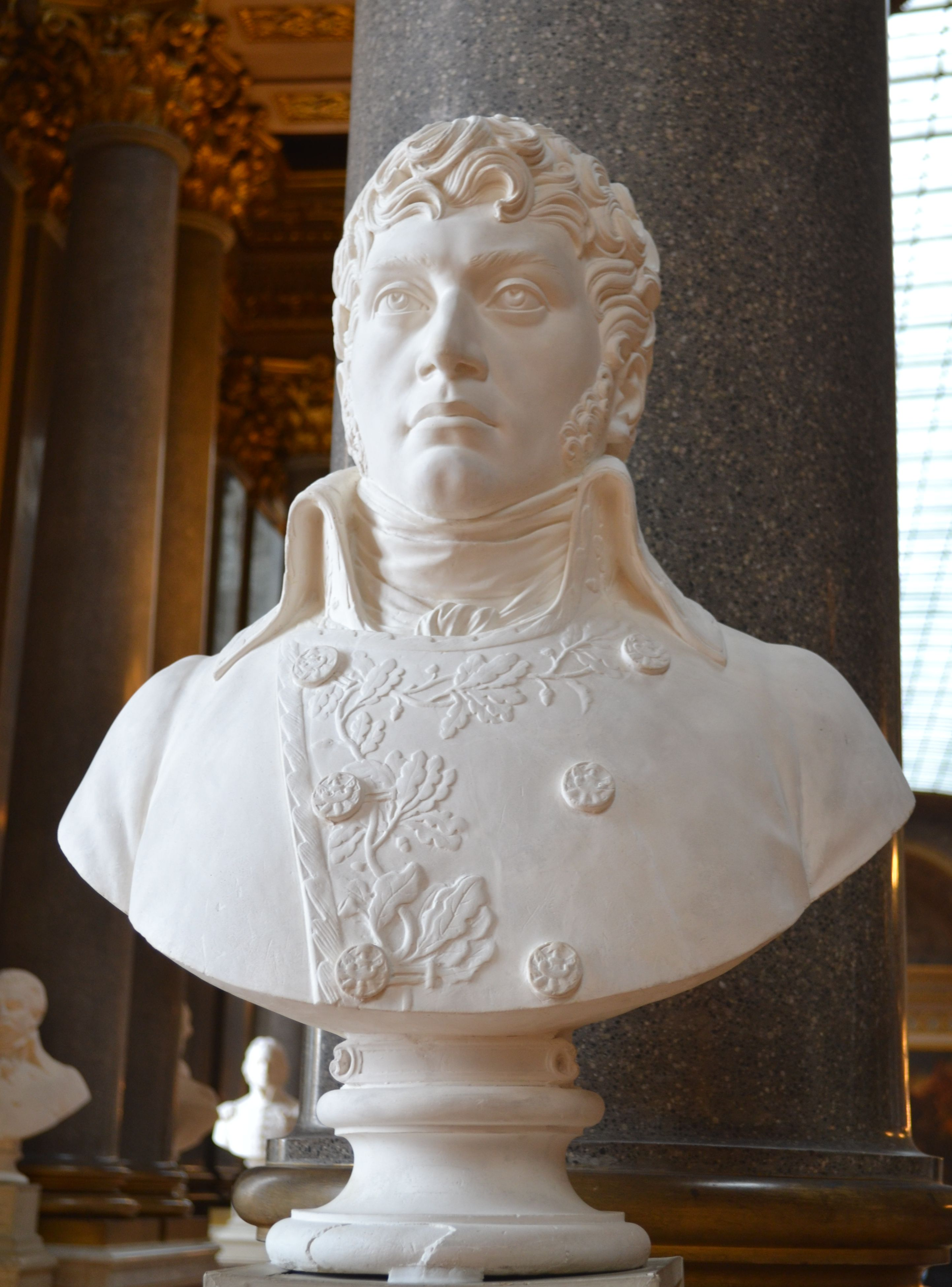
- This bust of Pierre Banel is located in the Galerie des Batailles, Palace of Versailles.
- Born: 30 July 1766; Lectoure, Gers, France
- Died: 13 April 1796 (aged 29) Cosseria, Italy
- Allegiance: Kingdom of France; France
- Branch: Infantry
- Service years: (Kingdom of France) 1784–1789 (France) 1792–1796
- Rank: General of Brigade
- Conflicts: War of the Pyrenees; Battle of Mas Deu; Battle of Peyrestortes; Battle of Truillas; Battle of Villelongue; Second Battle of Boulou; Battle of Black Mountain; War of the First Coalition; Battle of Loano; Battle of Millesimo †

Pierre Banel (French pronunciation: [pjɛʁ banɛl]; 30 July 1766 – 13 April 1796) became a brigade commander during the French Revolutionary Wars and was killed in action in Italy. He enlisted in the French Royal Army as a private in 1784 and quit military service in 1789. He joined a volunteer battalion as an adjutant-major in 1792 and fought in the War of the Pyrenees. He was promoted commander of a battalion in mid-1793 and general of brigade at the end of 1793. He fought against Spain at Mas Deu, Villelongue, Boulou, and Black Mountain. After transferring to Italy, he was wounded at Loano. Fighting under Napoleon Bonaparte, he was killed while leading his brigade to attack Cosseria Castle at the Battle of Millesimo. BANEL is one of the names inscribed under the Arc de Triomphe, on Column 28.

== Early career ==
Pierre Banel was born on 30 July 1766 at Lectoure, France. On 20 April 1784, he enlisted as a private in the Vintimille Infantry Regiment (later the 49th Regiment). He was promoted corporal on 17 June 1788, quartermaster on 6 January 1789, and sergeant on 16 June 1789. However, he left the Royal Army one month later on 17 July. He joined the 2nd Battalion of Gers Volunteers as an adjutant major on 20 June 1792. Aside from Banel, other soldiers from the 2nd Gers who became general officers were Jean Lannes and Joseph Lagrange. Lannes, who was appointed a Marshal of the Empire under Napoleon, was also from Lectoure.

== War of the Pyrenees ==
On 17–19 May 1793, Banel fought at the Battle of Mas Deu, serving with the left wing. On 1 June, Banel was confirmed as commander of the 7th Battalion of the Aude Volunteers in the Army of the Eastern Pyrenees. An order of battle from 1 September 1793 placed the 7th Aude at Salses-le-Château. This was where the division led by Jacques Gilles Henri Goguet was positioned at the start of the Battle of Peyrestortes on 17 September, which was a French victory. The Battle of Truillas, which followed on 21 September, was a French defeat. Banel was promoted chef de brigade (colonel) on 11 October. In the Battle of Villelongue on the night of 18 December 1793, the French overran a camp defended by Portuguese troops. At first, the two main attack columns were repulsed, but Colonels Banel and Jean Joseph Guieu led their soldiers to successfully capture an important redoubt. Banel was given a provisional promotion to general of brigade on 25 December 1793, though it was not confirmed until 13 June 1795.

Banel fought at the Second Battle of Boulou on 30 April–1 May 1794 where he was involved in the capture of Montesquiou. An order of battle for 17 November 1794 showed that Banel commanded a 2,174-man brigade in Charles-Pierre Augereau's division. The Battle of the Black Mountain on 17–20 November proved to be a major French victory in which Augereau's division made the main assault. The French captured 200 guns and inflicted over 8,000 Spanish casualties. It was followed by the surrender of the Sant Ferran fortress at Figueres with 9,107 soldiers and 171 guns.

== War of the First Coalition and death ==
The Peace of Basel on 22 July 1795 ended the war with Spain. A force of 10,000 men from the Army of the Eastern Pyrenees was sent to reinforce the Army of Italy, but because many of the soldiers deserted and others were reassigned, only half that number reached Italy by October 1795. The French won the Battle of Loano over the Kingdom of Sardinia-Piedmont and Habsburg Austria on 23–24 November 1795. According to an order of battle, Banel led one of the brigades in Augereau's division. On the morning of the first day, Banel's brigade seized Toirano and attacked an Austrian strongpoint called the Chartreuse. Banel was wounded and handed over command to Lannes, who led the 105th Infantry Regiment in the brigade. After the victory, many French soldiers became insubordinate because they were not properly fed or clothed. In January 1796, Augereau was able to remedy the situation and he asked his army commander Barthélemy Louis Joseph Schérer to write to brigade commanders Banel and Claude Perrin Victor to commend them for their soldiers' good discipline and appearance.

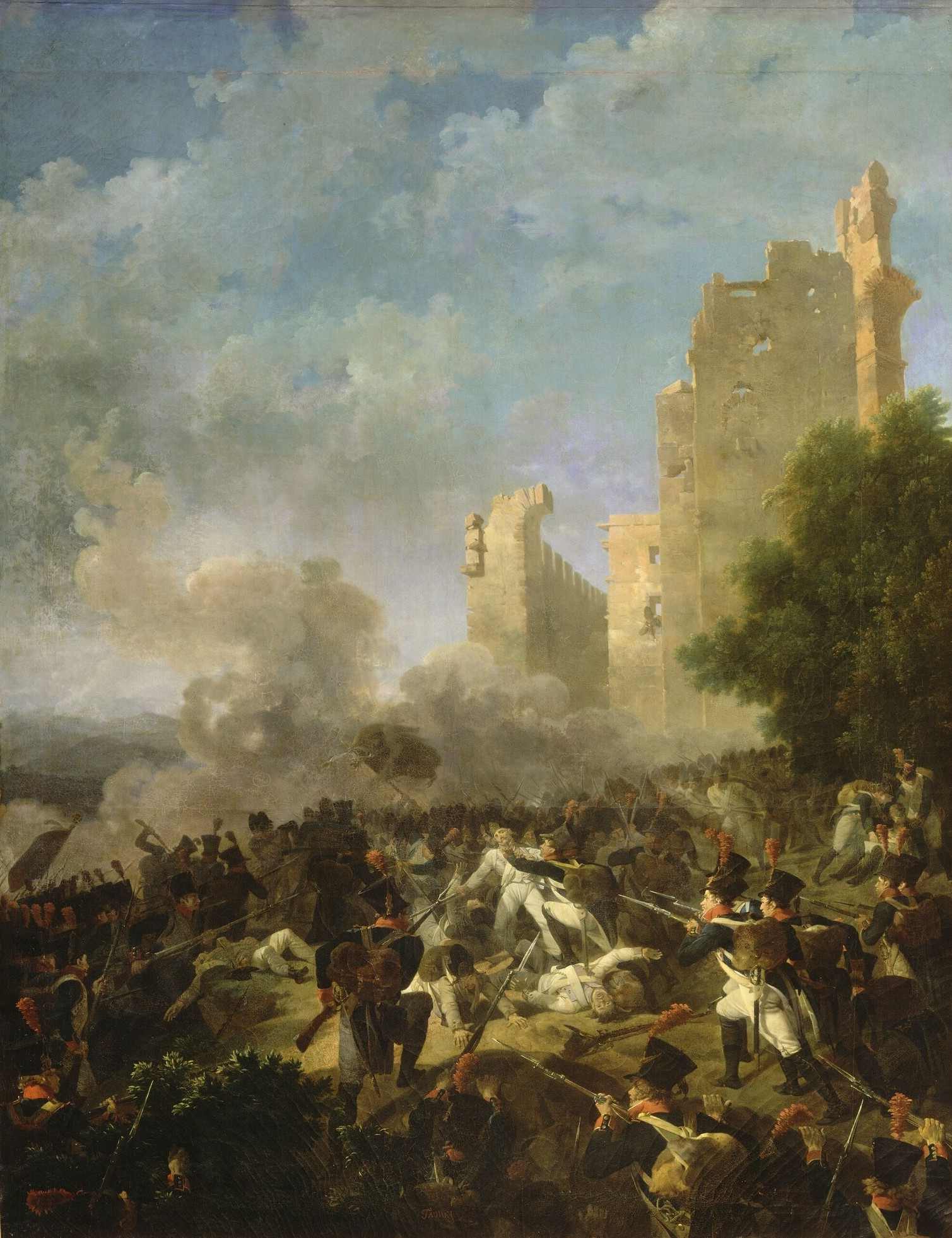
Assault on Cosseria Castle

On 5 March 1796, Banel's brigade consisted of 285 artillerymen, 28 Miners, and 5 troopers from the 7th Hussars plus the following infantry demi-brigades: 39th (928 men), 105th (912 men), 5th Provisional (494 men), 8th Light (596 men), and 18th Light (361 men). (Note: In spring 1796, the French army was reorganized by combining some of the old demi-brigades into new, renumbered demi-brigades. Therefore, the unit numbers from 5 March 1796 have no relation to the new unit numbers. In the account of the Battle of Millesimo, the 4th and 18th Line are the new numbers, while the 51st still had the old number (Boycott-Brown, p. 127).) On 27 March 1796, Napoleon Bonaparte replaced Schérer in command of the Army of Italy. On 13 April 1796 during the Montenotte Campaign, Augereau's division marched west toward Montezemolo and Ceva. The French encountered a thin line held by the Austrian force led by Feldmarschall-Leutnant Giovanni Marchese di Provera, including the Belgiojoso Infantry Regiment Nr. 44, the grenadier companies of the Strassoldo Infantry Regiment Nr. 27, and elements of the Gyulai Frei-Korps. A 569-man battalion of Sardinian grenadiers led by Colonel Filippo Del Caretto suddenly appeared and rushed to occupy Cosseria Castle, a medieval ruin. In the Battle of Millesimo, the French quickly drove off the rest of the Austrian covering force and surrounded the castle. Inside were 892 Sardinians and Austrians, including Provera. At 9:00 am, the French sent a demand for surrender, to which Del Caretto replied, "Know that you are dealing with grenadiers, and that Piedmontese grenadiers never surrender".

At 10:00 am, Banel led the 18th Line Infantry in the first French attack. This charge failed after about 20 minutes. A second attack was made at 11:00 am and was repulsed immediately. The French sent a second surrender summons to the defenders while ineffectually bombarding the castle with 4-pounder guns. Provera replied at 2:00 pm, refusing to give up unless he was given free passage for his soldiers. At 4:00 pm, Augereau mounted a major effort to storm the castle. Banel led the 4th and (old) 51st Demi-Brigades to assault the east side, while other troops attacked from the west. The defenders' ammunition began to run low, allowing the French to close in. The fighting was desperate and Del Caretto was killed, but the French finally retreated. Banel was shot in the head and taken to a house nearby, where he died soon after. Provera capitulated at 8:15 am the following day because his soldiers ran out of ammunition and water. A bust of Banel stands in the Galerie des Batailles at the Palace of Versailles.

== Notes ==
Footnotes

Citations
