= Hilarion Paul Puget de Barbantane =

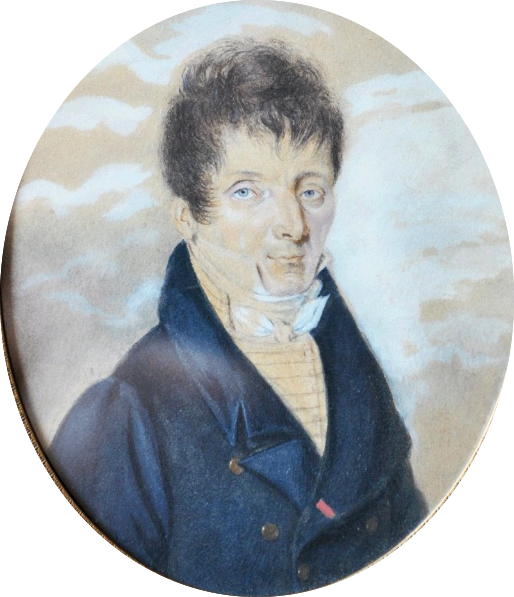
- Born: 8 March 1754; Paris, France
- Died: 27 March 1828 (aged 74); Paris, France
- Military career
- Allegiance: Kingdom of France; France
- Branch: Infantry
- Service years: 1770–1809
- Rank: General of Division
- Conflicts: War of the Pyrenees

Hilarion-Paul-François-Bienvenu du Puget de Barbantane (8 March 1754 – 27 March 1828) disgraced himself during the French Revolutionary Wars by abandoning the Army of the Eastern Pyrenees during a crisis. A nobleman, he was made colonel of the Aunis infantry regiment in 1788. He was promoted general of brigade in 1791 and general of division the following year. He intrigued to obtain command of the Army of the Eastern Pyrenees and got his wish when Louis-Charles de Flers was dismissed in August 1793. When the Spanish commander Antonio Ricardos surrounded Perpignan with a chain of fortified camps, Barbantane panicked and fled the city, going absent without leave.

Two subordinates, Eustache Charles d'Aoust and Jacques Gilles Henri Goguet saved the day by beating the Spanish in the Battle of Peyrestortes. Meanwhile, Barbantane was arrested and put in prison, but remarkably he avoided the guillotine. He was reinstated in rank in 1795 after the Reign of Terror ended. He reappeared during the Coup of 18 Fructidor as one of the unemployed generals surrounding Pierre Augereau who harassed the politicians and generals of the losing faction. Napoleon Bonaparte called him useless and instructed that he remain at home. Considering his unmilitary behavior, is it astonishing that BARBANTANE is one of the names inscribed under the Arc de Triomphe, on Column 34. Neither d'Aoust nor Goguet is so honored.
