= Army of the Alps =

French Revolutionary army

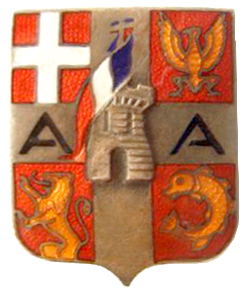
Insignia of the Army of the Alps during World War II

The Army of the Alps (Armée des Alpes) was one of the French Revolutionary armies. It existed from 1792 to 1797 and from July to August 1799, and the name was also used on and off until 1939 for France's army on its border with Italy.

== 1792–1797 ==
The Army of the Alps was created by a decree of the French Convention on 1 October 1792 which divided the Army of the Midi into the Army of the Alps and the Army of the Pyrenees. On 1 November 1793 it was itself divided into the Army of Savoy and the Army of Italy by a conseil exécutif decree.

Following the decrees of 27–29 November 1792 which brought Savoy into the French First Republic under the name of Mont-Blanc department the Army of Savoy was renamed the Army of the Alps, before having the Army before Lyon split off from it between 8 August and 29 October 1793. The Army of the Alps was suppressed by a decree of 21 August 1797 (21 Fructidor year V), put into effect on 13 September, with its men and theatre transferred to the Army of Italy.

=== Composition on 15 December 1792 ===
Below is the composition of the Army of the Alps on 15 December 1792.

- Général d'Armée – Commandant de l'Armée des Alpes, François Étienne de Kellermann

==== Camillo Rossi Division ====
- Maréchal de Camp, Camille de Rossi
  - 1ére Bataillon de Grenadiers des Basses-Alpes – Entrevaux and Colmars
  - 1ére Bataillon de Grenadiers des Hautes-Alpes – Manosque
  - 2éme Bataillon du 10éme Régiment d'Infanterie de Ligne – Mont-Dauphin
  - 2éme Bataillon du 35éme Régiment d'Infanterie de Ligne – Briançon
  - 1ére Bataillon des Basses-Alpes – Barcelonnette
  - 1ére Bataillon d'Ardèche – Briançon
  - Compagnie Franche de Manosque – Sisteron

==== Laroque Division ====
- Maréchal de Camp, Jean-Jacques de la Roque d’Olès
  - 1ére Bataillon du 23éme Régiment d'Infanterie de Ligne – Bramans and Modane
  - 2éme Bataillon du 23éme Régiment d'Infanterie de Ligne – Saint-André-les-Alpes
  - 2éme Bataillon de Chasseurs (Dauphiné) – Lanslebourg-Mont-Cenis, Termignon, and Sollières-Sardières
  - 8éme Bataillon de Chasseurs à Pied (Vosges) – Séez and Saint-Maurice
  - 1ére Bataillon de Landes – Moûtiers
  - 4éme Bataillon d'Isère – Saint-Jean-de-Maurienne
  - 4éme Bataillon d'Ain – Aiguebelle and La Chambre
  - 5éme Bataillon d'Isère – Conflans and L'Hôpital-le-Grand

==== Dubourg Division ====
- Maréchal de Camp, François Joseph Thorillon du Bourg de Vacherolles
  - Grenadiers and Chasseurs of the 20éme, 61éme, and 80éme Régiments des Infanterie de Ligne – Pont-de-Beauvoisin
  - 59éme Régiment d'Infanterie de Ligne – Grenoble
  - 6éme Bataillon de Grenadiers de l'Isère – Vienne
  - 1ére Bataillon de la Haute-Loire – Fort Barrault
  - 1ére Bataillon de l'Ain – Crémieu
  - Légion des Allobroges – Grenoble (forming)
  - Chasseurs de la Gironde – Bourgoin-Jallieu
  - Chasseurs de l'Ardèche – La Tour-du-Pin

==== Saint-Gervais Division ====
- Maréchal de Camp, Jean-Pierre Aaron Seimandy de Saint-Gervais
  - 2éme Bataillon de Lozère – Carpentras
  - 2éme Bataillon de d'Aveyron – Valréas and Visan
  - 4éme Bataillon de la Haute-Garonne – Valence
  - Volontaires de la Drôme – Crest (forming)
  - 3 Compagnies Franches, Romans-sur-Isère (forming)

==== D'Albignac Division ====
- Lieutenant Général Louis Alexandre, Bardon d'Albignac d'Arre
  - Cavalerie du Légion du Midi – Le Puy-en-Velay (Regiment, forming)
  - Infanterie du Légion du Midi – Pont-Saint-Esprit (Battalion, forming)
  - Dépôt Bataillon du 51éme Régiment d'Infanterie de Ligne – Tournon-sur-Rhône
  - Dépôt Bataillon du 70éme Régiment d'Infanterie de Ligne (unknown location)
  - 2éme Bataillon de la Haute-Garonne – Largentière and Aubenas
  - 2éme Bataillon de Cantal – Nîmes
  - 2éme Bataillon de la Drôme – Nîmes
  - 2éme Bataillon de la Haute-Loire – Brioude and Issingeaux (on leave)
  - 3éme Bataillon de l'Isère – Montbrison
  - 5éme Bataillon de la Haute-Garonne – Bourg-Saint-Andéol, Viviers, and Privas
  - 5éme Bataillon de la Rhône-et-Loire – Villefranche-sur-Mer (on leave)
  - 1 Compagnie Franche – Nîmes
  - 1 Compagnie Franche – Beaucaire (forming)

==== Mixed Division ====
- Generals Included: Lieutenant Général Jean-Jacques de la Roque d'Olès, Lieutenant Général Antoine François de Rossi, Maréchal de Camp Louis Joseph Marie Rogon de Carcaradec, and Maréchal de Camp André Horace François de Barral
  - Corps des Guides de l'Armée – Chambéry
  - 1ére and 2éme Escadrons du 9éme Régiment de Dragons – Chambéry
  - 3éme Escadron du 9éme Régiment de Dragons (acting as Despatch riders, not set position)
  - 1ére Bataillon du 79éme Régiment d'Infanterie de Ligne – Chambéry
  - 1ére Bataillon de la Drôme – Saint-Pierre-d'Albigny
  - 1ére Bataillon de Gard – Chambéry
  - 3éme Bataillon de la Drôme – Montmélian
  - Chasseurs Nationaux de Quissac – Aix-en-Provence

==== Grouchy Division ====
- Maréchal de Camp Emmanuel de Grouchy
  - 1ére Escadron du 5éme Régiment de Cavalerie – Annecy
  - 1ére Bataillon d'Aude – Annecy
  - 5éme Bataillon de Gironde – Annecy
  - 6éme Bataillon de Gironde – Rumilly, Haute-Savoie

==== Pourcin Division ====
- Maréchal de Camp Charles Pierre de Pourcin
  - 2éme Escadron du 5éme Régiment de Cavalerie – Recce Party in Chablais, correspondence party in Genevois
  - 1ére Bataillon d'Isère – Thonon-les-Bains
  - 2éme Bataillon d'Ardèche – Gex
  - Volontaires de la Rochelle – Évian-les-Bains
  - Volontaires de Libourne – Versoix
  - 4éme Bataillon de Chasseurs (Corses) – Carrouge

==== Oraison Division ====
- Maréchal de Camp Henri de Fulque d'Oraison
  - 1ére Bataillon de Hautes-Alpes – Belley
  - 1ére Bataillon d'Ariège – Bourg-de-Péage
  - 2éme Bataillon d'Ariège – Nantua
  - 3éme Bataillon du Basses-Alpes – Montluel and Miribel-Lanchâtre (forming)
  - Compagne Franche – Bourg-de-Péage
  - 2 Compagne Franches – Montmerle-sur-Saône

== 1799 ==
Created on 27 July 1799, this incarnation of the Army of the Alps only lasted until 29 August 1799, when it was merged into the Army of Italy.

== Generals ==
Army of the Alps

- 8 October – 6 November 1792 : Anne-Pierre de Montesquiou-Fézensac

Army of Savoy

- 7 – 13 November 1792 : Montesquiou-Fézensac
- 13 November – 4 December, temporarily : Jean Jacques de La Roque d'Olès d'Ornac

Army of the Alps

- 5 – 24 December 1792, temporarily : Ornac
- 25 December 1792 – 5 May 1793 : François Christophe Kellermann
- 6 May – 1 June 1793, temporarily : Ornac
- 2 June – 18 October 1793 : Kellermann, along with overall command of the Army of Italy. Kellermann, to whom the representatives on mission were ordered not to immediately communicate the decree by which he was deprived of this command, continued to command on the frontier until 18 October, when he was arrested and taken to Paris.
  - 2 June – 2 November : Ornac, second in command of the Army of the Alps
  - Army before Lyon:
    - 8 – 18 August, Kellermann was at the siege of Lyon
    - 19 – 21 August, Jean Baptiste de Félix du Muy
    - 22 – 31 August, Kellermann was in command before Lyon
    - 1 September, he went to put himself at the head of the troops guarding the frontier, leaving the besieging division under the command of Guy Coustard de Saint-Lo
- 25 September – 28 October 1793 : François Amédée Doppet, in command before Lyon
- 29 October – 17 November, provisionally : Jean-François Dours
- 18 November – 22 December 1793 : Jean François Carteaux
- 23 December 1793 – 20 January 1794, provisionally : Jean-Louis Pellapra
- 21 January – 14 October 1794 : Thomas-Alexandre Dumas
- 15 October – 30 November 1794, provisionally : Pierre Petitguillaume
- 1 December 1794 – 7 October 1795 : Jean-François-Auguste Moulin, from 5 April subordinate to François Christophe Kellermann
- 5 April 1795 – 13 September 1797 : Kellermann, commander in chief of the Armies of the Alps and Italy until 28 September 1795. He visited all the encampments of the Army of the Alps from 5 to 15 April 1795, then left for the headquarters of the Army of Italy at Nice.

== 1815 ==
During the Hundred Days, Napoleon activated the Army of the Alps and placed it under the command of Marshal Louis Gabriel Suchet. The force consisted on two regular infantry divisions, one cavalry division, three national guard divisions, and attached artillery. Philibert Jean-Baptiste Curial led the 10-battalion strong 23rd Infantry Division. Jean Mesclop's brigade was made up of three battalions of the 7th Line and two battalions of the 14th Line Infantry Regiment. Jean Louis Eloi Bouvard's brigade comprised three battalions of the 20th Line and two battalions of the 24th Line. Joseph Marie, Count Dessaix commanded the 24th Infantry Division with seven battalions in two brigades. Jean Montfalcon's brigade had three battalions of the 67th Line. Jean Revest's brigade included two battalions each of the 42nd Line and 53rd Line. François Jean Baptiste Quesnel led a cavalry division consisting of only one brigade. Bernard Meyer de Schauensee's brigade consisted of the 10th Chasseurs à Cheval and 18th Dragoon Regiments. The 5th, 6th, and 7th National Guard Divisions were led by Théodore Chabert, Claude Marie Pannetier, and Jean-Pierre Maransin, respectively. The artillery included six foot batteries from the 4th Artillery Regiment and one battery from the 4th Horse Artillery Regiment.

== Twentieth century ==
=== 1940 ===
In the mid-twentieth century, the Army of the Alps defended France's southeastern frontier with Italy, manning the Alpine Line fortifications of the Maginot Line. The army's commander was General René Olry, headquartered at Valence. Its chief units were the 14th Army Corps in the Fortified Sector of the Savoy and Fortified Sector of the Dauphiné, and the 15th Army Corps in the SF Maritime Alps.

The Army of the Alps repelled some Italian invasion attempts, while being greatly outnumbered. Now there is an explanation because the French had the high ground in the situation, though for example, during the Battle of Menton, 9 French Alpine troops (chasseur alpin) supported by artillery fought against 3000 Italians and held their position until the surrender of the French government.

The army surrendered to German forces at the end of June 1940 in accordance with the terms of the Second Armistice at Compiègne, having repelled some Italian forces in the Italian invasion of France.

=== 1945 ===
On 6 June 1944 the Allies invaded Normandy, France; shortly after French Troops under Jean Lattre De Tassigny invaded the coast of Provence in south of France. Paris was liberated on by 25 August and General DeGaulle was reforming the French Military for the invasion of Germany. De Gaulle was very keen on France playing a major role in the war; as a result General Paul-André Doyen was recalled to service on 1 Feb 1945. General Doyen's first assignment was to be the Inspector General of Mountain Troops along the Franco-Italian border on 21 March 1945; it was under this command that the French 27th Alpine Division was assigned. In general the French divisions on the Franco-Italian border were grouped into the French Army of the Alps.

Since Italy invaded France in 1940, and since German troops were on the Italian side of the Franco-Italian border, De Gaulle ordered General Doyen to invade Italy. His army advanced attacking border fortification and taking back all the French territories across the Alps. In April 1945 the French marched into the Aosta Valley with the purpose of annexing it, but their advance was stopped by coordinated fascist and partisan Italian units and later on they were forced to withdraw under American threats.

== Sources ==
- Clerget, Charles (1905). "Tableaux des Armées Françaises pendant les Guerres de la Révolution". Paris: Librarie Militaire R. Chapelot et Cie.
- Schneid, Frederick C. (2002). Napoleon's Italian Campaigns: 1805-1815. Westport, Conn.: Praeger Publishers. ISBN 0-275-96875-8.
- Rochat, Giorgio (2008). "La campagne italienne de juin 1940 dans les Alpes occidentales". Revue historique des armées. 250. Translated by Pilloud, Anne: 77–84, in 29 paragraphs online. doi:10.3917/rha.250.0077.
