= François Amédée Doppet =

French physician and politician (1753–1799)

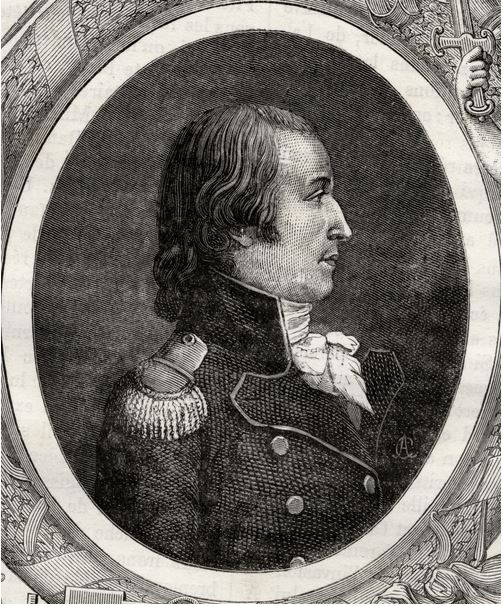
- Born: 16 March 1753; Chambéry, Savoy, Kingdom of Sardinia
- Died: 26 April 1799 (aged 46) Aix-les-Bains, Mont-Blanc, France
- Allegiance: Kingdom of France; France
- Branch: Cavalry
- Service years: Kingdom of France 1770–1773; France 1792–1797
- Rank: General of Division
- Conflicts: War of the First Coalition; Siege of Lyon; Siege of Toulon; Battle of Villelongue
- Other work: Council of Five Hundred

François Amédée Doppet (16 March 1753 – 26 April 1799) was a Savoyard who briefly commanded three French armies during the French Revolutionary Wars without distinction. During the 1770s he enlisted in the French cavalry. Quitting the army after three years, he became a physician after studying medicine at Turin. Later moving to Paris, he became a writer of poems, romances and medical works while also dabbling in aphrodisiacs and mesmerism.

Doppet threw himself wholeheartedly into the French Revolution, was elected to the Legislative Assembly and became a Jacobin. Appointed commander of a volunteer battalion, he took part in the French invasion of Savoy in 1792. Rapidly promoted to general officer in 1793, the government appointed him to command the Army of the Alps in the Siege of Lyon, the army engaged in the Siege of Toulon and the Army of the Eastern Pyrenees. In no case did his time in command last long. During the last appointment he became ill and was replaced, although he was later employed as a division commander. The government used him because he was politically safe but it finally became clear that his military talent was almost non-existent. In 1797 he was elected to the Council of Five Hundred and he died two years later.

Military offices
Preceded by François Christophe Kellermann	Commander-in-chief of the Army of the Alps; 25 September–28 October 1793	Succeeded by Jean François Carteaux
Preceded by Jean François Cornu de La Poype	Commander-in-chief of the Army before Toulon; 13–15 November 1793	Succeeded by Jacques François Dugommier
Preceded by Eustache Charles d'Aoust	Commander-in-chief of the Army of the Eastern Pyrenees; 28 November–20 December 1793	Succeeded by Eustache Charles d'Aoust
