= Espolla =

- Municipality
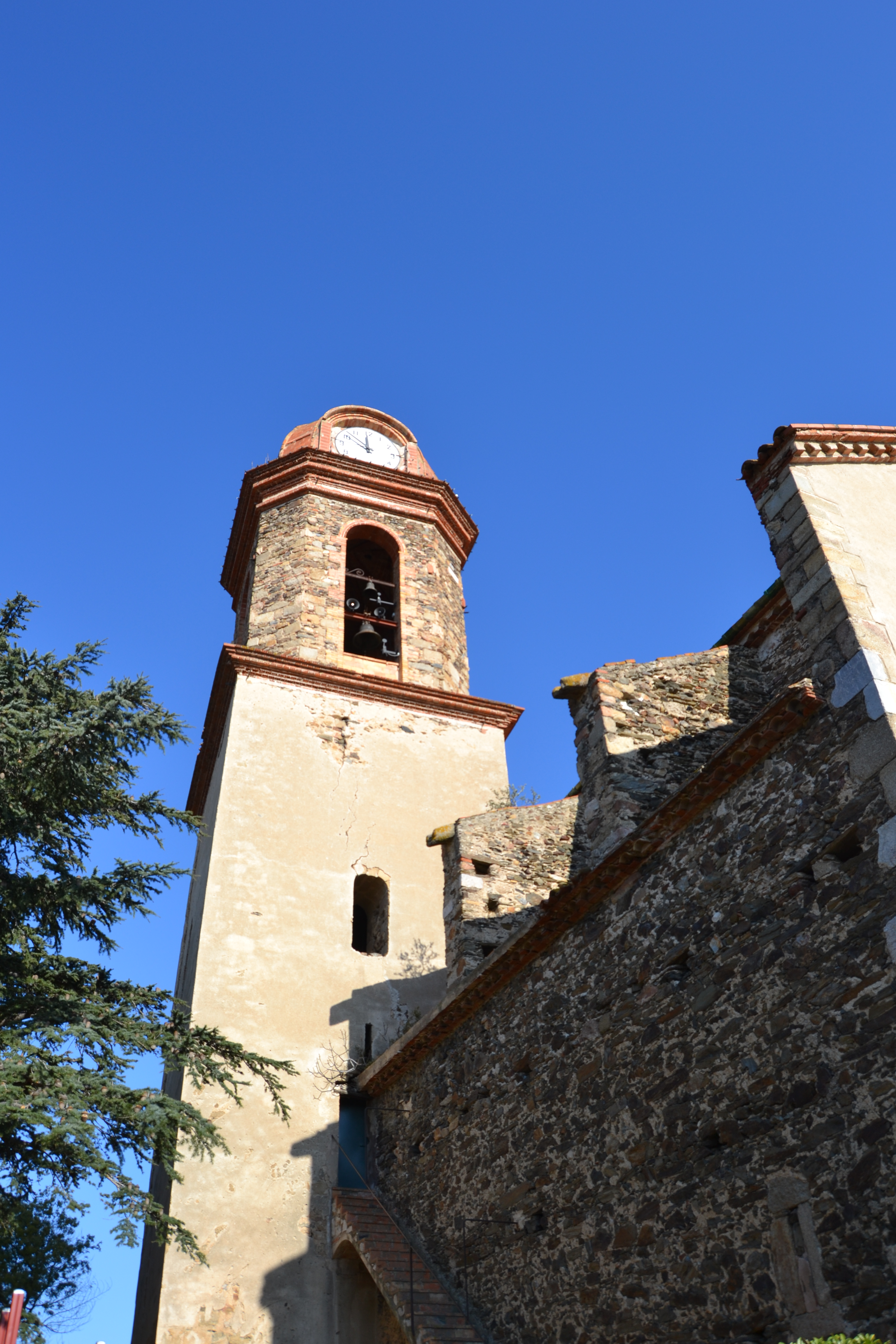
- Espolla church

- Coat of arms

- Location in Catalonia Espolla (Spain)
- Coordinates: 42°23′N 3°0′E
- Country: Spain
- Community: Catalonia
- Province: Girona
- Comarca: Alt Empordà

Government
  - Mayor: Carles Lagresa Felip (2015)

Area
  - Total: 43.6 km^{2} (16.8 sq mi)

Population (2025-01-01)
  - Total: 398
  - Density: 9.13/km^{2} (23.6/sq mi)
- Website: www.espolla.cat

Espolla (Catalan pronunciation: [əsˈpoʎə]) is a municipality in the comarca of Alt Empordà, Girona, Catalonia, Spain.

== Climate ==
Climate data for Espolla, Spain (2007-2016 averages and extremes)
Month	Jan	Feb	Mar	Apr	May	Jun	Jul	Aug	Sep	Oct	Nov	Dec	Year
Record high °C (°F)	23.6 (74.5)	26.5 (79.7)	26.9 (80.4)	29.7 (85.5)	32.1 (89.8)	35.8 (96.4)	38.7 (101.7)	39.7 (103.5)	36.2 (97.2)	34.1 (93.4)	27.9 (82.2)	22.9 (73.2)	39.7 (103.5)
Mean daily maximum °C (°F)	13.9 (57.0)	14.0 (57.2)	16.4 (61.5)	19.9 (67.8)	23.2 (73.8)	27.6 (81.7)	30.6 (87.1)	30.5 (86.9)	27.1 (80.8)	22.5 (72.5)	17.2 (63.0)	14.3 (57.7)	21.4 (70.6)
Daily mean °C (°F)	8.4 (47.1)	8.5 (47.3)	11.1 (52.0)	14.1 (57.4)	17.4 (63.3)	21.5 (70.7)	24.1 (75.4)	23.9 (75.0)	20.7 (69.3)	16.8 (62.2)	12.0 (53.6)	8.8 (47.8)	15.6 (60.1)
Mean daily minimum °C (°F)	3.0 (37.4)	3.1 (37.6)	5.8 (42.4)	8.3 (46.9)	11.7 (53.1)	15.2 (59.4)	17.3 (63.1)	17.4 (63.3)	14.5 (58.1)	11.4 (52.5)	7.0 (44.6)	3.6 (38.5)	9.9 (49.7)
Record low °C (°F)	−5.6 (21.9)	−6.8 (19.8)	−5.4 (22.3)	1.0 (33.8)	4.2 (39.6)	9.8 (49.6)	10.3 (50.5)	11.1 (52.0)	6.6 (43.9)	−0.8 (30.6)	−5.9 (21.4)	−6.2 (20.8)	−6.8 (19.8)
Average precipitation mm (inches)	29.7 (1.17)	36.1 (1.42)	67.8 (2.67)	46.3 (1.82)	71.8 (2.83)	39.0 (1.54)	21.0 (0.83)	29.7 (1.17)	53.6 (2.11)	79.9 (3.15)	109.2 (4.30)	36.8 (1.45)	620.9 (24.46)
Source: Servei Meterològic de Catalunya
