= Battle of Peyrestortes =

1793 battle during the War of the Pyrenees

- Part of the War of the Pyrenees
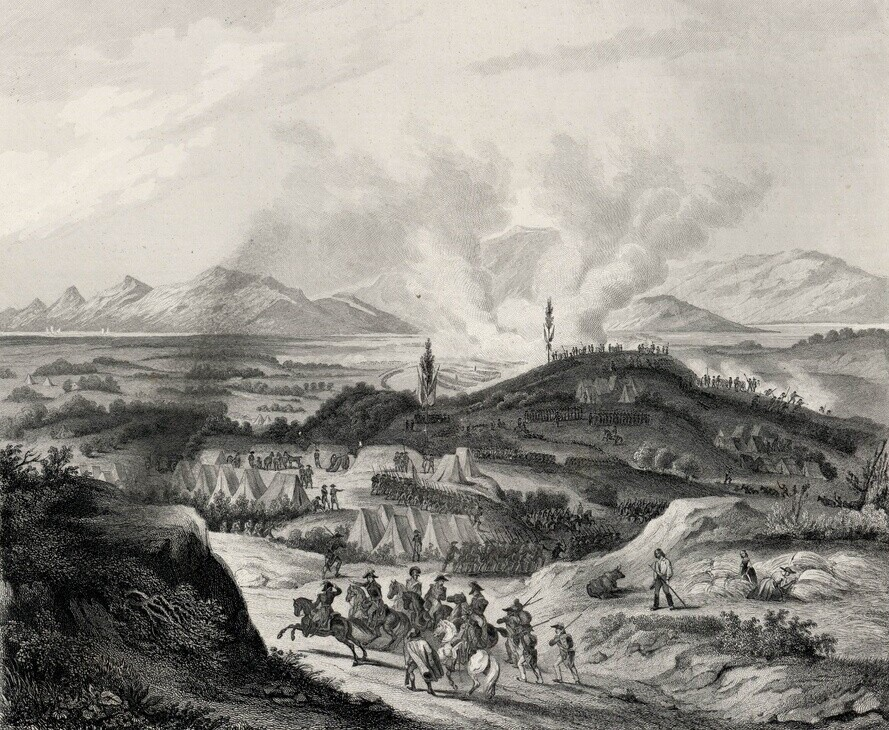
- Battle of Peyrestortes by Charles-Caïus Renoux
Date	17 September 1793
Location	Peyrestortes, Pyrénées-Orientales, France 42.7550°N 2.8525°E
Result	French victory

Belligerents
France	Spain

Commanders and leaders
(French First Republic) Eustache d'Aoust (French First Republic) Jacques Goguet	(Spain) Antonio Ricardos (Spain) Marquis Amarillas (Spain) Juan de Courten

Strength
8,000	6,000–12,000

Casualties and losses
200–300, Unknown	1,702–3,500, 26–46 guns, 7 colors
- Location within Europe

At the Battle of Peyrestortes (17 September 1793) in the War of the Pyrenees, soldiers of the First French Republic defeated a Spanish army that had invaded Roussillon and was attempting to capture Perpignan. The Spanish army of Antonio Ricardos had occupied part of Roussillon and made an abortive attempt to seize the fortress of Perpignan in July 1793. At the end of August, the Spanish commander sent two divisions on a sweep around the western side of Perpignan in an attempt to isolate the fortress and choke it off from resupply. After an initial Spanish success, the French army commander Hilarion Paul Puget de Barbantane, lost his nerve and fled from the area.

Eustache Charles d'Aoust and Jacques Gilles Henri Goguet assumed command and attacked two divisions of the Army of Catalonia led by Juan de Courten and Jerónimo Girón-Moctezuma, Marquis de las Amarillas. The Spanish were routed and never again advanced so far into Roussillon. After the battle, the Army of Catalonia found itself back in its original positions. Ricardos successfully defended a Spanish foothold in France during the remainder of 1793. Peyrestortes is located 7 kilometres (4.3 mi) northwest of Perpignan.

== Background ==
=== Positions ===
Beginning in April 1793, Captain General Ricardos and his Spanish army brushed aside the badly trained French armies in the department of Pyrénées Orientales. Ricardos defeated General of Division Louis-Charles de Flers at the Battle of Mas Deu on 19 May. The Siege of Bellegarde concluded with the Spanish capture of the important Fort de Bellegarde on 24 June. Ricardos and de Flers fought again on 17 July in the Battle of Perpignan and this time the 12,000 French troops repulsed a 15,000-strong Spanish assault. However, even a victory was not enough to satisfy the all-powerful and high-handed Representatives-on-mission. They arrested de Flers on 7 August on the charge of "having lost the confidence of the citizen-soldiers". The general was sent to Paris and eventually executed by guillotine.

The representatives-on-mission appointed General of Division Barbantane as de Flers' successor as army commander. Barbantane had been one of the generals critical of de Flers. At the same time de Flers was sacked, the representatives-on-mission sent General of Division Luc Siméon Auguste Dagobert and 3,000 troops to carry out an independent operation in the Cerdagne. On 28 August, Dagobert would win a victory over General Manuel la Peña at Puigcerdà. Meanwhile, the Army of the Eastern Pyrenees had been left by de Flers in the fortified Camp de l'Union under the walls of the fortress of Perpignan, the capital and defensive key to the Pyrénées Orientales department.

Ricardos responded to the situation by establishing his own fortified camp at Ponteilla on the southwest side of Perpignan. The Spanish commander also built fortified camps at Argelès-sur-Mer to the southeast of Perpignan and Olette on the Têt River to the west. Ricardos directed Lieutenant General Marquis de las Amarillas and his division to cross the Têt and attack the French camps on the north side between Millas and Perpignan. Amarillas scored an initial success, driving the French from Corneilla-la-Rivière on 31 August and gaining a foothold on the north bank. Elements of the 61st and 79th Line Infantry Regiments carried out a rearguard action as they withdrew north to Rivesaltes. At this time the French still controlled Collioure on the Mediterranean coast well to the south of Perpignan.

=== Plans ===
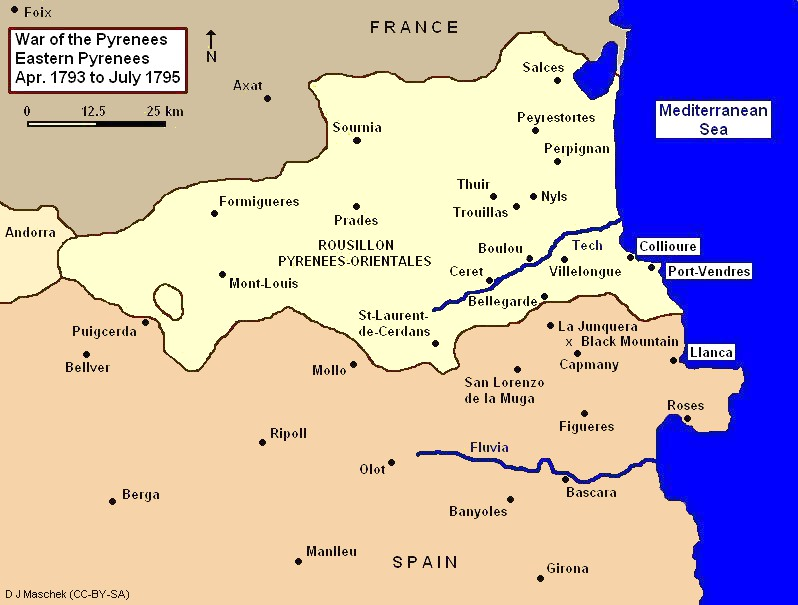
War of the Pyrenees, Eastern Pyrenees

On 3 September, a Spanish probe was turned back at the Mill of Orles near Perpignan by Colonel Charles-Louis Gau de Fregeville's 2nd Hussar Regiment and other troops under Lieutenant Colonel Pierre Banel's command. The next day, Barbantane suddenly withdrew his headquarters and one division from Perpignan north to Salses-le-Château, turning over command of Perpignan to General of Division d'Aoust. When the representatives-on-mission demanded answers, Barbantane insisted he was commander of the Army of the Eastern Pyrenees and not of Perpignan.

Finally, the thoroughly panicked Barbantane abandoned his army altogether, dashing off to Narbonne supposedly looking for reinforcements. In his letter of resignation to the War Minister, he wrote, "The situation is beyond my powers", and he was dismissed. The government named Louis Marie Turreau as the new army commander, but it would be some time before he arrived from the Vendée. In the meantime, the representatives chose Dagobert as Barbantane's successor. Pending Dagobert's arrival from the Cerdagne, the representatives appointed d'Aoust to assume temporary command and named General of Brigade Goguet to lead the 4,000-man division at Salces.

Hearing of Barbantane's unmilitary behavior, Ricardos determined to take advantage of the disarray in the French high command. The Spanish commander ordered Amarillas to march to Peyrestortes via Baixas. On 8 September, Amarillas occupied Peyrestortes, northwest of the provincial capital. That day, he attacked d'Aoust's Camp of the Union at Rivesaltes and drove the French away after a tough fight. Meanwhile, D'Aoust and General of Brigade Louis Lemoine constructed redoubts to defend Perpignan. The Spanish set up a fortified camp at Peyrestortes and defended it with 12,000 soldiers. The Spanish pushed forward a column from Peyrestortes to Vernet (a suburb 2 kilometres (1.2 mi) north of Perpignan). This was Lieutenant General Juan de Courten's division, which took position behind an irrigation canal, with 24 cannon covering the road leading north to Salces. This last move was a blunder because Ricardos did not mount a serious enough threat to d'Aoust's forces from the south at the same time.

== Battle ==
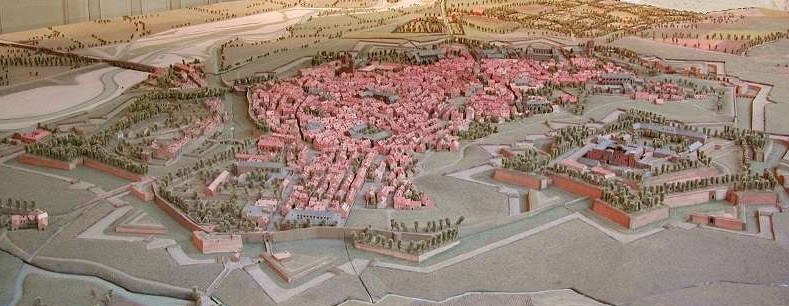
A scale model shows the fortress of Perpignan with the bridge pointing north. Le Vernet is just to the left across the bridge.

At 2:00 am on 17 September, José de Iturrigaray's Spanish artillery brought Perpignan under a heavy bombardment from the direction of Cabestany to the southeast. Ricardos deployed 6,000 troops to support the gunners on the south and west sides of the fortress. At 4:00 am that morning, d'Aoust fell upon de Courten's division at Vernet in four columns. Lemoine led the left column, Colonel Catherine-Dominique de Pérignon commanded the center column including some cavalry under Banel, and General of Brigade Antoine Soulérac directed the right column. An observation force that included Lieutenant Jean Lannes moved to the far left. One of the French columns managed to turn de Courten's flank. After a stubborn fight, the French captured all of de Courten's artillery.

At 10:30 am d'Aoust hesitated, worried that Ricardos might assault Perpignan from the south. However, a crowd of citizens from Perpignan had watched the fight and they demanded more action. Urged on by the representatives-on-mission, d'Aoust reformed his soldiers and prepared to attack Peyrestortes. Representative Joseph Cassanyes galloped away to Salces-le-Château to bring Goguet into the fight. In the improvised battle plan the two divisions would attack together at 5:00 pm. D'Aoust had no authority over Goguet and his division, but the two agreed to cooperate. D'Aoust attacked at 5:00 pm with 4,000 men, but was driven off. Because of bad staff work, Goguet's 3,500-man division was late and only joined the battle at 7:00 pm.

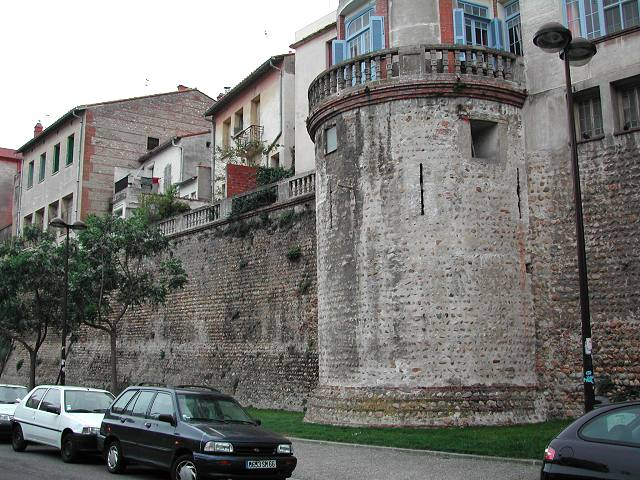
Some parts of Perpignan's ramparts survive today. Rather than attack the fortress directly, the Spanish tried to surround it with fortified camps.

The Salses-le-Château column was led by Goguet and General of Brigade Pierre Poinsot de Chansac. Guided by Cassanyes who was familiar with the area, the French found a gap in the Spanish defenses. Amarillas neglected to post troops to defend a ravine, and Goguet exploited this blunder to push his soldiers into a hand-to-hand fight where Spanish firepower counted for little and French élan for much. As the day wore on, French reinforcements kept arriving from Salses, giving their attack ever increasing momentum. The fighting went on even as daylight faded. Soulérac's column joined the attack on Peyrestortes hill. In the confusion and darkness, Rafael Adorno's Spanish cavalry panicked and withdrew. By 10:00 pm, French soldiers broke into the Spanish positions and forced both Amarillas and de Courten into a disorderly retreat back to Trouillas and Mas Deu.

== Results ==
Historian Ramsay Weston Phipps stated that the French captured 500 Spanish soldiers, 43 guns and seven colors, but did not list the killed and wounded. Digby Smith gave Spanish losses as 52 officers and 1,150 rank and file killed, wounded, and missing out of 6,000 engaged. In addition, the French captured 500 men, 26 cannon, and seven colors. French losses were given as 200 killed and wounded out of a total of 8,000 troops involved in the fighting. Another source listed Spanish casualties as 800 killed and 1,500 wounded, while the French captured 1,200 prisoners, 40 cannons and six howitzers. During the action, Pérignon was wounded in the thigh and he received promotion to general of brigade the following day. The next action was the Battle of Truillas on 22 September 1793.

The heroes of Peyrestortes fared poorly. In late December, the French suffered a costly defeat at the Battle of Collioure. At the end of 1793, the only French soil held by her enemies was in Roussillon. Even though the representatives-on-mission shared a large part of the responsibility for failure, d'Aoust was arrested and sent to the guillotine on 2 July 1794 during the Reign of Terror. On 21 April 1794, Goguet's division was defeated during an abortive attempt to break the Siege of Landrecies. During the retreat some mutinous soldiers shot down their general. Though the fatally wounded Gouget begged Jean Baptiste Bernadotte to keep calm, Bernadotte harangued the troops until they seized the assassins. Ultimately an officer was sentenced to die for inciting his soldiers.

In spite of his strange defection, Barbantane managed to avoid the guillotine. He was imprisoned at Toulouse but later freed. Maximilien Robespierre put him in prison again but he survived the Reign of Terror. Later on, Napoleon instructed that Barbantane be left at home because he was useless at Paris.

== Monument ==
A battle memorial commemorating the victory is 1 kilometre (0.6 mi) southeast of the village, near the Perpignan–Rivesaltes Airport. The monument has the following inscription, A la mémoire de l'armée des Pyrénées-Orientales qui combattirent à Peyrestortes sous la conduite des conventionnels Cassanyes, Fabre, des généraux Daoust et Goguet. (To the memory of the Army of the Eastern Pyrenees which fought at Peyrestortes under the direction of deputies Cassanyes, Fabre, of generals Daoust and Goguet.)

== Notes ==
Preceded by Siege of Bellegarde (1793)	French Revolution: Revolutionary campaigns Battle of Peyrestortes	Succeeded by Siege of Toulon (1793)
