= Battle of Truillas =

1793 battle of the War of the Pyrenees

- Part of the War of the Pyrenees
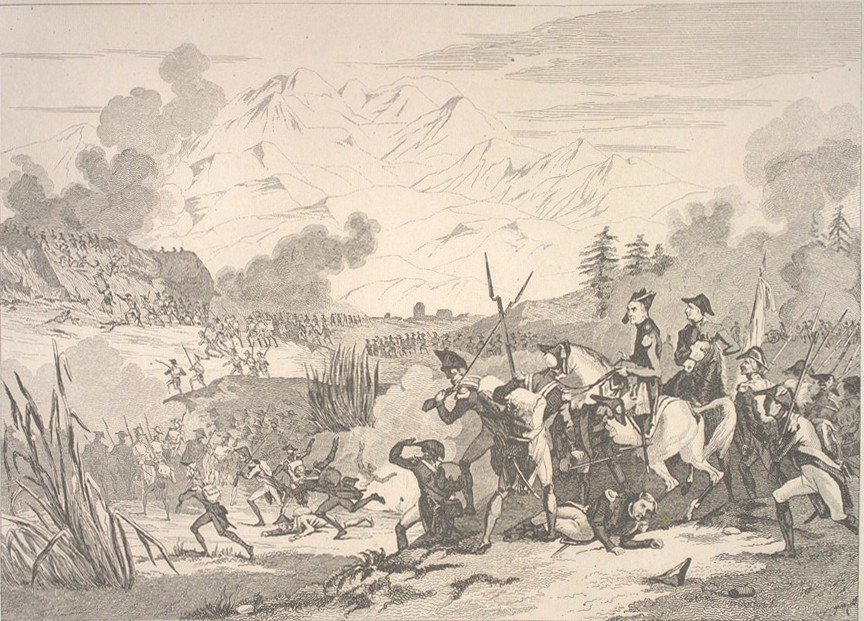
- The Battle of Truillas by Jean-Baptiste Réville.
Date	22 September 1793
Location	Trouillas, Pyrénées-Orientales, France 42°36′39″N 2°48′28″E
Result	Spanish victory

Belligerents
Spain	France

Commanders and leaders
(Spain) Antonio Ricardos	(France) Luc Siméon Dagobert

Strength
17,000	22,000

Casualties and losses
2,000	4,500, 10 guns
- Location within France

The Battle of Truillas, on 22 September 1793, saw the Republican French Army of the Eastern Pyrenees led by Luc Siméon Auguste Dagobert attack the Spanish Army of Catalonia commanded by Antonio Ricardos. This attempt by the French to exploit their success in the Battle of Peyrestortes ended in a Spanish victory. Dagobert tried to outflank the Spanish left wing, but Ricardos blocked the move. Dagobert then attacked the Spanish center and had initial success, but Ricardos rapidly shifted his forces to counter the French. Thwarted, Dagobert was finally compelled to order a retreat. Dagobert's scornful treatment of two key subordinates was one reason for the lackluster French performance. The battle was fought near the village of Trouillas in the French department of Pyrénées Orientales during the War of the Pyrenees.

== Background ==
Since invading French Roussillon in April 1793, Captain General Ricardos and his Spanish army won a string of successes over the defending forces of the French First Republic. The Siege of Bellegarde ended with a French capitulation on 24 June 1793. Since June, the Spanish army maintained itself a few kilometers south of Perpignan, the department capital. In early September, Ricardos made a bid to isolate and capture the fortress of Perpignan by sending two divisions around its western side to cut the road to Narbonne. Meanwhile, he bombarded the city from the south. French troops under General of Division Eustache Charles d'Aoust and General of Brigade Jacques Gilles Henri Goguet attacked the positions of Spanish Lieutenant General Jerónimo Girón-Moctezuma, Marquis de las Amarilas at Peyrestortes and Lieutenant General Juan de Courten at Vernet-les-Bains. The resulting Battle of Peyrestortes on 17 September was an important French victory. The badly shaken Spanish army regrouped near Trouillas.

The day after Peyrestortes, General of Division Luc Siméon Auguste Dagobert was appointed commander of the Army of the Eastern Pyrenees. Desiring to take advantage of the recent victory and urged on by Representative-on-mission Claude Fabre, Dagobert decided to attack Ricardos in his camp at Trouillas.

== Battle ==
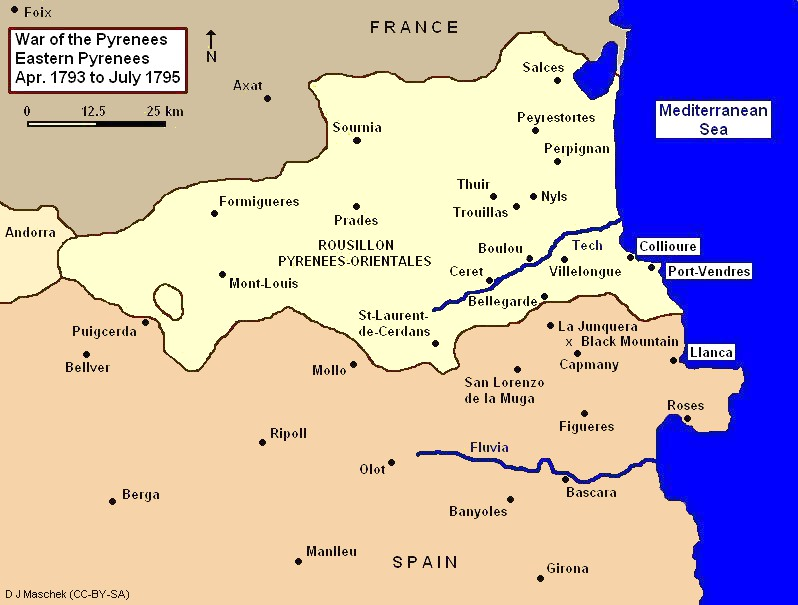
War of the Pyrenees, Eastern Pyrenees.

Trouillas nestles in a plain on the Canterrane stream at an altitude of about 100 meters. Mas Deu, an establishment founded by the Knights Templar in medieval times, is located 2.4 km to the east. Thuir lies five km to the northwest. Ricardos defended these positions with a force of 17,000 soldiers and 38 cannons. The second battalion of the Barcelona Infantry Regiment arrived, but this reinforcement did not make up for the heavy Spanish losses suffered at Peyrestortes. Dagobert attacked the Spanish defenses with 22,000 soldiers. The French order of battle included the 7th, 61st, 70th, and 79th Infantry Demi-Brigades, as well as the National Guards of Gers and Gard.

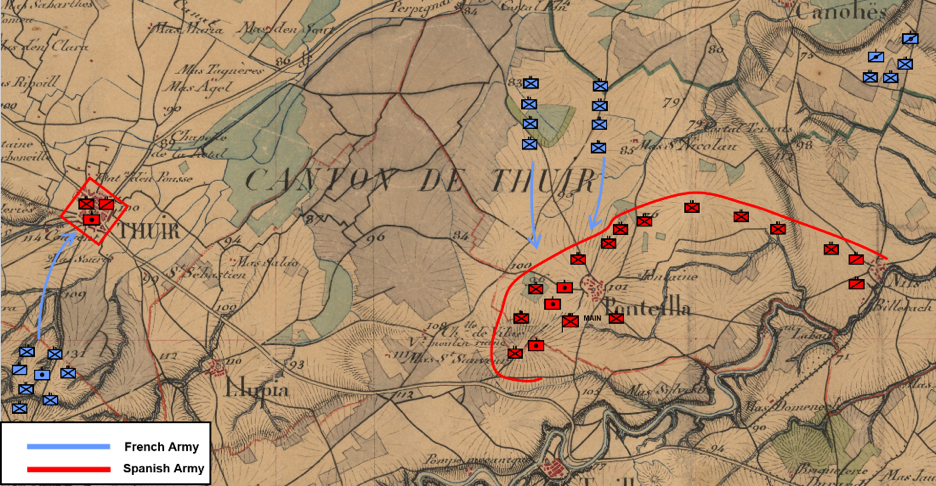
Battle of Trouillas from Hamel.

Dagobert preferred to envelop the Spanish position from the west, but Fabre and the other generals persuaded him to make a frontal attack. So he sent General of Brigade Louis Antoine Goguet's division to assault the Spanish left flank at Thuir while sending a flanking column to attack that town from the west. D'Aoust's division was ordered to attack the Spanish right flank at Mas Deu, while Dagobert led his own division in an attempt to pierce the Spanish center. Believing that Thuir was the focus of the main French effort, Ricardos posted General Crespo and only 3,000 men to defend the Spanish right. He shifted the troops of LG Pedro Téllez-Girón, 9th Duke of Osuna and LG Luis Firmín de Carvajal, Conde de la Unión to hold Thuir. Dagobert's attack pushed back the Spanish center and forced its way into the main camp at Trouillas. Meanwhile, Goguet ran into a concentration of Spanish infantry and artillery on the west flank at Thuir and was beaten. Ricardos personally led a cavalry charge to break up the flanking column, then he returned to the crisis of the battle in the center. D'Aoust merely skirmished with Crespo near Mas Deu and never mounted a serious threat to the Spanish right. This allowed Ricardos to mass his cavalry against Dagobert's division. After disposing of Goguet, de la Unión marched to Trouillas to take the French center in reverse. Three French demi-brigades were surrounded and many prisoners taken. After an all-day battle Dagobert retreated northeast to Canohès.

The Spanish victory was also helped by disorganization and poor logistical arrangements on the part of the French.

== Result ==
Though Dagobert admitted only 1,500 casualties, historian Digby Smith notes that the French actually suffered 3,000 killed and wounded, with 1,500 soldiers and 10 artillery pieces captured. The Spanish army lost a total of 2,000 killed, wounded, and missing. De Courten and General Diego Godoy also fought for the Spanish. Representatives Fabre and Raymond Gaston removed the unsuccessful Dagobert from command of the army on 28 September and temporarily replaced him with d'Aoust. Dagobert returned to the Cerdagne with his division and sacked the Spanish town of Camprodon on 4 October. However, the positive casualty exchange proved inconsequential as 15,000 reinforcements reached the French the day after the battle while Ricardos' army continued to shrink. Though Ricardos gained the victory at Trouillas, he soon found it expedient to withdraw to the Tech River. On 3 October, the Spanish commander and 15,000 troops repulsed d'Aoust and 16,000 Frenchmen at Le Boulou on the Tech. In that action, 1,200 French soldiers became casualties against only 300 Spaniards.

== Footnotes ==
Preceded by First Battle of Wissembourg (1793)	French Revolution: Revolutionary campaigns Battle of Truillas	Succeeded by Second Battle of Wissembourg (1793)
