= Eustache Charles d'Aoust =

French general executed during French Revolution

Eustache Charles Joseph d'Aoust
- Born: 27 February 1763; Douai, France
- Died: 2 July 1794 (aged 31) Paris, France
- Allegiance: France
- Rank: General of Division
- Conflicts: French Revolutionary Wars; Battle of Peyrestortes; Battle of Truillas; Action at Boulou; Battle of Villelongue

Eustache Charles Joseph d'Aoust (27 February 1763, Douai – 2 July 1794, Paris) was a general officer during the French Revolutionary Wars.

He started his military career in the Old Regime army, served on the staffs of three of the early army commanders, and later fought in the War of the Pyrenees against the Kingdom of Spain. On three occasions, he commanded the Army of the Eastern Pyrenees, but he shared the fate of two previous commanders when he was arrested and guillotined by the Committee of Public Safety.

== Early career ==
The son of Eustache Jean-Marie D'Aoust, who later became a member of the National Convention, Eustache Charles d'Aoust began his military career as a second lieutenant supernumerary without pay in the Royal Regiment of Infantry on 21 April 1778 at the age of 15. He became sous-lieutenant on 14 April 1782, second lieutenant on 23 April 1786, and first lieutenant on 16 August 1789. D'Aoust was appointed aide-de-camp to Marshal Jean-Baptiste Donatien de Vimeur, comte de Rochambeau on 26 May 1790. He became captain and adjutant to Marshal Nicolas Luckner on 21 May 1792. He became aide-de-camp to General Armand Louis de Gontaut, Duc de Biron on 13 July 1792, and received a promotion to colonel on 7 October.

== Eastern Pyrenees ==
D'Aoust was provisionally appointed general of brigade in the Army of the Eastern Pyrenees on 2 June 1793. He was provisionally appointed general of division by representatives Joseph Fabre and Reymond Gaston on 7 August and assumed command of the camp near Perpignan. This was a difficult time to be a general in the eastern Pyrenees. The Spanish army captured the Fort de Bellegarde, a major fortress, when the siege ended on 24 June. Previous commander Claude Souchon de Chameron was in prison and Louis-Charles de Flers joined him when he was arrested on 6 August. Both Souchon and de Flers were guillotined in 1794 during the Reign of Terror. To make matters worse, the Spanish commander Captain General Antonio Ricardos was a capable opponent.

Believing that Ricardos' Spanish army was unstoppable, Hilarion Paul de Puget-Barbantane moved his headquarters well to the rear on 4 September 1793, putting d'Aoust in charge of Perpignan. On 11 September, Barbantane fled to Toulouse, leaving the Army of the Eastern Pyrenees without a commander. The army briefly separated into three independent divisions and d'Aoust took command of the 1st Division. On 17 September, d'Aoust won a significant victory at the Battle of Peyrestortes. He led his troops in an attack on Juan de Courten's 6,000 Spanish soldiers at the Camp of Vernet. Other French troops under Jacques Gilles Henri Goguet attacked Peyrestortes hill, where Jerónimo Girón-Moctezuma, Marquis de las Amarilas deployed his division. After heavy fighting that lasted into the night, the French inflicted a major defeat on their opponents. Spanish killed, wounded, and captured numbered at least 1,702, and 26 cannon were captured. More importantly, the Spanish never seriously threatened Perpignan again.

On 18 August, d'Aoust became subordinated to Luc Siméon Auguste Dagobert, the new army commander. A few days after the French defeat at the Battle of Truillas on 22 September, Dagobert was arrested and d'Aoust became the army commander. On 3 October, d'Aoust with 16,000 men engaged Ricardos and 15,000 Spanish troops at Le Boulou on the Tech River. The Spanish won the battle, inflicting losses of 400 killed and 800 wounded on their enemies while suffering only 300 casualties. During and after the battle, 1,500 French soldiers deserted. Between 11 October and 21 November, Louis Marie Turreau became the new army commander and d'Aoust went back to command the 1st Division. D'Aoust temporarily led the army again from 22 to 27 November until the inept but politically influential François Amédée Doppet took command from 28 November to 20 December.

On 7 December, d'Aoust advanced with 10,000 troops to surprise the enemy camp at Villelongue-dels-Monts. Ricardos with 3,000 Spanish and 5,000 Portuguese soldiers, repulsed the French attack. The French counted 340 killed and wounded, and 312 missing. In addition, 26 cannons, 2 colours, and 2,000 muskets were captured by the Allies. The Allies reported only 56 casualties.

== Execution ==
Although he again assumed temporary army command on 21 December, he was recalled to Paris the next day. On 2 January 1794, Representatives Jacques Cassanyès and Gaston confirmed him as army commander. But his fate was sealed when he was arrested by order of Representatives Édouard Milhaud and Pierre-Amable de Soubrany on 10 January 1794. He was also denounced by his jealous rivals, Turreau and Doppet. Accused of malice and disability, d'Aoust was sentenced to death by the Revolutionary Court. He was guillotined in Paris on 2 July 1794 at the age of 31 years.
