= Le Boulou =

Le Boulou El Voló
- Commune
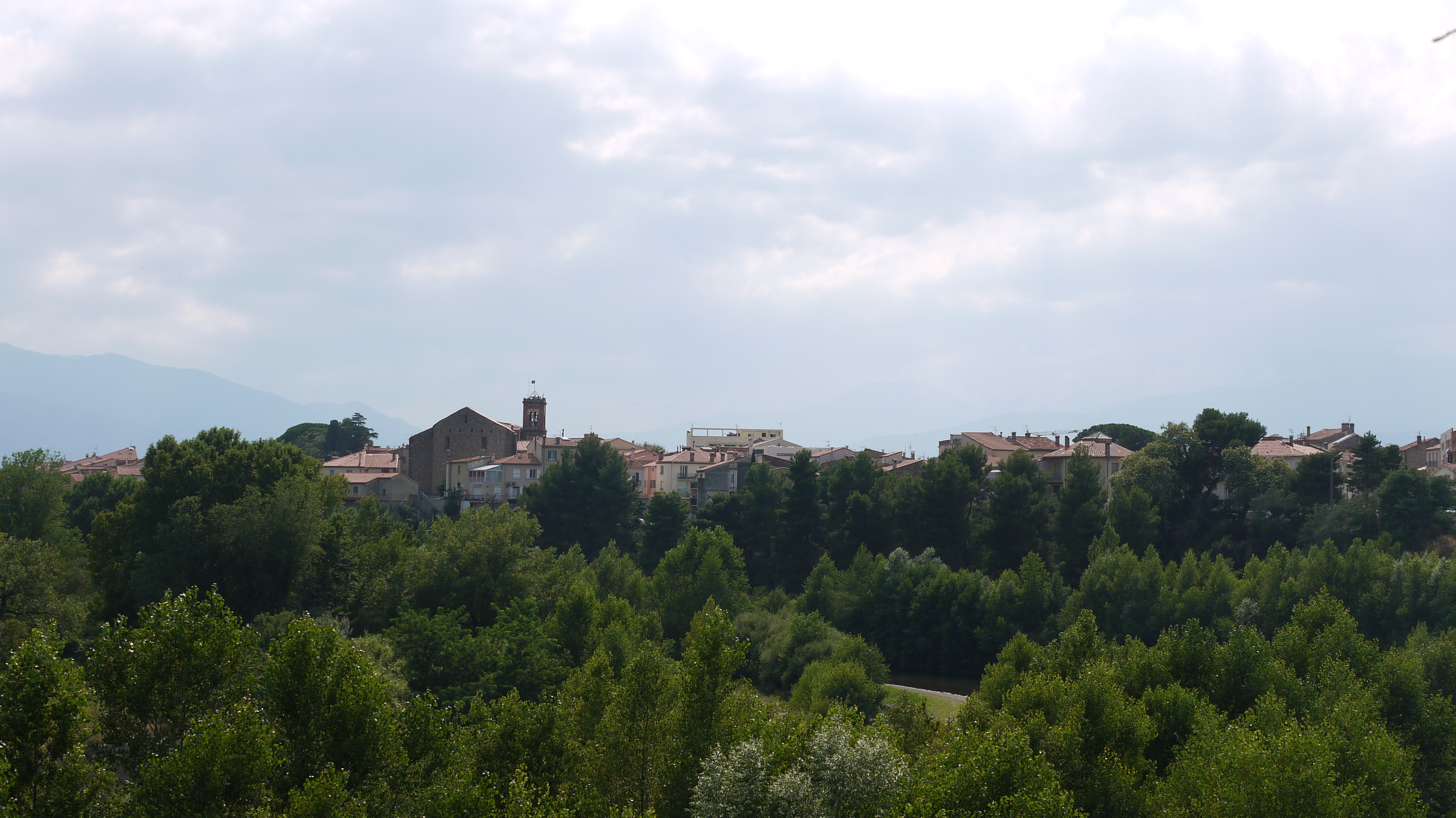
- A general view of Le Boulou

- Coat of arms
- Location of Le Boulou
- Location within France Location within Occitanie
- Coordinates: 42°31′29″N 2°49′51″E
- Country: France
- Region: Occitania
- Department: Pyrénées-Orientales
- Arrondissement: Céret
- Canton: Vallespir-Albères
- Intercommunality: Vallespir

Government
  - Mayor (2026–32): Patrick Francés
- Area^{1}: 14.42 km^{2} (5.57 sq mi)
- Highest elevation: 363 m (1,191 ft)
- Lowest elevation: 55 m (180 ft)
- Population (2023): 5,487
  - Density: 380.5/km^{2} (985.5/sq mi)
- Time zone: UTC+01:00 (CET)
  - Summer (DST): UTC+02:00 (CEST)
- INSEE/Postal code: 66024 /66160
- ^{1} French Land Register data, which excludes lakes, ponds, glaciers > 1 km^{2} (0.386 sq mi or 247 acres) and river estuaries.

Le Boulou (French pronunciation: [lə bulu]; Catalan: El Voló [əl βuˈlo]) is a commune in the Pyrénées-Orientales department in southern France.

It is situated 12 km from the Spanish border.

== Geography ==
=== Localisation ===
The town of Le Boulou is located in the canton of Vallespir-Albères and in the arrondissement of Céret, in the south of Pyrénées-Orientales.

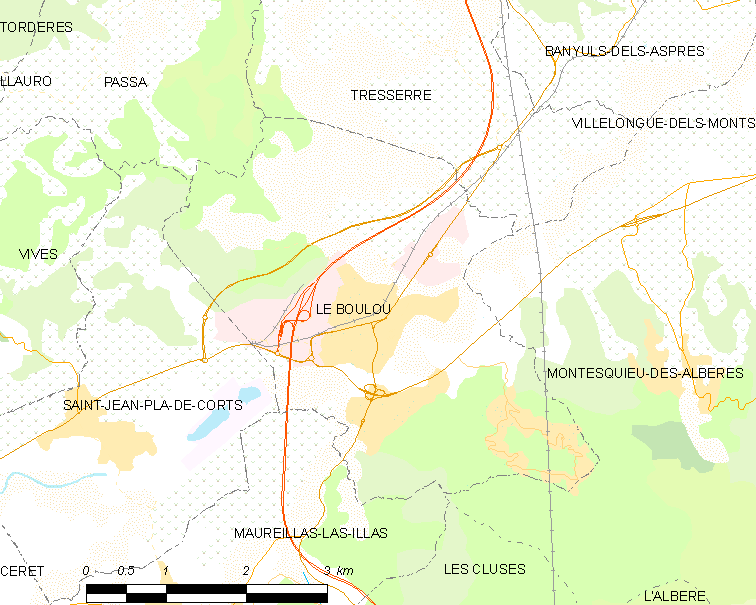
Map of Le Boulou and its surrounding towns

== Toponymy ==
The name of the town in catalan is El Voló.

== History ==
In the 10th century, the territory of Le Boulou was shared between the lord of Saint-Jean-Pla-de-Corts, lady Minimilla, and the church of Elne. Le Boulou was then ruled by the lords of Montesquieu from the 11th to the 14th centuries. It finally becomes part of the crown lands.

At the end of the 17th century, Bernard de Kennedy, following the court of James II of England in France, decided to settle in Le Boulou and received French citizenship from Louis XIV. His grandson, Côme de Kennedy, was granted a title of lord of Le Boulou in 1755. Côme's son Joseph de Kennedy was the incumbent lord during the French Revolution. But his house was used as a headquarter by the Spanish general Antonio Ricardos during the first battle of Boulou in 1793. Accused of betrayal, Joseph de Kennedy was sent to the guillotine on 2 May 1794, on the next day after the second battle of Boulou.

In the 20th century Le Boulou was the site of a camp housing female Republican escapees from Spain at the end of the Spanish Civil War. It was opened as a clearing centre, but there was no shelter and most of the women and children were removed to other parts of France, along with some wounded soldiers. During the German occupation the spa at Le Boulou was a Gestapo headquarters.

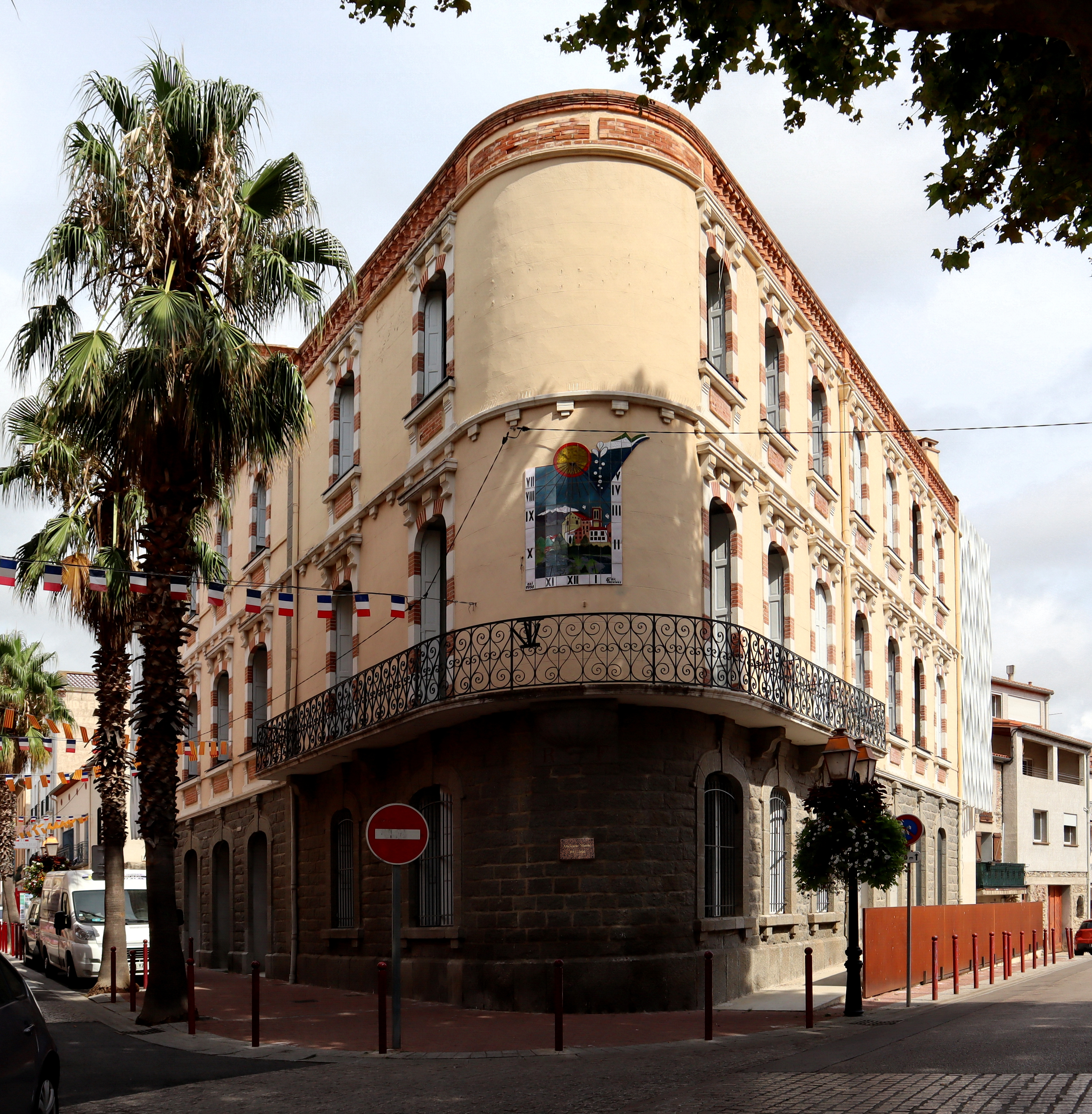
Old town Hall (1912)

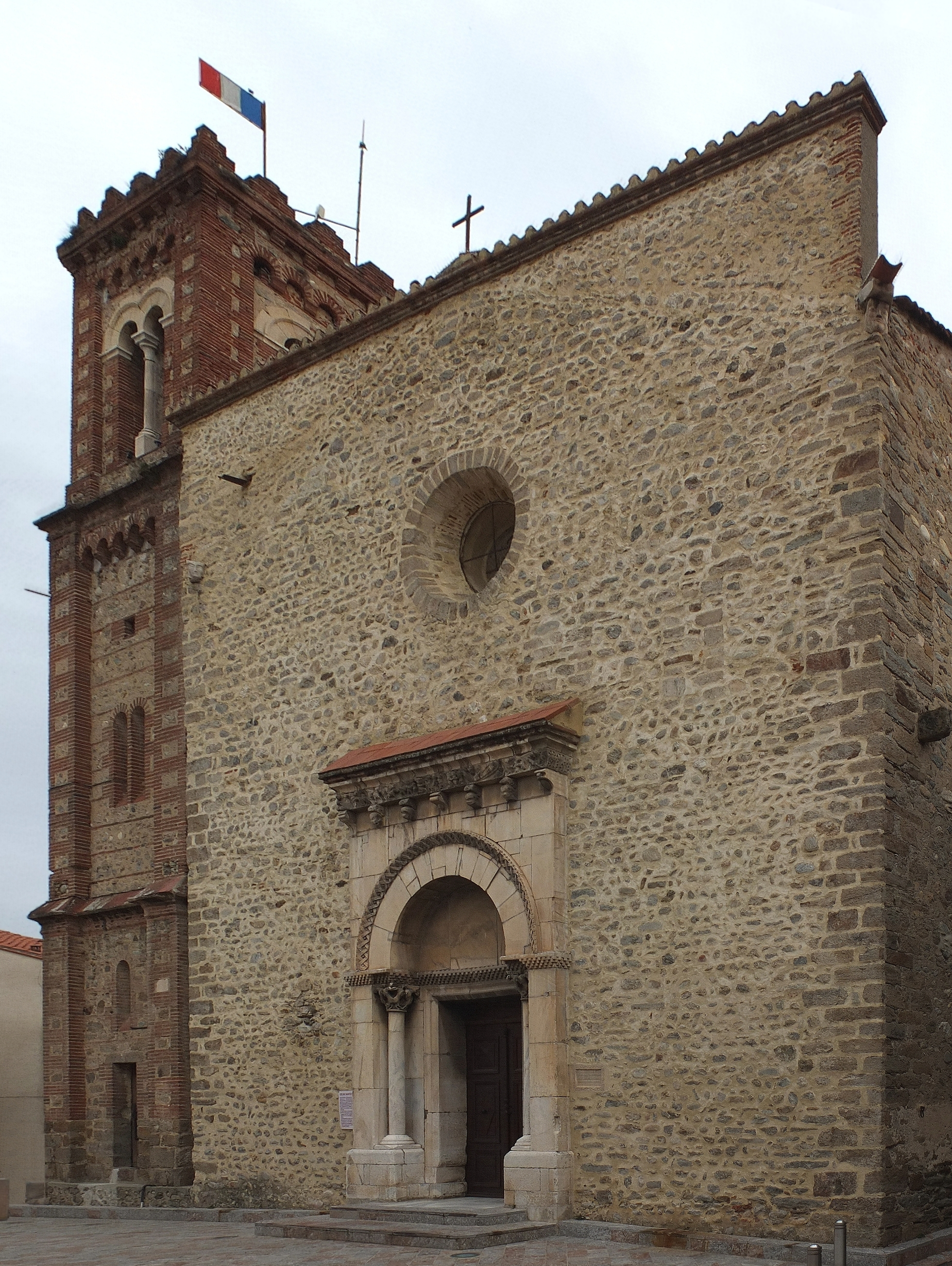
Church Sainte-Marie

== Government and politics ==
=== Mayors ===
Mayor	Term start	Term end
Marie-Rose Careras	1987	1995
Jean-Pierre Salgas	1995	2008
Christian Olive	2008	2014
Nicole Villard-Schlatter	2014	2020
François Comes	2020	2026
Patrick Francés	2026	

== Population ==
Historical population
Year	Pop.	±% p.a.
1968	2,921	—
1975	3,709	+3.47%
1982	4,292	+2.11%
1990	4,436	+0.41%
1999	4,428	−0.02%
2007	5,175	+1.97%
2012	5,520	+1.30%
2017	5,514	−0.02%
2023	5,487	−0.08%
Source: INSEE

== See also ==
- Communes of the Pyrénées-Orientales department
