= Jacques Gilles Henri Goguet =

- Born: 11 March 1767; La Flotte, France
- Died: 21 April 1794 (aged 27) Bray-Saint-Christophe, Aisne, France
- Allegiance: France
- Branch: Infantry
- Service years: 1789–1794
- Rank: General of Division
- Conflicts: War of the First Coalition; Battle of Jemappes; Battle of Peyrestortes; Battle of Truillas; Battle of Le Cateau; Siege of Landrecies

Jacques Gilles Henri Goguet (11 March 1767 – 21 April 1794) rose to command a French division during the French Revolutionary Wars before he was assassinated by his own soldiers after a defeat. Trained as a physician, he studied medicine at the University of Montpellier before becoming a member of the French National Guard in 1789. He joined a volunteer battalion in 1792 and fought at Jemappes in November that year. In 1793 he was promoted to general officer and transferred to the Army of the Eastern Pyrenees. In September 1793 when a Spanish army threatened to surround Perpignan, the French army commander fled, leaving the army leaderless. In the emergency, Goguet cooperated with Eustache Charles d'Aoust to win the Battle of Peyrestortes. A few days later he commanded the right column under Dagobert at Truillas, where poor relations with his commander led to the failure of the attack.

Goguet transferred to the Army of the North with the rank of general of division. He led his division at Le Cateau. In one of the operations during the Siege of Landrecies his troops were repulsed at Prémont by Coalition troops under the Duke of York. During the retreat, a mutinous group of soldiers fired on Goguet and fatally wounded him. Jean-Baptiste Bernadotte, then a chef de brigade (colonel), harangued the guilty regiment and convinced the troops to arrest the assassins. A captain was condemned to death for inciting his men to commit the crime.
