= Battle of the Black Mountain =

1794 battle of the War of the Pyrenees

- Part of the War of the Pyrenees
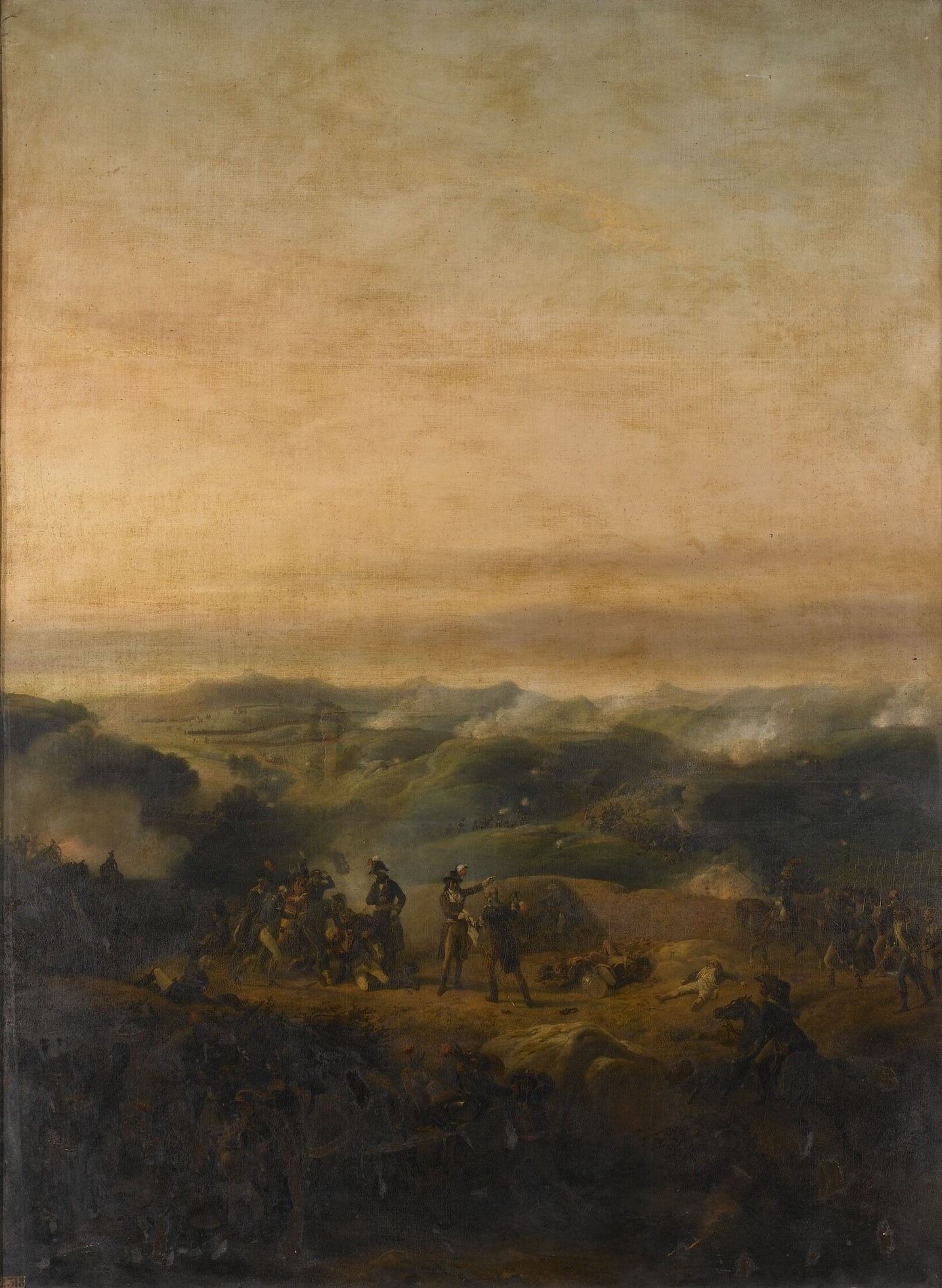
- Jacques François Dugommier's death at the battle
Date	17–20 November 1794
Location	Capmany, Catalonia, Spain 42.3158°N 2.9303°E
Result	French victory

Belligerents
France	Spain; Portugal

Commanders and leaders
Jacques Dugommier †; Dominique Pérignon	Luis de Carvajal †; Jerónimo Moctezuma; John Forbes

Strength
35,000	50,000

Casualties and losses
3,000 killed and wounded	10,000 killed and wounded, 30 cannon captured

The Battle of the Black Mountain (also Capmany or Serra Negra or Del Roure or Montroig) was fought from 17 to 20 November 1794 between the army of the First French Republic and the allied armies of the Kingdom of Spain and the Kingdom of Portugal. The French, led by Jacques François Dugommier, defeated the Allies, who were commanded by Luis Firmín de Carvajal, Conde de la Unión. Though the Spanish right wing held, its left flank was driven back on the first day's fighting. On the last day of the battle, the French overran a key position and put the Spanish army to rout.

The battle was remarkable in that both army commanders were slain. A Spanish artillery shell killed Dugommier early in the battle and Dominique Catherine de Pérignon assumed command of the French army. De la Union was shot dead while leading a cavalry charge on the last day of the fighting and was temporarily replaced by Jerónimo Girón-Moctezuma, Marquis de las Amarillas. The French victory led to the capture of Figueres and the Siege of Roses (Rosas), a port in Catalonia.

== Background ==
In 1793, the Spanish Army won two victories at the Siege of Bellegarde and the Battle of Truillas. These battles and other actions resulted in Spanish forces overrunning part of Roussillon, where France borders Spain on the Mediterranean Sea. On 16 January 1794, Divisional-general Jacques François Dugommier took command of the Army of the Eastern Pyrenees. The victor in the Siege of Toulon immediately reorganized the army, putting it into a state where it would be capable of taking the offensive. The new general began stockpiling supplies, establishing arms factories, setting up hospitals, and improving roads. By April, the field army counted 28,000 soldiers. These were backed up by 20,000 garrison troops and 9,000 raw volunteers.

Forming his army into the infantry divisions of Divisional-generals Dominique Catherine de Pérignon, Pierre Francois Sauret, and Pierre Augereau, plus a cavalry reserve under Divisional-general André de La Barre, Dugommier launched his offensive in late April 1794. The French victory in the Battle of Boulou, on 1 May, caused the Spanish army to withdraw south of the Pyrenees. The recapture of Collioure occurred on 29 May. Pérignon won a combat at La Junquera on 7 June, in which La Barre was killed. Augereau repulsed a Spanish attack on 13 August at the Battle of San-Lorenzo de la Muga. A long siege of Fort de Bellegarde ended on 17 September with a Spanish capitulation.

== Battle ==
=== Plans ===
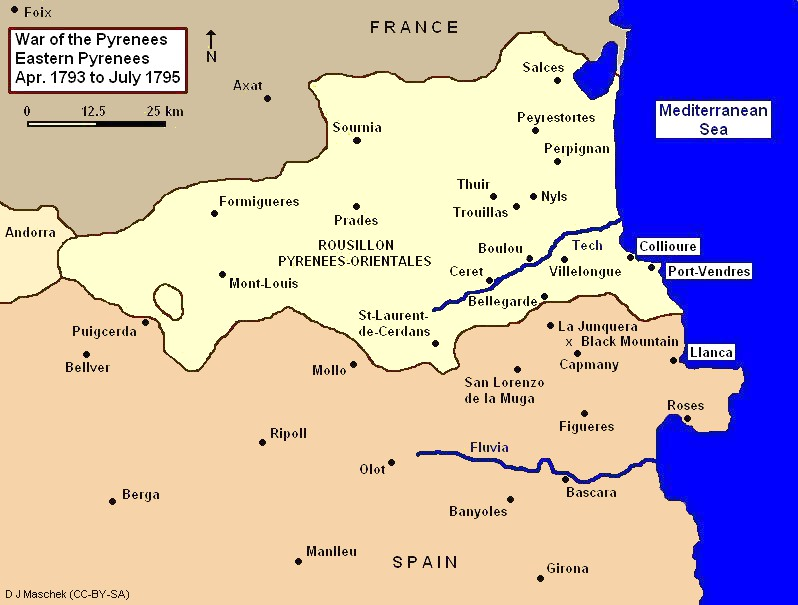
Map of the War of the Pyrenees

To shield Figueres, Roses, and the Alt Emporda, Lieutenant General Luis Firmin de Carvajal, Conde de la Union constructed a chain of 90 redoubts. The defenders included crack troops such as the three battalions each of the Spanish Guard and Walloon Guard Regiments. Lower quality troops such as provincial militia also manned the lines. De la Union was assisted by an allied Portuguese division under Lieutenant General João Forbes, which included one battalion each of the 1st, 2nd, Olivença, Cascais, Peniche, and Freire de Andrade Infantry Regiments.

Dugommier deployed a total 36,000 troops for his assault, including 22,000 in the first line. Augereau's division on the western flank had 9,000 men. Pérignon's 8,700 soldiers held the center and Sauret's 4,300 troops were on the east flank. The second line had 7,500 men and the third line contained 4,500 troops. A further 8,000 soldiers lay in reserve. De la Union deployed 45,000 to defend his fortified lines, including 10,000 second line reserves. Lieutenant General Juan de Courten had 10,000 troops to hold Sant Llorenç de la Muga, Magdalena Mountain, and Terrades on the western flank. Lieutenant General Juan Miguel de Vives y Feliu defended the eastern flank from Pont de Molins to the sea with 12,000 men. Lieutenant General Jerónimo Girón-Moctezuma, Marquis de las Amarilas held the centre with 23,000 soldiers.

=== Initial attack ===
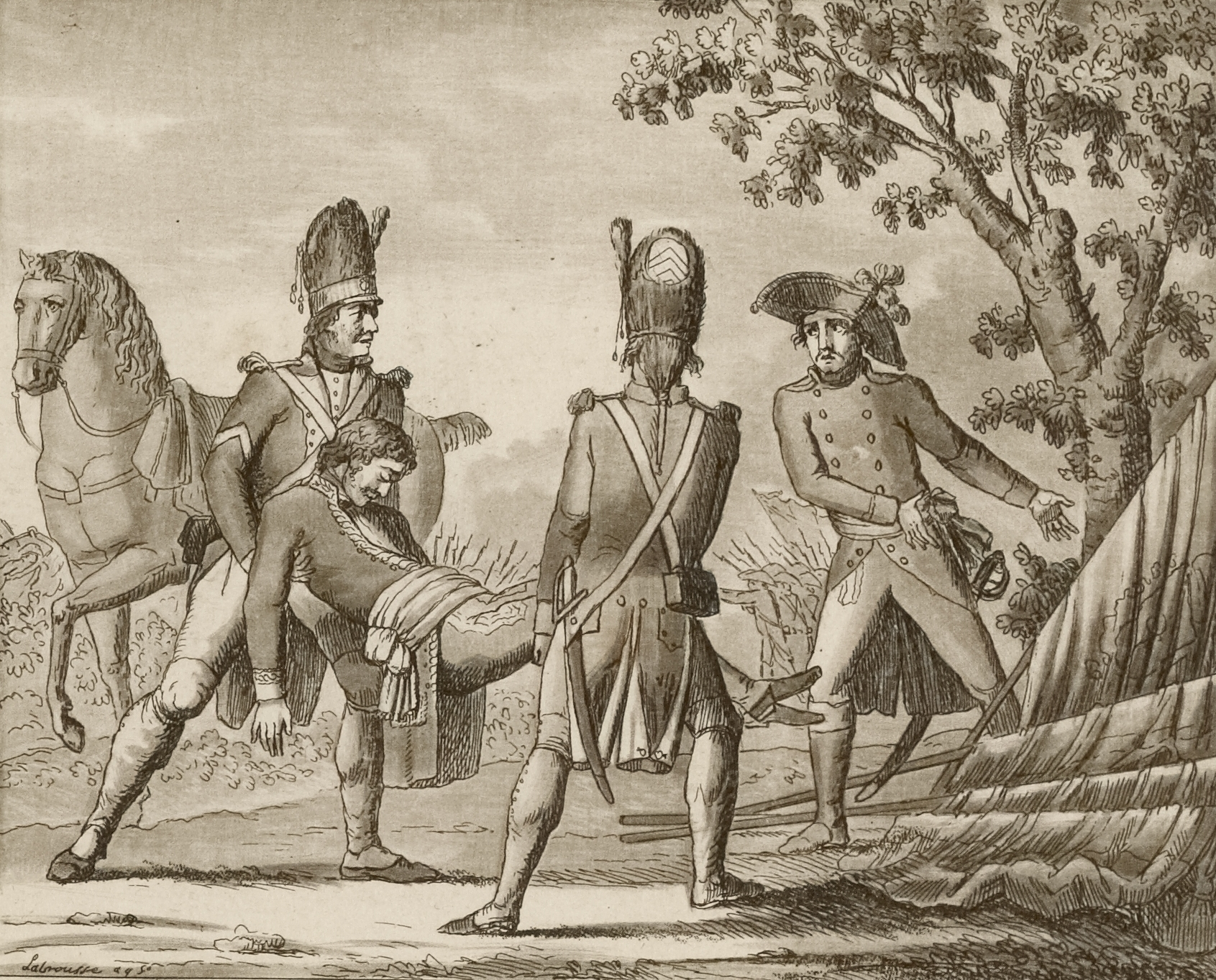
Contemporary print of Dugommier's death at the battle

Dugommier sent his divisions forward on the night of 16 November 1794. Augereau advanced on the right flank while Pérignon moved forward in the center, supported by General of Brigade Charles Dugua's cavalry reserve. Sauret and General of Brigade Claude Perrin Victor mounted feint attacks on the left flank. Augereau's attack on the cannon foundry in Sant Llorenç de la Muga and Terrades proved successful, forcing de Courten to pull back his Spanish and French Émigré troops toward Llers. Attacks by Pérignon in the center and Sauret on the left failed in the face of intense Spanish artillery fire from the area of Capmany. A force of Spanish cavalry and infantry under the French royalist Count of Ghent broke through Sauret's line to Cantallops but were driven back with the help of French reinforcements coming from the Pass of Banyuls in the east. On the morning of 18 November, Dugommier, Representative-on-mission Pierre Delbrel, and staff officers watched the combat from the summit of Montroig. The presence of a battery of French guns and the party of French officers drew considerable counter-battery fire from Spanish cannons. About 7:30 AM, an artillery shell exploded nearby and a fragment tore off Dugommier's arm, killing him.

=== Final attack ===
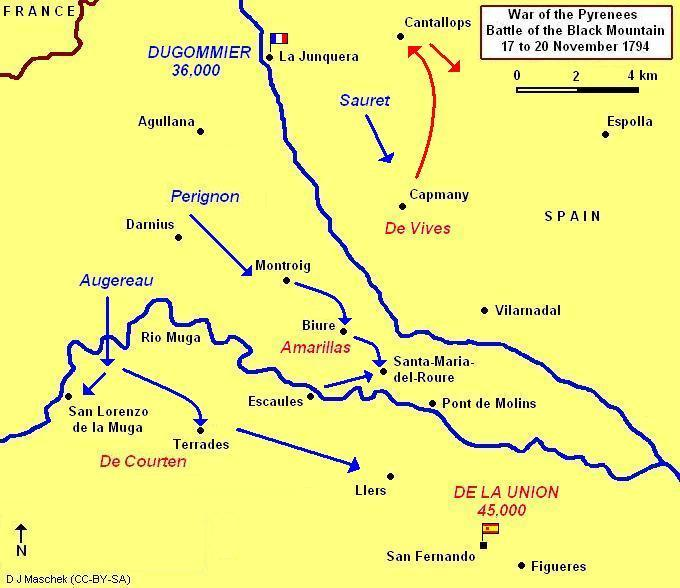
Map of the battle

Pérignon took over and called off the attack. On 18 and 19 November, the French council of war met at the La Junquera headquarters. After reorganizing his army, Pérignon determined to attack from the northwest along the valley running from Montroig to Biure. The attack began at dawn on the 20th and broke through the Spanish first and second lines. French troops soon began assaulting the 25-gun redoubt at the Santa Maria del Roure monastery, 2 kilometres (1.2 mi) northwest of Pont de Molins. The soldiers of General of Brigade Louis André Bon approached down the Muga valley from the direction of Escaules. Generals Gaspard Cagival and Diego Godoy (brother of Manuel Godoy) directed intense fire from the defenders that broke the French into small groups. Nevertheless, after being joined by General of Brigade François Guillot's brigade, they persisted in the attack for three hours. The fight turned against the Spanish and the position finally fell around 3:00 PM to an encircling maneuver.

During the early fighting on the 20th, de la Union remained at his headquarters in the San Fernando (Sant Ferran) fortress at Figueres. As he rode to the front, he received a report that the Santa Maria del Roure redoubt had fallen. Upon reaching Pont de Molins, he led a counterattack by 1,300 cavalry against the brigades of Generals of Brigade Théodore Chabert and Jean-Antoine Verdier. During the subsequent melee, de la Union was fatally hit by two bullets and fell about 300 metres (328 yd) from Santa Maria del Roure.

De Courten and General Domingo Izquierdo withdrew the left wing south to Bàscara, behind the Rio Fluvià, pursued by Verdier. An isolated force of 2,000 troops retreated from Llers to Figueres, where it joined Brigadier General José Andrés Lopéz Valdes' 7,000-man garrison of San Fernando Fortress. Numbers of wounded and stragglers from the battle also took refuge in the fortress. De las Amarillas took command of the badly shaken Army of Catalonia and marched toward Girona, leaving a rear guard to cover the retreat.

== Aftermath ==
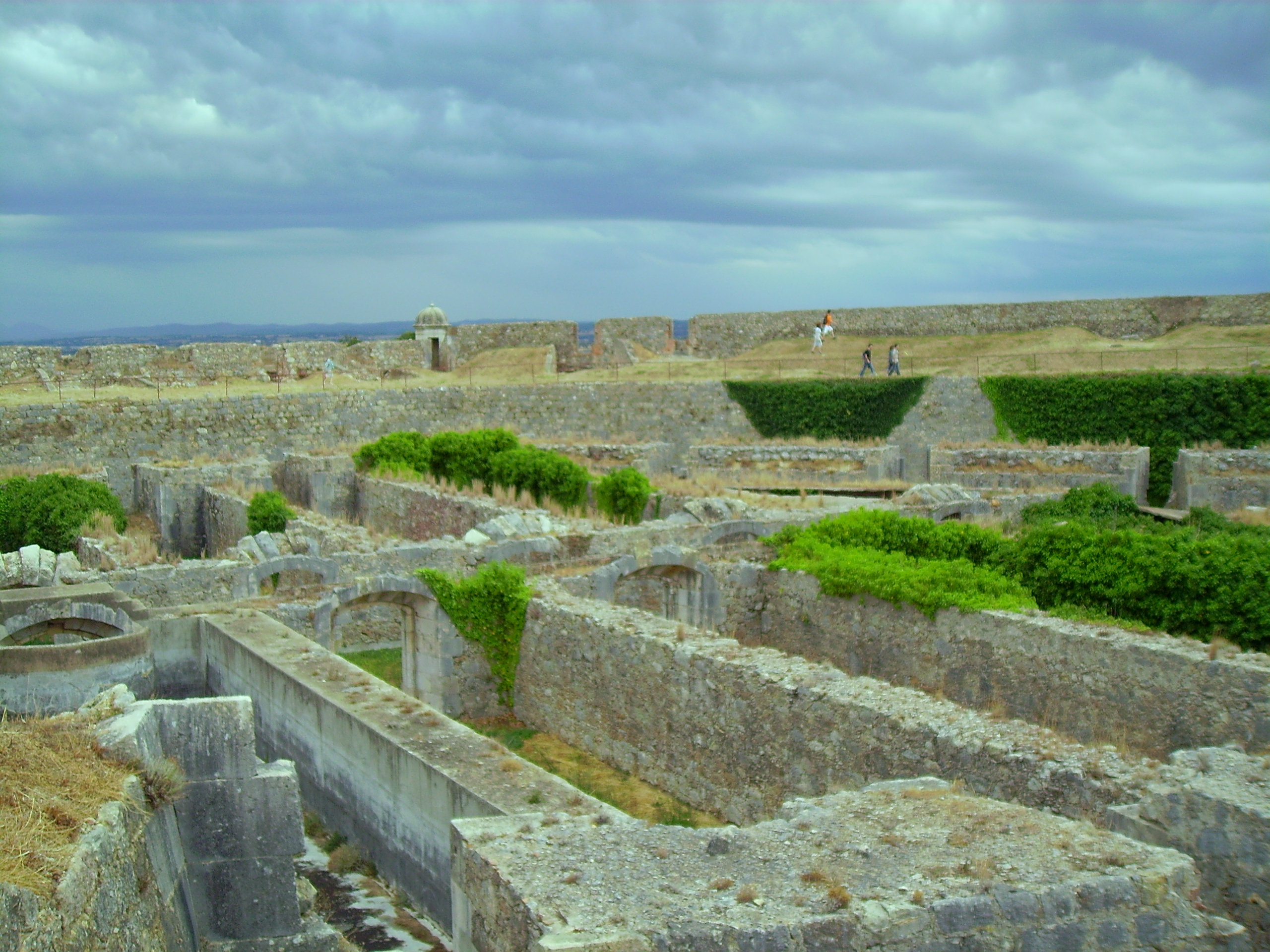
San Fernando Fortress

During the battle, the French lost 3,000 casualties out of 35,000 engaged. Spanish and Portuguese losses numbered 10,000 killed, wounded, and missing out of a total of 50,000 men. The French captured 30 artillery pieces. The French army quickly seized Figueres, but at first the fortress of San Fernando, which was 1.3 kilometres (0.8 mi) northeast of the city, defied them. On 27 November, Pérignon bluffed Valdes into surrendering the powerful fortress. The entire garrison of 9,000 soldiers and 171 artillery pieces fell into French hands. In December, de las Amarillas was dismissed for disgracefully abandoning San Fernando, and for blunders at the battles of Boulou and Peyrestortes. Lieutenant General José de Urrutia y de las Casas took command of the Allied field army, which lay behind the Fluvià. The next actions in the eastern Pyrenees were the Siege of Roses, which lasted until 4 February 1795, and the Battle of Bascara on 14 June.
