= Jerónimo Girón-Moctezuma, Marquis de las Amarillas =

Kingdom of Spain general officer (1741-1819)

- Born: 7 June 1741; Málaga, Spain
- Died: 17 October 1819 (aged 78) Seville, Spain
- Allegiance: Spain
- Rank: Lieutenant general
- Conflicts: French Revolutionary Wars; Battle of Peyrestortes; Battle of Boulou; Battle of the Black Mountain

Jerónimo Morejón Girón-Moctezuma, 3rd Marquis de las Amarillas, born 7 June 1741 at Málaga and died 17 October 1819 at Seville, became a general officer in the army of the Kingdom of Spain and commanded division-sized combat units during the War of the Pyrenees in 1793 and 1794. Though he attained high rank, becoming Viceroy of Navarre, he displayed limited military talent. Shortly after succeeding to the top command of the Army of Catalonia, he was dismissed for blunders made on the battlefield.

== Family ==
Girón was born into a noble family at Málaga on 7 June 1741. His father was Pedro Morejón Girón y Ahumada and his mother was Bernarda de Moctezuma y Salcedo, a descendant of Aztec Emperor Moctezuma II. On 22 October 1770, he married Isabel de las Casas y Aragorri, who was six years his junior. Upon the death of his father, Jerónimo Morejón Girón became the 3rd Marquis de las Amarillas. His son Pedro Agustín Girón y de las Casas, born in 1778, became the 1st Duke of Ahumada in 1836. Like his father, Pedro attained the rank of general officer in the army of Spain and fought in the Peninsular War, part of the Napoleonic Wars.

== War of the Pyrenees ==
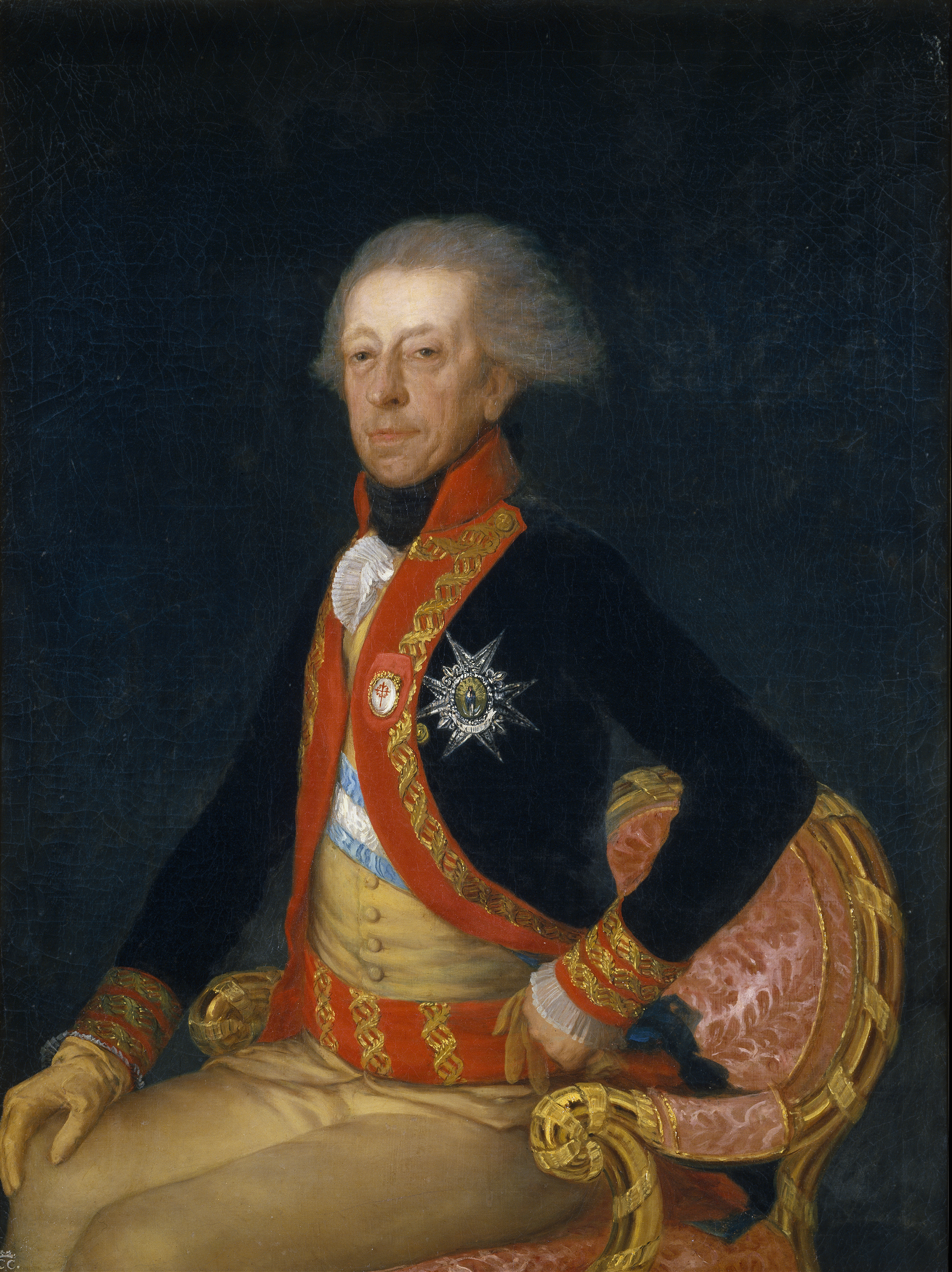
Antonio Ricardos

In April 1793, the Spanish Army of Catalonia led by Captain General (CG) Antonio Ricardos invaded Roussillon in the eastern Pyrenees during the French Revolutionary Wars. In May, the army opened the Siege of Bellegarde and captured the French fortress on 24 June. In early September 1793, Ricardos made a bid to capture Perpignan, the department capital.

Rather than mount a direct assault on the fortress, Ricardos swung two divisions around the western side of Perpignan to cut its communications with Narbonne. Lieutenant General (LG) Girón's division drove a French force out of Rivesaltes on 8 August. He then established a fortified camp on a hill just south of the village of Peyrestortes and six km northwest of Perpignan. Meanwhile, the division of LG Juan de Courten deployed only two km northwest of Perpignan, near Le Vernet. Ricardos began an artillery bombardment on the south side of the fortress. On the early morning of 17 September, the French Army of the Eastern Pyrenees under the temporary command of General of Division (MG) Eustache Charles d'Aoust attacked both Girón and de Courten in the Battle of Peyrestortes. The French were able to closely approach Girón's camp because he failed to post troops behind a ravine. The battle raged all day and into the evening, when both Spanish divisions withdrew after suffering heavy casualties. Ricardos retrieved the situation by a victory in the Battle of Truillas on 22 September. But Peyrestortes represented the high water mark of the Spanish invasion. After Truillas, Ricardos withdrew to the Tech River valley, where he successfully fended off several French attempts to drive the Spanish army across the border during the remainder of 1793.

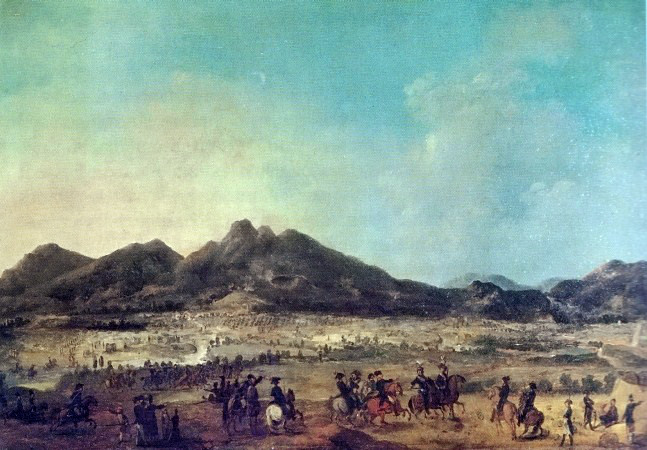
Battle of Boulou

In March 1794, both Ricardos and his designated successor CG Alejandro O'Reilly died. For a short time, Girón was the acting commander of the Army of Catalonia, but LG Luis Firmín de Carvajal was appointed to lead the army in April. LG Eugenio Navarro held Collioure and the area near the coast with the right division. LG Juan Miguel de Vives defended the left flank near Céret. Girón's center division, the largest, deployed to cover Le Boulou with a strongpoint at Montesquieu-des-Albères in the Pyrenees foothills to the east. On 29 April, the first day of the Battle of Boulou, the new French commander, MG Jacques François Dugommier successfully lured de la Union into pushing his left flank forward. With the Spanish army out of position, the French commander hurled a powerful attack at the Spanish right-center, breaking through Girón's right flank on 30 April. Countermeasures by de la Union and Girón failed to stem the French advance. On 1 May, the Spanish were forced to abandon the army's trains, artillery, and baggage, and retreat across the difficult Col de Porteille (800 meters altitude) rather than the easier Pass of Le Perthus (300 meters). After their victory, the French army blockaded the now-isolated Bellegarde.

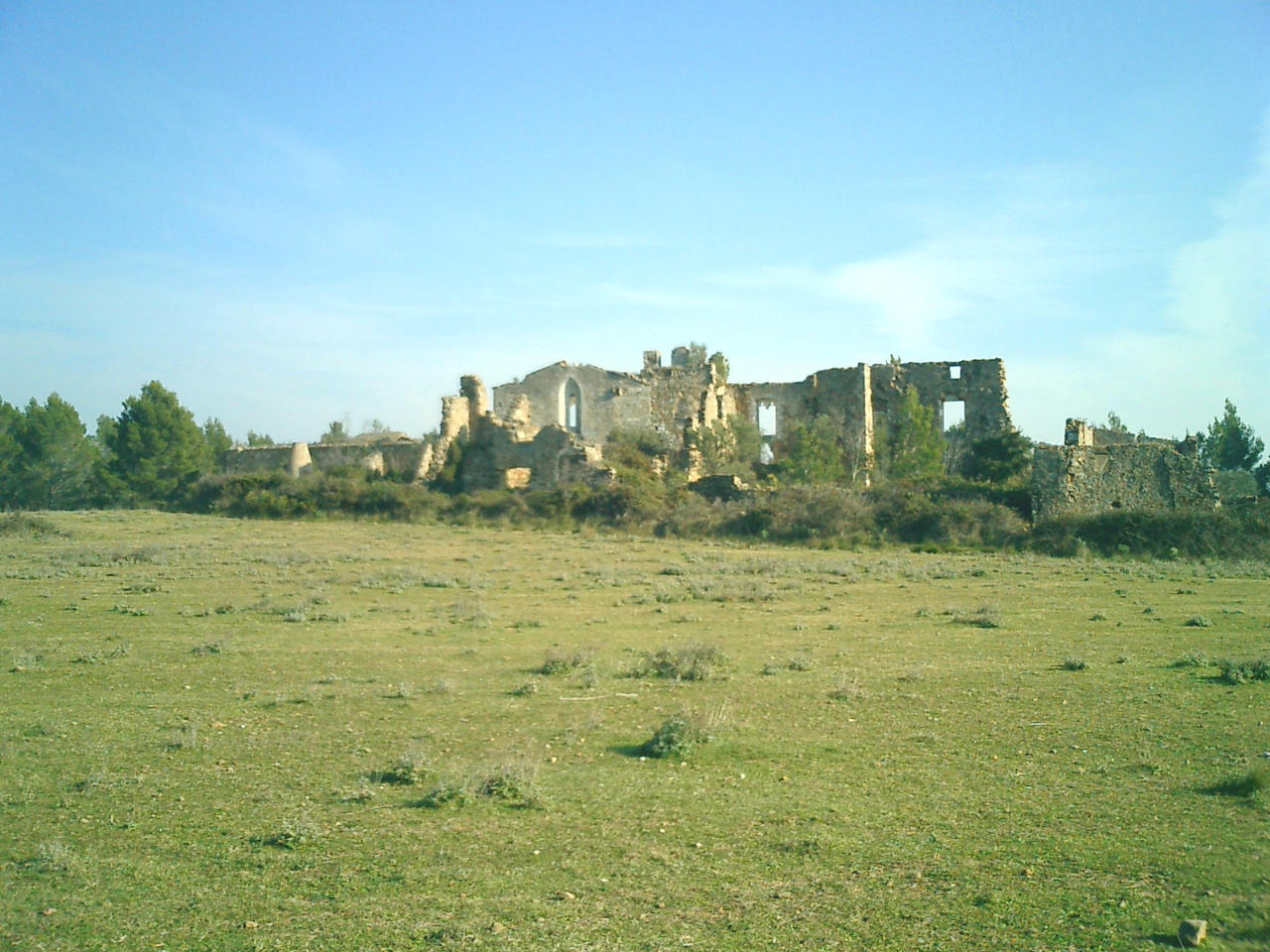
Ruins of Santa-Maria-del-Roure

De la Union, fell back south of the Pyrenees crest line and built a fortified line to cover the Alt Empordà. Girón led his division in an inconclusive action at La Jonquera on 7 June. An attempt by de la Union to relieve Bellegarde failed at the Battle of San Lorenzo de la Muga on 13 August. Bellegarde fell to the French on 17 September. The decisive Battle of the Black Mountain began on 17 November 1794, when the French launched a major assault. Girón in the center and de Vives on the right repulsed the enemy attacks, but MG Charles-Pierre Augereau collapsed de Courten's left flank. Dugommier was killed by a Spanish artillery shell on 18 November and the new French commander MG Dominique Pérignon paused to reorganize. When the French attacked again on 20 November, they cracked Girón's defenses in the center and captured the key Santa-Maria-del-Roure position. De la Union was slain while gallantly leading a Spanish cavalry charge and command of the army passed to Girón.

With de Courten's left wing out of the fight and his center division wrecked, Girón ordered a retreat. In the confusion, he left behind the city of Figueres and a 9,000-man garrison in the powerful fortress of San Fernando (Sant Ferran). The army withdrew behind the Rio Fluvià to reorganize its shattered units. Soon after, Pérignon bluffed the governor of San Fernando into surrendering and began the Siege of Roses. In December, Girón was dismissed from command of the Army of Catalonia for abandoning San Fernando fortress, and for errors committed at the battles of Boulou and Peyrestortes. He died on 17 October 1819 at Seville.

== Footnotes ==
Sources

- Ostermann, Georges (1987). "Perignon, The Unknown Marshal". In Chandler, David G. (ed.). Napoleon's Marshals. New York: Macmillan. ISBN 0-02-905930-5.
- "Marquis de las Amarillas Commandant-en-chef de l'Armee de Catalogne" by Bernard Prats (in French}
- "L'Assaut du Sanctuaire de la Madre de Deu del Roure by Bernard Prats (in French)
- Bataille du Boulou 1ère Partie by Bernard Prats (in French)
- "Bataille du Boulou (Fin)" by Bernard Prats (in French)
- Battle of Le Boulou by J. Rickard, historyofwar.org
- Smith, Digby (1998). The Napoleonic Wars Data Book. London: Greenhill. ISBN 1-85367-276-9.
