= Siege of Roses =

Siege of Roses or Siege of Rosas may refer to:

- Siege of Roses (1645), the French captured the port from Spain during the Franco-Spanish War (1635-1659)
- Siege of Roses (1693), the French quickly seized the city from the Spanish in the Nine Years' War
- Siege of Roses (1719), occurred during the War of the Quadruple Alliance
- Siege of Roses (1794-1795), the French captured the city from Spain during the War of the Pyrenees
- Siege of Roses (1808), the French took the port from the Spanish in the Peninsular War
