= Battle of Bascara (1795) =

Event during the War of the Pyrenees

Coordinates: 42.162°N 2.911°E

- Part of War of the Pyrenees
Date	14 June 1795
Location	Bàscara, Catalonia, Spain
Result	Spanish-Portuguese victory

Belligerents
Spain; Portugal	France

Commanders and leaders
(Spain) José de Urrutia; John Forbes	(France) Barthélemy Schérer

Units involved
Army of Catalonia; Auxiliary Army to the Crown of Spain	(France) Army of the Eastern Pyrenees

Strength
35,000	25,000

Casualties and losses
546	2,500, 4 guns

The Battle of Bascara on 14 June 1795 saw a Republican French army led by Barthélemy Louis Joseph Schérer clash with a Spanish Royal army commanded by José de Urrutia y de las Casas. While Scherer's army was on a foraging expedition, Urrutia believed that his army was under attack. The Spanish general quickly massed his troops and assaulted the French center, forcing it to withdraw. Bàscara is located 24 kilometres (15 mi) north of Girona, Spain. The fighting occurred during the War of the Pyrenees, part of the War of the First Coalition.

Under the command of Catherine-Dominique de Pérignon, the Army of the Eastern Pyrenees won a great victory at Black Mountain and captured two fortresses. However, subsequent operations were not successful and Pérignon was replaced by Schérer. The French government ordered the army to stand on the defensive. Though the French were beaten, Pierre Augereau's right flank division prevented a Spanish pursuit. Not long after the inadvertent action at Bàscara, the Peace of Basel was signed and the war ended.
