= Siege of Roses (1794–1795) =

French victory in the War of the Pyrenees

Coordinates: 42°16′N 3°11′E

Siege of Roses 1794–1795
- Part of the War of the Pyrenees
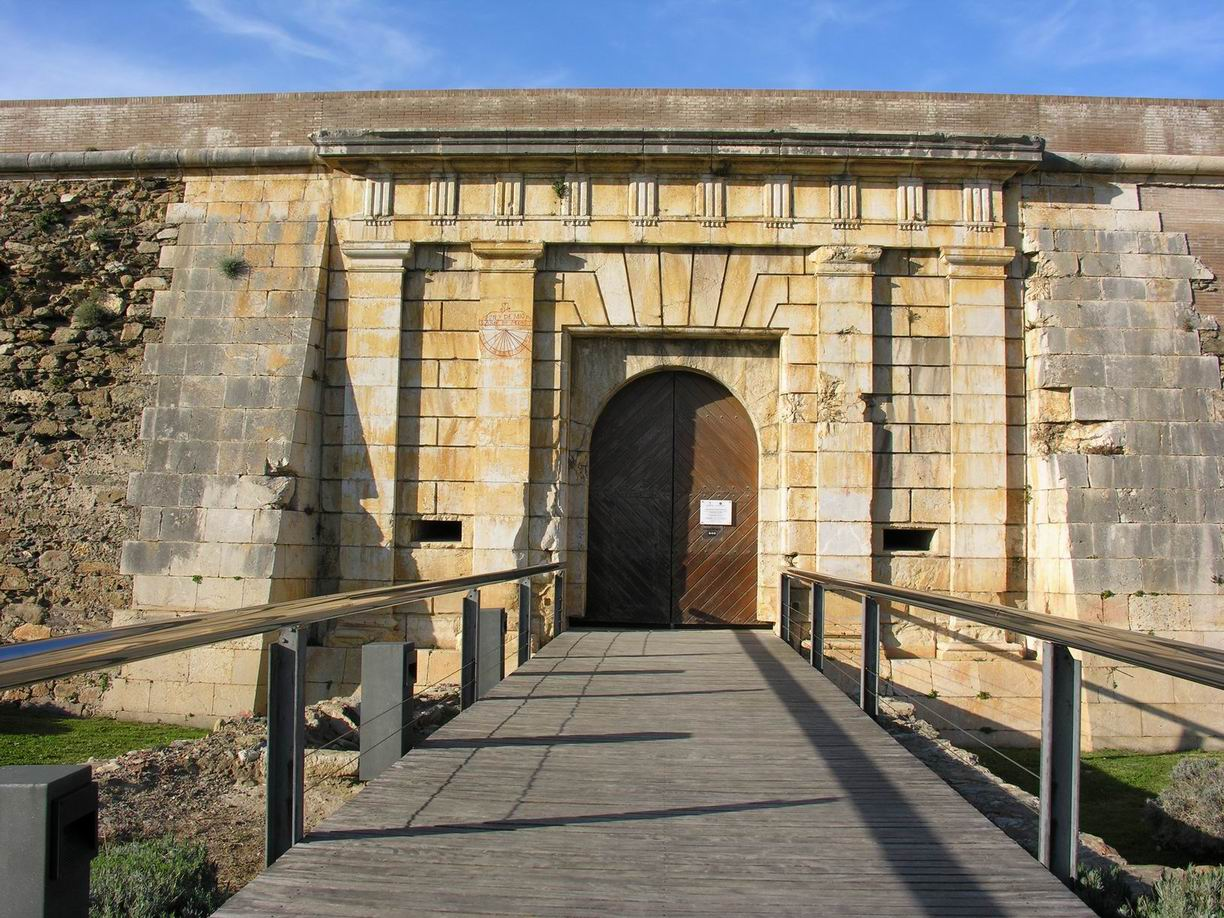
- Citadel of Roses: Sea Gate
| Date | 28 November 1794 – 4 February 1795 |
| Location | Roses, Catalonia, Spain |
| Result | French victory |

Belligerents
| France | Spain |

Commanders and leaders
| (France) Dominique Pérignon (France) Pierre Sauret | (Spain) Domingo Izquierdo |

Strength
| 13,261 | 4,800 |

Casualties and losses
| Light | 583 casualties 1,160 sick |

The siege of Roses (or siege of Rosas) began on 28 November 1794 and lasted until 4 February 1795 when the Spanish garrison abandoned the port and the forces of the French First Republic took control. Dominique Catherine de Pérignon commanded the French army and Domingo Salvator Izquierdo led the Spanish defenders. The siege took place during the War of the Pyrenees which was part of the French Revolutionary Wars. The war ended in July 1795 and Roses was soon restored to Spain. Roses is a coastal city in northeastern Spain, located 43 kilometres (27 mi) northeast of Girona, Catalonia.

The French inflicted a severe defeat on the Spanish army at the Black Mountain in November 1794. In the aftermath, the French army quickly captured Figueras and its fortress. At the same time, they undertook a formal siege of Roses. Pérignon and his lieutenant Pierre François Sauret soon realized that an outlying fort was the key to Roses and concentrated their energy on reducing it. A month after the fort fell, the Spanish fleet evacuated the garrison by sea.

== Background ==
On 17 November 1794, the French Army of the Eastern Pyrenees under General of Division Jacques François Dugommier attacked Lieutenant General Luis Firmin de Carvajal, Conde de la Union's Spanish army in the Battle of the Black Mountain. The French army routed their adversaries in a four-day combat in which both commanding generals were killed. General of Division Dominique Catherine de Pérignon assumed command of the French army and quickly occupied the city of Figueres. The French general bluffed Brigadier General José Andrés Valdes into surrendering the 9,000-man garrison of Sant Ferran Castle on 28 November. On the same day, General of Division Pierre François Sauret invested the port of Roses.

== Siege ==
=== Forces ===
The defenses of Roses consisted of a Vauban-type citadel (Ciutadella de Roses) and the Castell de la Trinitat. These fortifications were ordered by Charles V, Holy Roman Emperor in 1543 and completed by 1570. The citadel had a modified pentagonal shape with five bastions and demi-lunes on all sides except the sea side. The Castillo de la Trinidad was a 4-pointed star-shaped work on a 60 metres (197 ft) height. The citadel is located just west of the town while the castillo crowns a promontory 2.3 km south-southeast of the citadel. The 300-meter high Mont Puy-Bois dominated the Castillo on the northeast. Lieutenant General Domingo Salvator Izquierdo commanded the 4,800 men of the Spanish garrison. Admiral Federico Carlos Gravina y Napoli's fleet of 13 ships of the line and 45 other vessels lay in the Bay of Roses. These ships provided gunfire and logistic support to the garrison.

On 28 November the French invested Roses with 13,261 soldiers. While Sauret had immediate command over the besiegers, Pérignon remained the driving force in prosecuting the siege. Six brigades were subordinated to Sauret for the operation. The brigades were commanded by Generals of Brigade Claude Perrin Victor (2,455 infantry), Joseph Magdelaine Martin (1,747 infantry), Robert Motte (1,799 infantry), Jean-Jacques Causse (1,403 infantry), Théodore Chabert (2,118 infantry), and François Gilles Guillot (1,019 infantry and 123 cavalry). General of Division Jean Baptiste Beaufort de Thorigny's 2,586 infantry and 211 cavalry were in support at Castillon.

=== Action ===
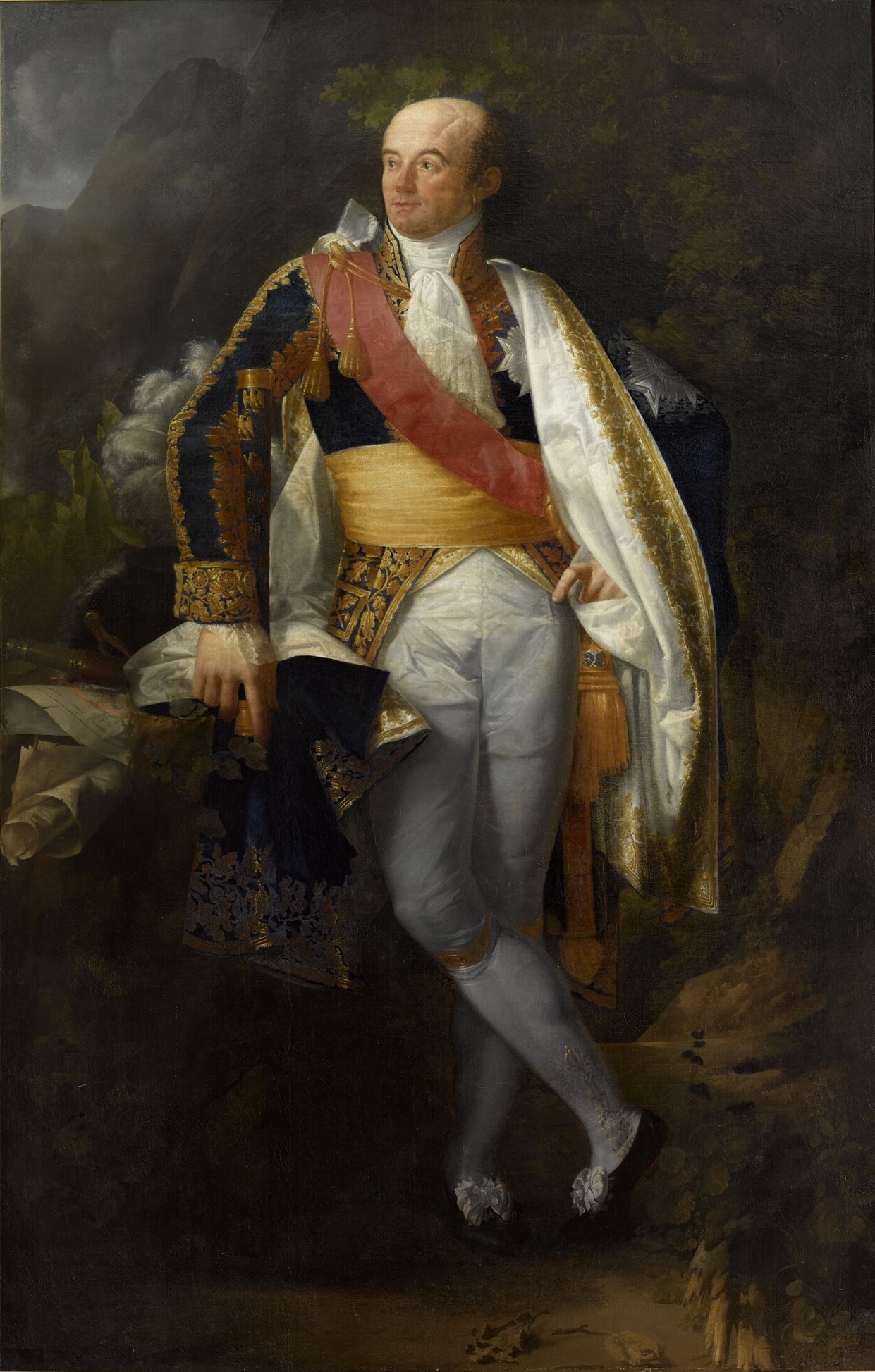
Dominique Pérignon

On 29 November, the first battery opened fire on the fortress and the French began digging siege trenches. By 7 December, six batteries were pounding the defenses. Izquierdo launched several ineffectual sorties at the French as their siege parallels drew closer to the citadel. By this time Pérignon realized that the Castillo de la Trinidad, whose fire caused serious damage to the besiegers, was the key position. He ordered that heavy guns be installed on Mont Puy-Bois. When the French engineers protested that it could not be done, the commanding general overrode their objections. The French soldiers, whose nickname for the Castillo was le Bouton de Rose (the Pimple), managed to haul three batteries to the summit by 25 December. The batteries on Mont Puy-Bois finally breached the walls of the Castillo and its garrison was taken off in boats on 1 January. From the newly captured position, the French opened fire on the citadel and the fleet.

Meanwhile, the army of Lieutenant General José de Urrutia y de las Casas held a position behind the Rio Fluvià to the south of Roses, threatening to advance to its relief. By 25 January, when wintry weather compelled Sauret to suspend siege operations, Urrutia's army had grown menacingly large. Determined to take the fortress, Pérignon decided to try bluff again. He stormed the Spanish advanced positions on 1 February. The French army commander staged obvious preparations for a full-scale assault, such as the display of scaling ladders in the trenches. This finally broke the morale of the defenders. Izquierdo ordered the surviving members of the garrison to be evacuated by Gravina's squadron on the night of 3 February, leaving a 300-man rear guard behind to cover the operation. The rear guard was supposed to be taken off in small boats in the morning, but they were abandoned by the fleet and became French prisoners.

== Results ==
The Spanish reported 113 killed, 470 wounded, and 1,160 sick during the siege. In addition, 300 soldiers fell into French hands. French losses are unknown but were claimed to be light. Annoyed that Pérignon was unable to advance beyond the Fluvià, the French government replaced him at the end of May 1795 with General of Division Barthélemy Louis Joseph Schérer. Urrutia defeated Schérer at the Battle of Bascara on 14 June. French losses numbered 2,500 while the Spanish army only lost 546 casualties.

The Peace of Basel on 22 July 1795 officially ended the fighting. Spanish forces under Lieutenant General Gregorio García de la Cuesta won two minor actions at Puigcerdà and Bellver de Cerdanya in late July, before news of the peace reached the front. The Second Treaty of San Ildefonso, in which Pérignon played a key role, followed on 19 August 1796. By this pact, Spain became an ally of France.

A subsequent siege of Roses happened in November and December 1808, during the Peninsular War. Previous sieges occurred in 1645 and 1693.
