= Théodore Chabert =

French politician

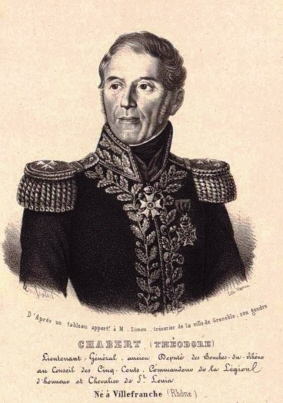
- Théodore Chabert
- Born: 16 March 1758; Villefranche-sur-Saône, France
- Died: 17 April 1845 (aged 87) Grenoble, France
- Allegiance: Kingdom of France; France
- Branch: Infantry
- Service years: (Kingdom of France) 1774–1792 (France) 1792–1815
- Rank: General of Division
- Conflicts: War of the First Coalition; Siege of Lyon; War of the Pyrenees; Battle of Boulou; Battle of the Black Mountain; Siege of Roses; War of the Second Coalition; Peninsular War; Battle of Bailén; War of the Sixth Coalition; Battle of Saint-Julien; Hundred Days
- Awards: Légion d'Honneur, CC 1804
- Other work: Baron of the Empire, 1809

Théodore Chabert (French pronunciation: [te.ɔdɔʁ ʃabɛʁ]; 16 March 1758 – 17 April 1845) became a French brigade commander during the French Revolutionary Wars. He enlisted in the French Royal Army in 1774. He was promoted lieutenant colonel at the Siege of Lyon in 1793. He joined the Army of the Eastern Pyrenees as a general of brigade and led his troops at Boulou, the Black Mountain and Rosas. He served with the Army of the Alps from 1795 to 1798 when he was elected a member of the Council of Five Hundred. He missed the fighting in 1800. He opposed Napoleon's appointment as Consul for Life in 1802.

Chabert was sent to Spain as a brigade commander in 1808. When Pierre Dupont de l'Etang's corps was surrounded after the Battle of Bailén, Chabert was one of the French generals who negotiated the capitulation. For this, Napoleon threw him in prison after the Spanish released him. After some time, he was released but remained unemployed and watched by the police. Yet, in 1809 he was appointed Baron of the Empire. In 1814 Chabert volunteered his services and fought at Saint-Julien. During the Hundred Days Napoleon promoted him general of division and appointed him to lead the 5th National Guard Division in Marshal Louis Gabriel Suchet's corps in the Alps. Under the Bourbon Restoration he was demoted. His surname is one of the names inscribed under the Arc de Triomphe, on Column 26.
