= Francisco Javier Girón, 2nd Duke of Ahumada =

The Duke of Ahumada OCIII OIC LCSF RMOSH OL OC
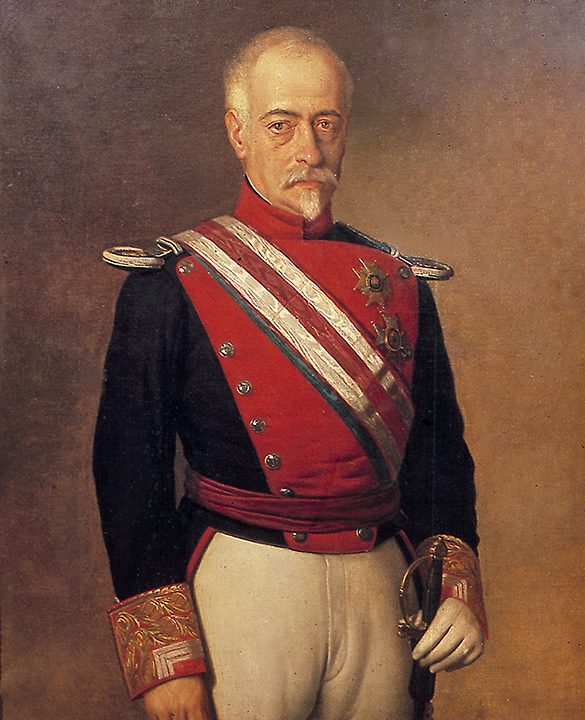
- Born: Francisco Javier Girón y Ezpeleta de las Casas y Enrile; March 11, 1803; Pamplona, Spain
- Died: December 18, 1869 (aged 66); Madrid, Spain
- Military career
- Allegiance: Spain
- Branch: Spanish Army
- Years of service: 1815-1869
- Rank: Lieutenant general
- Commands: Civil Guard; Halberdiers Company of the Royal Guard
- Battles: First Carlist War; La Vicalvarada
- Awards: Gentilhombres de cámara con ejercicio Order of Charles III; Order of Isabella the Catholic; Laureate Cross of Saint Ferdinand; Royal and Military Order of Saint Hermenegild; Order of Leopold; Order of Christ

Francisco Javier Girón, 2nd Duke of Ahumada (11 March 1803 - 18 December 1869) was a Spanish Army officer known for being the founder of the Civil Guard and its first director-general.

== Biography ==
=== Family ===
Girón was born in an important military-aristocratic family, the House of Girón, an ancient family that dates back to the 12th century. Girón was the son of Pedro Agustín Girón, 1st Duke of Ahumada and 4th Marquess of Amarillas. He was also a descendant of Pedro Téllez-Girón, better known as Pedro Girón, Master of the Order of Calatrava between 1445 and 1466. On the maternal side, he also belonged to a noble family traditionally linked to arms. His mother was Concepción Ezpeleta Enrile, who was the daughter of General José Manuel de Ezpeleta, 1st Count of Ezpeleta de Beire, who was Viceroy of Navarre and Viceroy of New Granada.

On behalf of his father, Girón was nephew of Luis de las Casas y Aragorri, Governor-General of Cuba and Captain-General of Cádiz and grandson of General Castaños. On the other hand, he was also a descendant of the Aztec emperor Moctezuma II, on the part of the mother of his paternal grandfather Jerónimo Girón y Moctezuma, 3rd Marquess of the Amarillas.

Likewise, on the mother's side, he was nephew of the José María Ezpeleta, 7th Marquess of Montehermoso, Fermín Ezpeleta and Joaquín Ezpeleta, all of them politicians and military, and nephew of Pascual Enrile y Alcedo, Governor-General of the Philippines.

Finally, he was the great-grandson of Jerónimo Enrile y Guerci, director of the General Asiento in Havana and 1st Marquess of Casa Enrile, and great-grandson of Simon de Aragorri y Olavide, a wealthy banker of French-Spanish origin who was Minister of Finance during the reign of Charles III and key man in the Court of Madrid, according to impressions of Alexander Humboldt during his trip to Spain in 1799.

=== Military career ===
The Spanish uprising against the French invasion led his father to the battlefield, where he would achieve honors and fame fighting Napoleon's troops. Girón remained in the house of his paternal grandfather, Jerónimo Girón y Moctezuma.

With such family, Girón entered in the Army very soon, at the age of 12. Girón was against the uprising of General Rafael del Riego in 1820 and that forced him to go to exile during the Liberal Triennium. After the restoration of absolutism in 1823, he came back from exile. In 1829 he was promoted to lieutenant colonel and assigned to Seville.

In 1831 he reached the rank of colonel —which supposed a double family joy, because said rise coincided with that of his father to captain general—, and in 1834 he was promoted to brigadier.

Under the orders of General Narváez he takes part in almost all the clashes that take place in Castile and Andalusia between the government army and the supporters of Infante Carlos María Isidro, brother of Ferdinand VII and uncle, therefore, of Isabella II. After the First Carlist War, his merits were recognized in campaign and loyalty to the Queen with the promotion to field marshal and the appointment as Inspector-General of the Army.

In 1842, when his father died, he assumed the titles of Marquess of the Amarillas, inherited from his grandfather, and of Duke of Ahumada, granted to his father by the Queen Governor, Maria Christina of the Two Sicilies.

=== Civil Guard ===
On 15 April 1844, the government led by prime minister Luis González Bravo entrusted him with the task of organizing a new law enforcement agency, the Civil Guard. The Duke was chosen because of his fame of an orderly person with an extraordinary capacity for work and meticulousness. The Duke dedicated all his efforts to create an effective police corp under the principles of courage, discipline, rigid instruction, dedication to others and subordination to established power.

The Duke of Ahumada was Director-General of the Civil Guard (at that time called Inspector-General) between 1844 and 1854 and from 1856 to 1858.

== Last years ==
The Duke entered in politics in 1844, being elected senator from Córdoba from 1844 to 1846 and from 1861 to 1862. During 1845 to 1846 Girón was life senator.

In November 1846 he was promoted to Lieutenant General and was named Commander-General of the Alabarderos Company of the Royal Guard. In possession of the most important decorations, obtained during a military career of more than half a century, the 2nd Duke of Ahumada and 5th Marquess of the Amarillas, died in Madrid on 18 December 1869, at the age of 66.
