= José Joaquín Virués =

Spanish army officer (1770–1840)

- Born: 27 July 1770; Jerez de la Frontera, Cádiz
- Died: 15 May 1840 (aged 69) Madrid
- Conflicts: War of the Pyrenees; War of the Oranges; First Battle of Algeciras; Peninsular War; Battle of the Gebora

José Joaquín Virués y López-Spínola (1770–1840) was a Spanish military commander. He was the younger brother of Lieutenant general Joaquín María Virués.

== Early career ==
Virués enlisted as a cadet in the Royal Guards in 1786. In 1793 he saw much action in the War of the Pyrenees and was promoted to colonel in 1795.

During the War of the Oranges, Virués served on the staff of Manuel Godoy, being promoted to Infantry brigadier in 1802. He then continued as a minister under Godoy until February 1805, when he was appointed governor of Motril. In April 1806, he was appointed governor of Sanlúcar de Barrameda, post he still held at the start of the Peninsular War.

== Peninsular War ==
In August 1808 he was promoted to field marshal, and in October, appointed interim governor of Cádiz, post he held until February 1809, when he was sent to London. On his return to Spain, Virués served in the Army of the Left under the orders of the Marquis of la Romana, and was appointed commanding officer of the Portuguese region of Campo Maior, Portugal, then garrisoned by Spanish troops. He later served on the Lines of Torres Vedras.

When Mendizábal was appointed commander-in-chief of the Army of the Left, Virués was given the command of the 2nd Infantry Division, which he led at the Battle of the Gebora, where he was taken prisoner, along with three brigadiers and at least half of the Spanish army there.

Taken before Joseph Bonaparte in Madrid, Virués acknowledged Joseph as King of Spain and was appointed his aide-de-camp. At the beginning of May 1813, while at Valladolid, King Joseph commissioned him to travel to Madrid discuss an armistice with the Spanish armies. However, Wellington's operations at that time precluded the mission and Virués had to leave for France.

== Post-war career ==
Virués was allowed to return to Spain in 1820, though he was not fully pardoned until 1830.
