= Joaquín María Virués =

Spanish army officer (1765–1829)

- Born: 5 September 1765; Jerez de la Frontera, Cádiz
- Died: 9 January 1829 (aged 63) Seville
- Conflicts: War of the Pyrenees; Anglo-Spanish War; First Battle of Algeciras; Peninsular War; Battle of Almonacid; Battle of Ocaña; Battle of Nivelle

Joaquín María Virués y López-Spínola (1765–1829) was a Spanish military commander. He was the elder brother of General José Joaquín Virués.

== Early career ==
Virués enlisted in the Provincial Regiment of Ronda in 1784. As a captain in 1792, he saw much action in the War of the Pyrenees and was promoted to lieutenant colonel in 1795.

During the Anglo-Spanish War (1796–1808), he was stationed in the Campo de Gibraltar and saw action at the First Battle of Algeciras.

In 1802 Virués was appointed colonel of his regiment, and spent the following two years garrisoning El Puerto de Santa María and Sanlúcar de Barrameda.

== Peninsular War ==
At the start of the war, Virués was garrisoned at Cádiz, where he participated in the Capture of the Rosily Squadron. Promoted to brigadier, in September he marched his regiment to Madrid, where he took part in its defence on 3 December.

Incorporated into Gaspar de Vigodet's 2nd Division of the Army of La Mancha, he saw action at the Battle of Almonacid and again at the Battle of Ocaña, before withdrawing to the Sierra Morena, where he stopped to defend Venta Nueva and Montizón, before withdrawing towards Granada and then Murcia, where he embarked his division to Cádiz.

In August 1812, he commanded the three regiments that made up the 2nd Division of Ballesteros's 4th Army. Following orders from the Regency, he accompanied Pedro de Alcántara Téllez-Girón, Prince of Anglona, to arrest Ballesteros, after the latter had called for a military uprising in protest against Wellington's appointment as generalissimo of the Spanish Army.

The following November he was given command of the 1st Division of the Duke del Parque's Army of Castille, and promoted to field marshal.

In 1813, he was given the command of the 1st Division of Pedro Agustín Girón's Army of the Reserve of Andalusia and fought at the Battle of Nivelle.

== Post-war career ==
During the Hundred Days, he served under Palafox in the Observation Army of Aragón.

During the Trienio Liberal he was appointed military governor of Seville in May 1820, a post he held until June of the following year. A few months later, he was appointed governor of Málaga, which he turned down.
