= Roure =

Roure may refer to:

== People with the surname ==
- David De Roure (born 1962), British professor
- Luis Alvarez Roure (born 1976), Puerto Rican painter
- Marta Roure (born 1981), Andorran singer and actress
- Martine Roure (born 1948), French politician
- Sergi Escobar Roure (born 1974), Spanish track cyclist

== Places ==
- Roure, Alpes-Maritimes, France
- Roure, Piedmont, Italy
- Vall-de-roures, also known as Valderrobres, Spain

== Other ==
- El Roure, local name used for the Monastery of Santa María del Roure in Catalonia, Spain
- Palais du Roure, Avignon, France
