= Joaquín Ezpeleta Enrile =

Spanish politician and Spanish Army general officer

Joaquín Ezpeleta OIC LCSF RMOSH
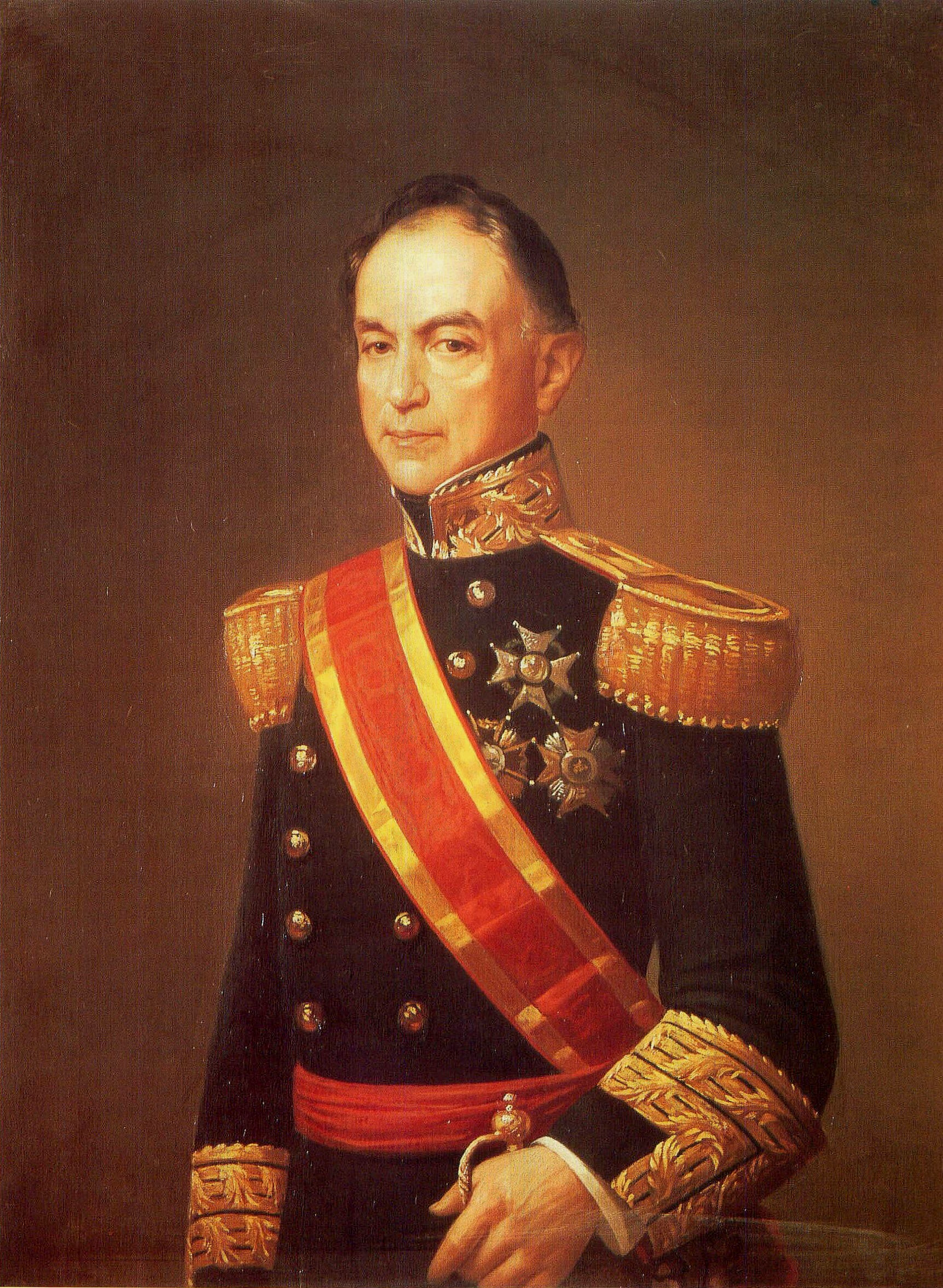

15th President of the Spanish Senate
- In office 12 February 1853 – 9 April 1853
- Monarch: Isabela II
- Preceded by: The Marquess of Miraflores
- Succeeded by: The Marquess of Viluma

Personal details
- Born: Joaquín Ezpeleta Enrile; September 19, 1788; La Habana, New Spain
- Died: March 24, 1863 (aged 74); Madrid, Spain
- Political party: Moderate Party
- Spouse: María de los Dolores de Contreras y Mencos
- Occupation: Army officer and politician
- Awards: Grand Cross of the Order of Isabella the Catholic; Laureate Grand Cross of Saint Ferdinand; Grand Cross of the Order of Saint Hermenegild

Military service
- Rank: General
- Battles/wars: Peninsular War; First Carlist War

Joaquín Ezpeleta Enrile (born 19 September 1788) was a Spanish politician and Spanish Army general officer who served as the 15th President of the Spanish Senate.

During his life, he served in many military and civil offices such as a member of the Cortes Generales, Minister of the Crown and Civil Governor of Jaen, Captain-General of Cuba, Captain-General of Catalonia or Viceroy of Navarre, among others.

== Biography ==
Ezpeleta was the son of the Count of Ezpeleta de Beire, Governor-General of Cuba from 1785 to 1789 and Viceroy of Nueva Granada from 1789 to 1797, and nephew of Pasqual Enrile y Alcedo, Governor-General of the Philippines. In late 1807 his father was appointed Captain-General of Catalonia and Ezpeleta was with him when the French troops, commanded by General Duhesme, attacked the city of Barcelona in 1808.

Ezpeleta was captured and moved to France but he escaped soon later and he re-enrolled into the Army, being captured again in 1812 and imprisoned until the end of the Peninsular War.

After returning to Spain he was promoted to colonel. In 1822, he was injured during the uprising of the Royal Guard who tried to restore the absolutism. In 1830, he was promoted to field marshal and destinated to the Royal Guard. Four years later, he was rewarded with the Grand Cross of the Order of Isabella the Catholic.

In 1835, he was appointed Civil and Military Governor of the Province of Jaén but the strength that the First Carlist War was acquiring forced that the Government destined him to the area of Navarre and the Ebro River to command the government troops. Ezpeleta helped General Espartero in the liberation of Bilbao and he secured some villages in Burgos and Biscay trying to stop the advance of the Carlist troops. This strategy did not success, but he achieves his objective in 1836 while helping General Santiago Méndez Vigo. He was injured in this last battle, being pulled out from combat. Next month, Ezpeleta was appointed Viceroy of Navarre and promoted to lieutenant general. Position that helped him to continue in the Carlist War.

In 1837, he was appointed second-in-command to the Captain-General of Cuba and a year later he was promoted to Captain-General of Cuba until 1840, when he resigned for health issues. During his time as Captain-General he organized a fire brigade and he promoted the establishment of savings banks and the laying of railway lines, being rewarded for such advances with the Laureate Grand Cross of Saint Ferdinand, by royal decree of September 24, 1838.

He combined his military career with his political career, being elected MP for Navarre in 1834 and 1836, and life senator since 1845. From January to June 1852, he was Minister of War, and from June to December of the same year Minister of the Navy. Briefly, during February and April 1853 he served as President of the Senate.

Ezpeleta was married to María de los Dolores de Contreras y Mencos, daughter of the Marquess of Lozoya. His brothers, Jose María and Fermin were also soldiers and politicians. His sister, María Concepción, married General Pedro Agustín Girón, meaning that Ezpeleta is the uncle of the 2nd Duke of Ahumada, founder of the Civil Guard.
