= John Forbes (Portuguese general) =

Portuguese Army officer

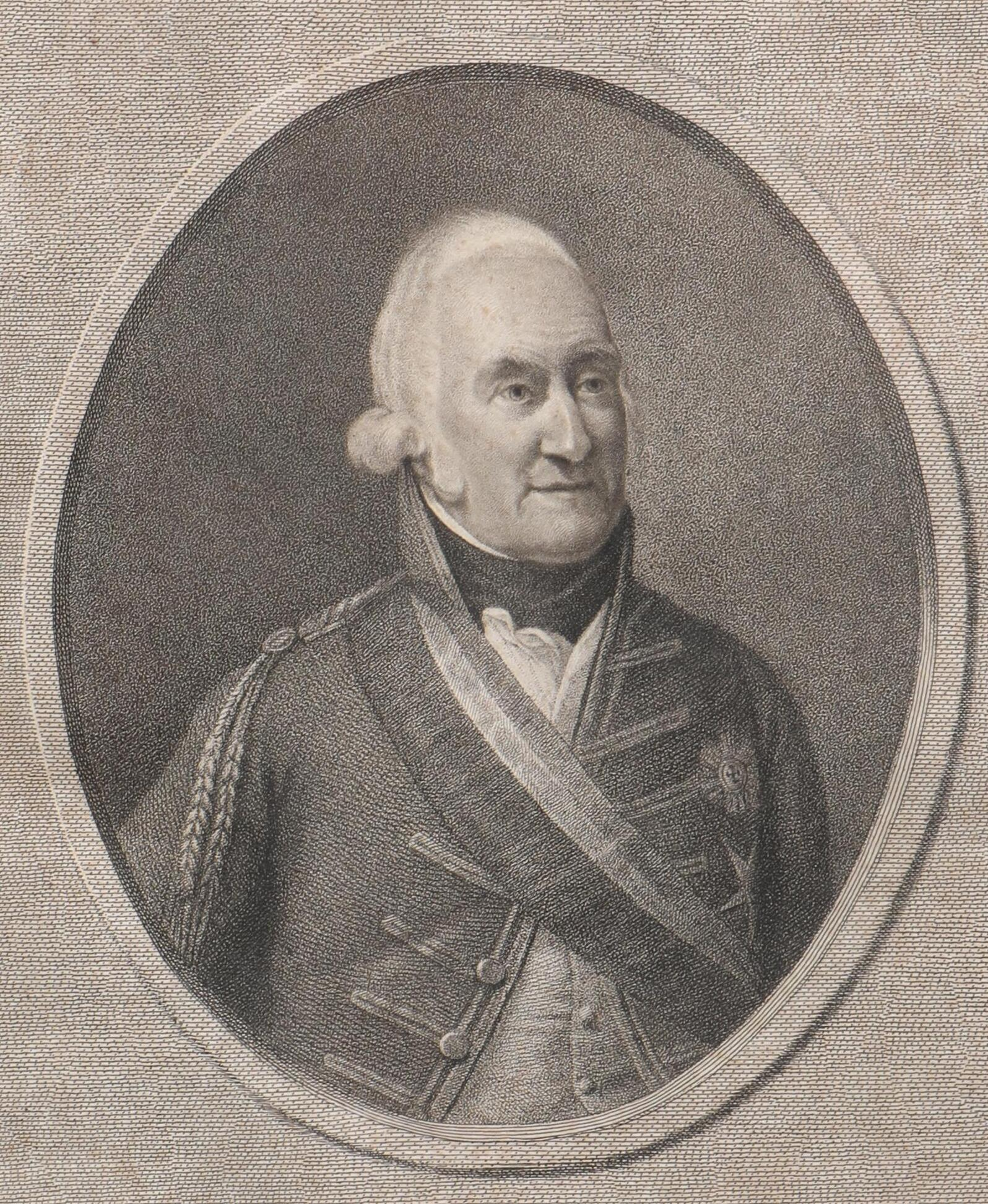
- Engraving by Francesco Bartolozzi after a Domenico Pellegrini portrait, 1812
- Born: 1719/1733; Aberdeenshire, Scotland
- Died: 8 April 1806; Rio de Janeiro, Brazil
- Military career
- Allegiance: Portugal
- Branch: Portuguese Army
- Service years: 1748–1808
- Rank: General
- Conflicts: War of the Austrian Succession; Siege of Maastricht (1748); Seven Years' War; Spanish invasion of Portugal (1762); French Revolutionary Wars; War of the Pyrenees; Battle of Villelongue; Second Battle of Boulou; First Battle of Sant Llorenç de la Muga; Battle of the Black Mountain; Battle of Bascara (1795)

General John Forbes (1719/1733 – 8 April 1808) was a Portuguese Army officer who served in the War of the Austrian Succession, Seven Years' War and French Revolutionary Wars.

== Biography ==
Forbes was born in 1719 or 1733, in Aberdeenshire, the only son of George Forbes. (Note: H. Morse Stephens, in the biographical entry he wrote for Dictionary of National Biography (1885–1900), states the father's name was Patrick.) He began his military career at the age of 15 as a volunteer at the siege of Maestricht, and was successful in winning a commission. He was essentially a soldier of fortune, and when Portugal applied to Britain for officers to reorganise the Portuguese Army under the Count of Lippe Buckeburg, Forbes was one of the first to volunteer. Promoted to lieutenant in 1747, and to captain in 1756. Forbes remained in Portugal after the termination of the Seven Years' War (1756–1763); as a Roman Catholic who had married a Portuguese lady, he had no difficulty in getting employment. He took part in the defense of Portugal during the failed Franco-Spanish invasions of Portugal in 1762.

In 1763, Count Lippe gave him command of a company of Grenadiers in the Peniche Regiment, a great honour as these companies were then an elite corps. In 1766, he was promoted to lieutenant colonel of that regiment and the following year to full colonel of the Almeida Cavalry Regiment. In 1773 he was transferred to the Elvas Regiment. In 1775, he was promoted to brigadier, whilst retaining the colonelcy and command of the Bragança Cavalry Regiment. In 1778, he was appointed military governor of the province of Beira. He served for many years as adjutant-general of the Portuguese army, but at last, in 1789, he was asked to resign, the object of some jealousy of the Portuguese officers. In 1793, he was made a knight of the order of Aviz, and promoted to lieutenant general.

When Portugal decided to join the French Revolutionary Wars, Forbes was given command, replacing the Marquis de Minas, his old commander in the 1762 campaigns, who had fallen ill of the 5,000-strong division which, together with a 22-gun brigade of Artillery, was sent as an expeditionary force to assist the Spanish army in the War of the Pyrenees (1793–1795). Setting sail from the estuary of the Tagus towards the end of September 1793, the expedition, accompanied by several high-ranking volunteers, including Admiral Domingos Xavier de Lima, 7th Marquis of Nice; Hugh Percy, 2nd Duke of Northumberland and the Prince de Montmorency, arrived at Roses on 9 November. From 27 to 29 November 1807, Forbes accompanied Queen Mary I, the prince regent, and the court when they fled from the forces led by Jean-Andoche Junot which entered Lisbon. On arrival in Brazil, he was appointed military governor of Rio de Janeiro on 2 April 1808, two days before he died on 8 April. (Note: Pinheiro Chagas states May.)
