= Pedro Agustín Girón =

Spanish military officer and politician

The Most Excellent The Duke of Ahumada
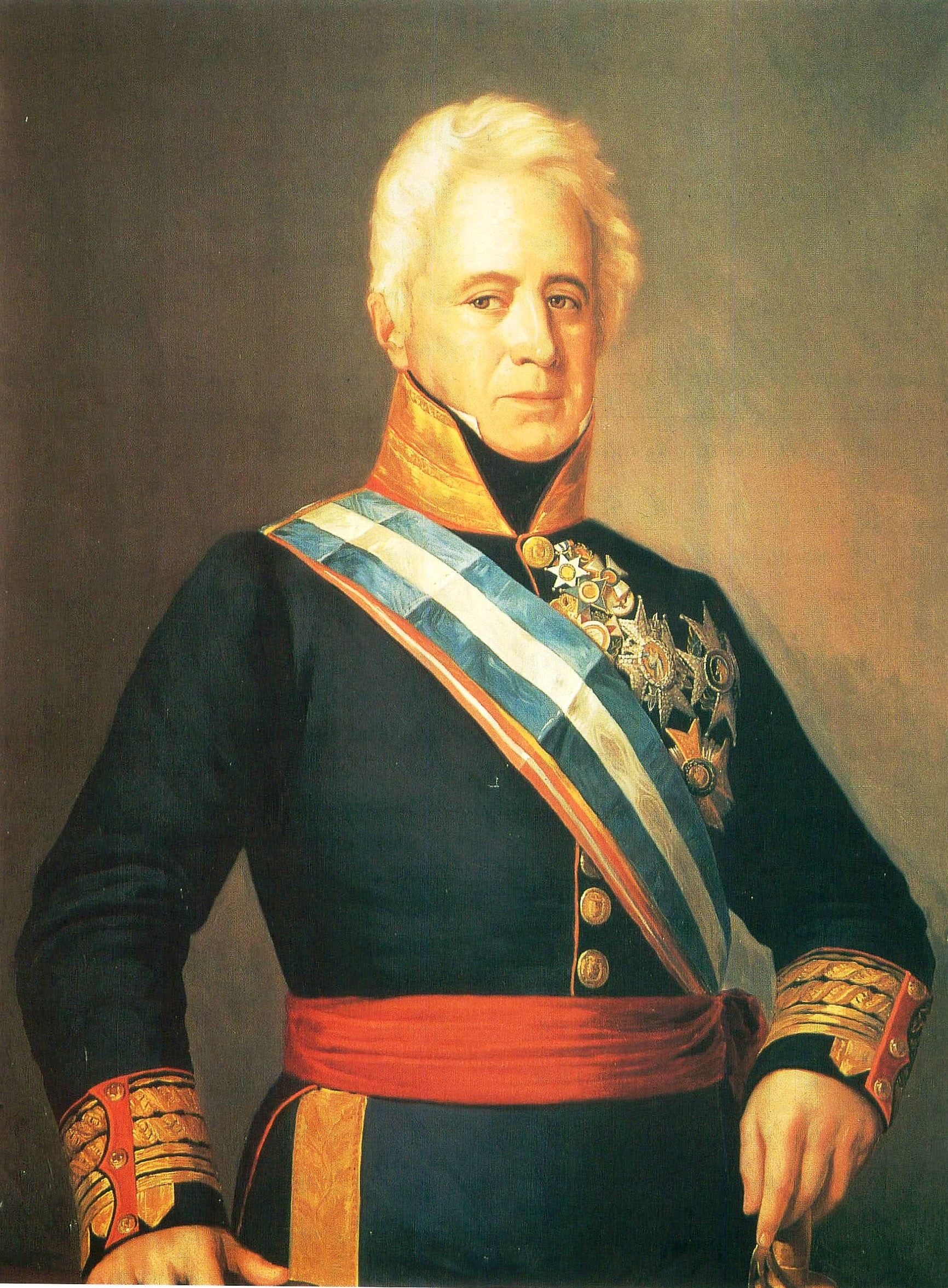
- Portrait by Francisco Jover y Casanova

Personal details
- Born: 2 January 1778
- Died: 17 May 1842 (aged 64)

Military service
- Allegiance: Spain
- Rank: Lieutenant General
- Battles/wars: War of the Pyrenees; Peninsular War; Battle of Bailén; Battle of Tudela; Battle of Uclés; Battle of Albuera; Battle of the Bidassoa

Pedro Agustín Girón y de las Casas, 1st Duke of Ahumada, 4th Marquis of the Amarillas (1778–1842) was a Spanish military officer and politician.

The son of a general, he fought against the French during the French Revolutionary Wars. During the Napoleonic Wars he became a general officer and again fought the French. In later life he held military and political positions.

== Biography ==
=== Early career ===
Born into a noble family in San Sebastián in 1778, Pedro Agustín Girón's father was Jerónimo Girón-Moctezuma, 3rd Marquis de las Amarilas and his mother Isabel de las Casas y Aragorri. He was a tenth generation descendant of Aztec emperor Moctezuma II. He became an official of the Royal Guard and participated in the War of the Pyrenees in the Army of Catalonia, in which his father was a high-ranking general.

=== Peninsular War ===
After emperor Napoleon invaded Spain and overthrew the monarchy, Girón offered his services to the national forces; in July 1808 he participated in the Battle of Bailén in Jaén, a major Spanish victory. Later that year, he fought at the Battle of Tudela in Navarre, at which the Spanish army was heavily defeated. He was also part of the battles of Uclés (1809), Ciudad Real (1809) and Albuera (1811). Most of them were led by his uncle, general Francisco Javier Castaños, 1st Duke of Bailén.

In 1813, the French forces were driven out of Spain after the Battle of Vitoria, which Girón missed because his troops moved in the direction of Bilbao. On 7 October 1813, at the Battle of the Bidassoa, Girón commanded the two divisions of Generals Virues and La Torre. Though the Spanish repeatedly attacked the French defenses at Larrun (905 meters alt.), they failed to capture the position. The Marquess of Wellington praised his allies' performance, writing that the Spanish attacked, "in as good order and with as much spirit as any that I have seen made by any troops." The French abandoned the peak the next day to avoid being trapped. Girón also led the two divisions, with 7,653 soldiers in all, at the Battle of Nivelle on 10 November, where his troops helped take the fortified village of Sare.

=== Post-war career ===
When his father died in 1819, Girón became the 4th Marquis of Amarilas. A moderate liberal in the political plain, after the liberal revolution of 1820, he was named Minister of War for the Government under Evaristo Pérez de Castro. However he resigned a few months later because of the opposition of the more radical liberal sector.

In 1832, in the last years of the reign of Ferdinand VII, he was appointed captain-general of Granada. In 1835 he was created Duke of Ahumada and, that same year, he was appointed Minister of War again, but was forced to resign after being accused of nepotism. During the last few years of his life he spent many years traveling abroad, spending his time to study and writing. His memoirs Memories 1778-1837 offers an insight into his life.

He died on 17 May 1842, aged 64. He was succeeded in all his noble titles by his elder son, Francisco Javier Girón, known for being the founder of the Civil Guard in 1844.

== Bibliography ==
- Glover, Michael (2001). The Peninsular War 1807-1814. London: Penguin. ISBN 0-14-139041-7
- Smith, Digby (1998). The Napoleonic Wars Data Book. London: Greenhill. ISBN 1-85367-276-9
