= Army of the Pyrenees =

One of the French Revolutionary armies, the Army of the Pyrenees (Armée des Pyrénées) was created by a decree of the National Convention dated 1 October 1792 and formed out of the right wing of the Armée du Midi. At the outbreak of the War of the Pyrenees with the Kingdom of Spain, a decree of 30 April 1793 separated the Armée des Pyrénées into the Army of the eastern Pyrenees (Armée des Pyrénées orientales) and the Army of the western Pyrenees (Armée des Pyrénées occidentales).

== Commanders ==
- General Joseph Servan de Gerbey, 3 October 1792 – 16 February 1793
- General Louis Dubouquet, 17 February – 4 April 1793 (interim)
- General Servan de Gerbey, 5 April 1793 – 30 April 1793
  - General Mathieu Henri Marchant de La Houlière, from 17 April commander of the eastern division, committed suicide shortly after the loss of Céret on 20 April
  - General Claude Souchon de Chameron, 25 April (provisional)

== Sources ==
- La Prise de Ceret par le Comte de la Union by Bernard Prats in French
