= Pont de Molins =

- Municipality
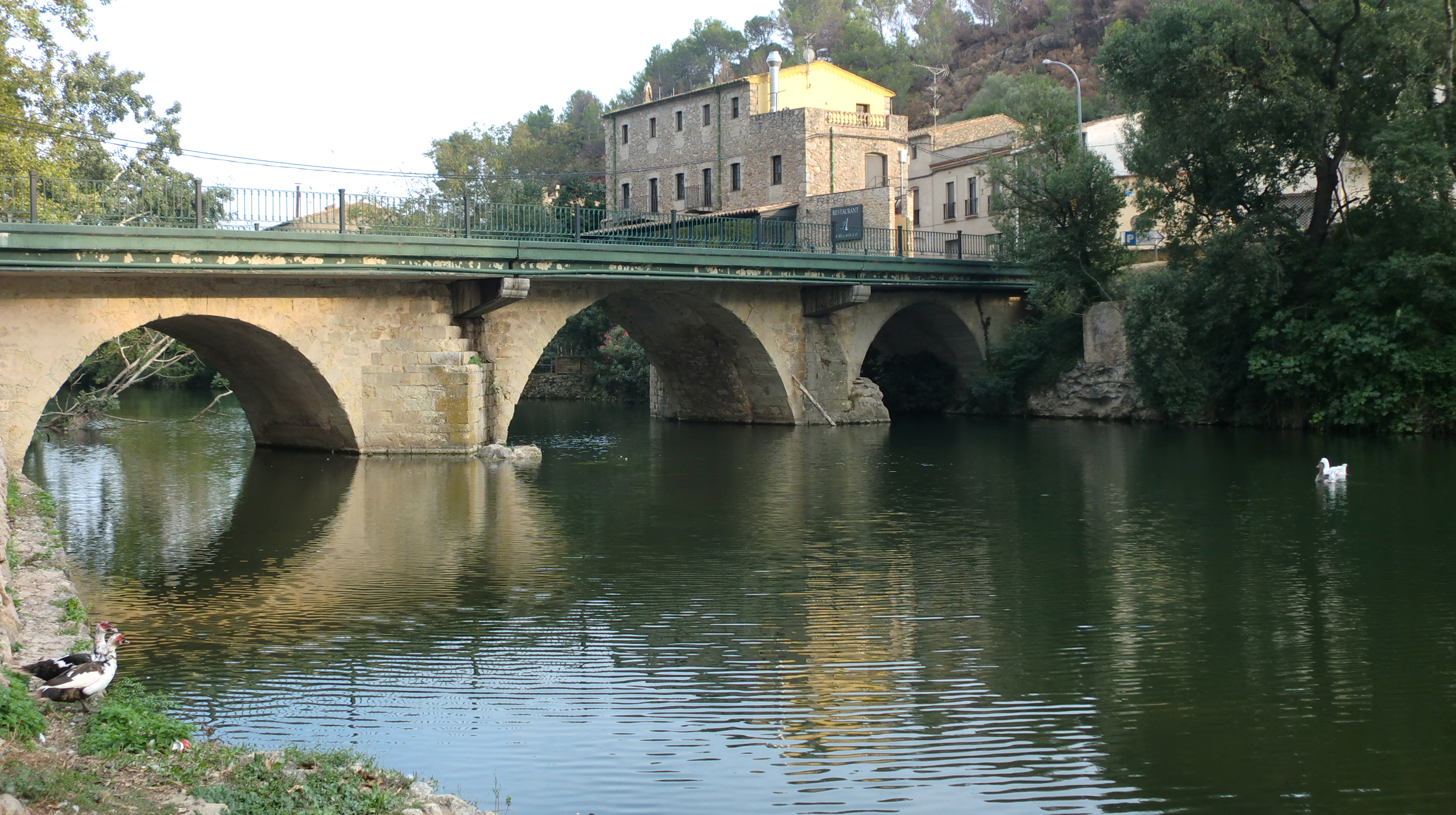
- Old bridge and Muga river

- Flag Coat of arms

- Location in Catalonia Pont de Molins (Spain)
- Coordinates: 42°18′53.5″N 2°55′54″E
- Country: Spain
- Community: Catalonia
- Province: Girona
- Comarca: Alt Empordà

Government
  - Mayor: Josep Fuentes Jiménez (2015) (CiU)

Area
  - Total: 8.7 km^{2} (3.4 sq mi)
- Elevation: 36 m (118 ft)

Population (2025-01-01)
  - Total: 585
  - Density: 67/km^{2} (170/sq mi)
- Demonym(s): Molinencs, Molinenques
- Postal code: 17135
- Website: pontdemolins.cat

Pont de Molins (Catalan pronunciation: [ˈpon də muˈlins]) is a municipality in the comarca of Alt Empordà, Girona, Catalonia, Spain. The ruins of the Monastery of Santa María del Roure are to the northwest.
