= Duke of Ahumada =

- Creation date: 6 June 1835
- Created by: Isabella II
- Peerage: Spanish nobility
- First holder: Pedro Agustín Girón, 4th Marquess of Amarillas
- Present holder: Francisco Javier Chico de Guzmán y Girón
- Heir apparent: Francisco Javier Chico de Guzmán y March
- Remainder to: heirs of the body of the grantee according to absolute primogeniture
- Subsidiary titles: Marquess of Amarillas
- Status: Extant

Duke of Ahumada (Spanish: Duque de Ahumada) is a hereditary title of Spanish nobility, accompanied by the dignity of Grandee. It was created on 6 June 1835 by Queen Isabella II (in her name, the Regent, Queen Maria Christina) in favor of Army general Pedro Agustín Girón, 4th Marquess of Amarillas, minister of War.

This family descends from both the Aztec emperor Moctezuma II and Louis XIV, but became especially well-known thanks to the 2nd duke, who founded the Civil Guard in 1844.

== Dukes of Ahumada ==
1. Pedro Agustín Girón y de las Casas, 1st Duke of Ahumada (1835–1842)
2. Francisco Javier Girón y Ezpeleta, 2nd Duke of Ahumada (1842–1866)
3. Pedro Agustín Girón y Aragón, 3rd Duke of Ahumada (1872–1910)
4. Agustín Girón y Aragón, 4th Duke of Ahumada (1910–1925)
5. Ana María Girón y Canthal, 5th Duchess of Ahumada (1926–1972)
6. Francisco Javier Chico de Guzmán y Girón, 6th Duke of Ahumada (1973–)

== Line of succession ==
- Pedro Agustín Girón y de las Casas, 1st Duke of Ahumada, 4th Marquess of Amarillas (1778–1842)
  - Francisco Javier Girón y Ezpeleta, 2nd Duke of Ahumada, 5th Marquess of Amarillas (1803–1869)
    - Pedro Agustín Girón y Aragón, 3rd Duke of Ahumada, 6th Marquess of Amarillas (1835–1910)
    - Agustín Girón y Aragón, 4th Duke of Ahumada, 7th Marquess of Amarillas, 13th Viscount of the Torres de Luzón (1843–1925)
    - Luis María Francisco Javier Girón y Aragón (1845–1911)
      - Francisco Javier Girón y Méndez de Castro, 4th Marquess of Ahumada (1877–1924)
        - Ana María Girón y Canthal, 5th Duchess of Ahumada, 8th Marchioness of Amarillas, 5th Marchioness of Ahumada (1917–1972)
          - Francisco Javier Chico de Guzmán y Girón, 6th Duke of Ahumada, 9th Marquess of Amarillas (b. 1944)
            - Francisco Javier Girón y Méndez de Castro, 10th Marquess of Amarillas (1971–2012)
              - (1). Álvaro Chico de Guzmán Boyer, 11th Marquess of Amarillas (b. 2001)
