= Second Treaty of San Ildefonso =

1796 treaty between France and Spain

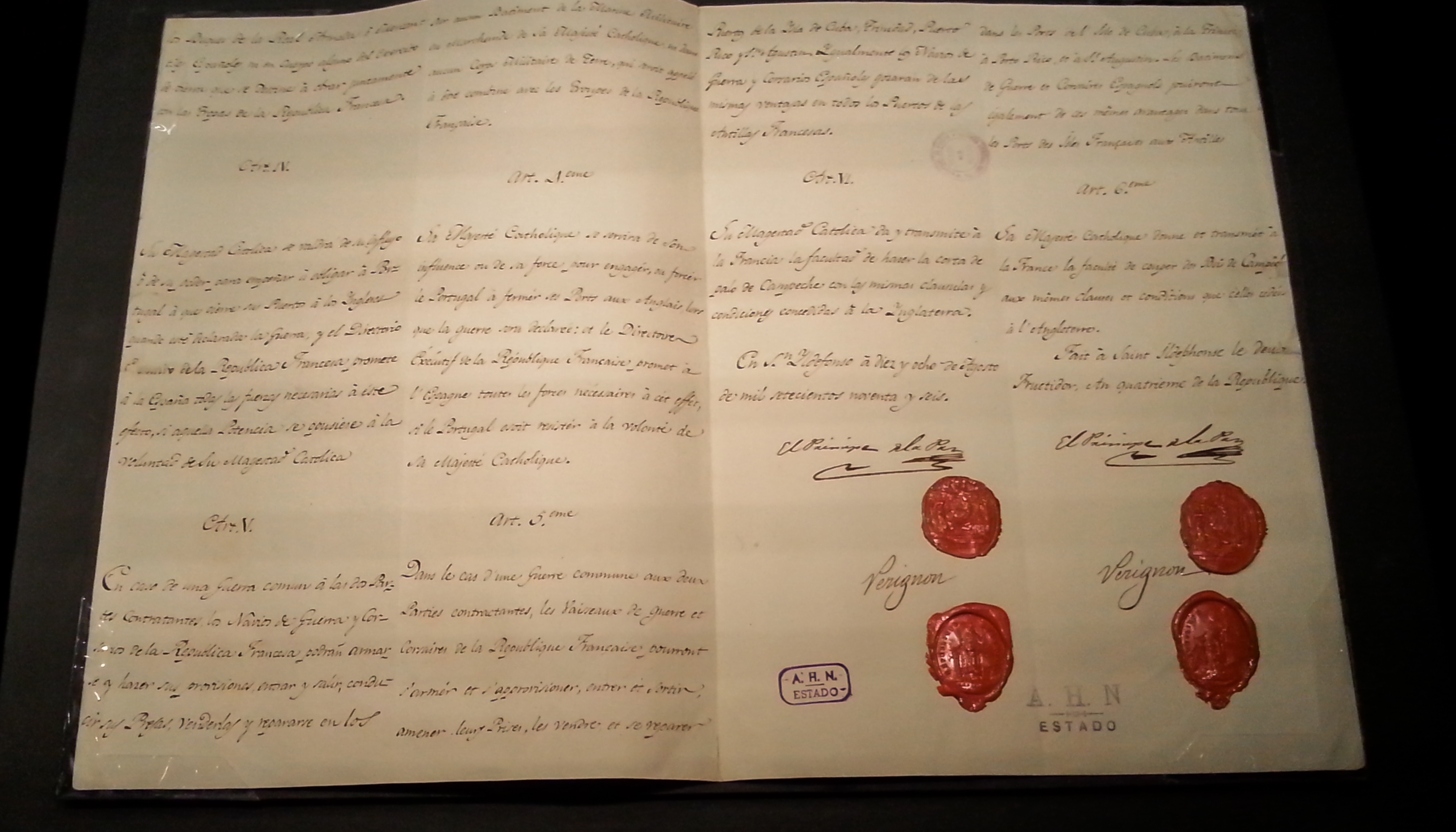
The Second Treaty of San Ildefonso in Archaeological Museum of Alicante

The Second Treaty of San Ildefonso was signed on 19 August 1796 between the Spanish Empire and the French First Republic. Based on the terms of the agreement, France and Spain would become allies and combine their forces against the Kingdom of Great Britain.

== Background ==
The Peace of Basel was signed on 22 July 1795. It ended the War of the Pyrenees from 1793 to 1795. France and Spain decided to join forces against their common enemy, the Kingdom of Great Britain.

== Contents ==
Manuel Godoy, acting on behalf of Charles IV of Spain, and General Catherine-Dominique de Pérignon, an envoy of the French Directory, finalized the treaty on 18 August 1796, at the Royal Palace of La Granja de San Ildefonso.

The treaty was signed on 19 August 1796. The main points agreed upon were as follows:

- An offensive and defensive military alliance would be established between the two countries.
- Upon the request of either signatory, the other would provide assistance within three months with a fleet comprising fifteen ships of the line, six frigates, and four corvettes, all duly armed and provisioned. This naval force would be supplemented by ground troops consisting of 18,000 infantry soldiers, 6,000 cavalry troops, and a proportionate amount of artillery.
- The cost of maintaining these forces would be borne by the country to which they belonged.
- In the event of a war undertaken by mutual agreement, both powers would combine all their military forces and act according to a joint policy.

== See also ==
- List of treaties
- First Treaty of San Ildefonso
- Third Treaty of San Ildefonso
