= Monastery of Santa Maria del Roure =

Ruined monastery in Spain

Coordinates: 42.324263°N 2.911191°E

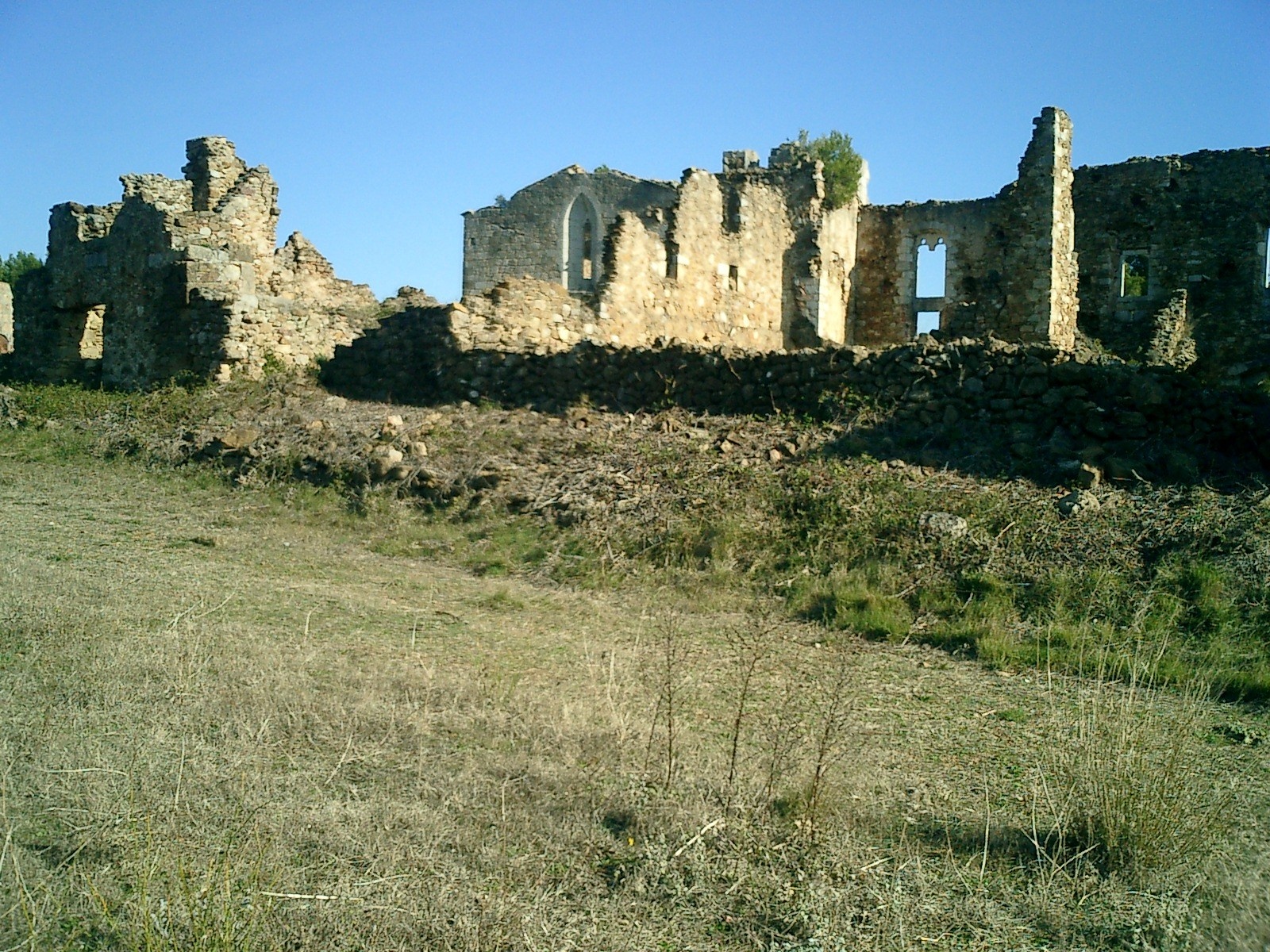
Monastery of Santa María del Roure

The monastery of Santa Maria del Roure, referred to as El Roure by locals, is a ruined monastery to the northwest of Pont de Molins (Alt Empordà, Catalonia) at the top of the Serra dels Tramonts. Mostly Gothic-era portions of the building are preserved. Dedicated to the Virgin Mary, the various names of the sanctuary -Santa Maria del Roure, Canònica de Santa Maria del Roure, Monastery of Santa Maria del Roure, or according to the Cartographic Institute of Catalonia: Mare de Déu del Roure- date from the 11th or early 12th century. This building is indexed in the Catalan heritage register as Bé Cultural d'Interès Local (BCIL) under the reference IPA-19985.

== Bibliography ==
- Del Campo and Jordan Ferran (2000). Set segles d'una família empordanesa, els Jordà de Molins. Figueras BRAU editions. ISBN 84-88589-70-0 (in Catalan).
- Vivas Llorens, Edward (1992). Guerra Gran, la batalla del Roure i el seu santuari pp. 109-148. Annals of the Institute of Empordanesos, 25. (in Catalan).
- Volume 3 (2005). El Meu País, tots els pobles, viles i ciutats de Catalunya. Barcelona, Editions 62. ISBN 9788429755701 (in Catalan).
