= Barthélemy Louis Joseph Schérer =

French general (1747–1804)

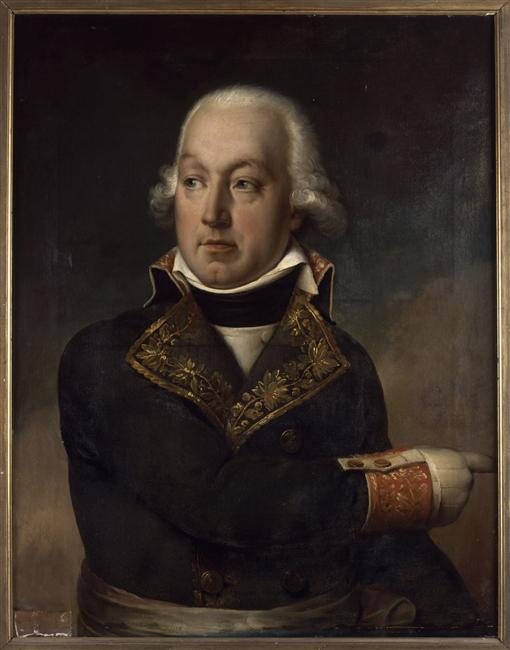
Portrait by Jean-Baptiste Paulin Guérin, 1836

Barthélemy Louis Joseph Schérer (18 December 1747 – 19 August 1804) was a French general during the French Revolutionary Wars.

In 1795 during the War of the First Coalition, Schérer was assigned to lead the Army of Italy. The army under his command was victorious during the Battle of Loano, but he was replaced by Napoleon Bonaparte in 1796.

== Early life and career ==
Schérer was born in Delle, near Belfort. Schérer served in the Austrian army long before the Revolution, but defected to France in 1775. In 1780 Schérer became a major in an artillery regiment stationed in Strasbourg. He entered Dutch service in 1785 as a major in the Légion de Maillebois. In 1790 he was released from Dutch service with the rank of lieutenant colonel.

== French Revolution ==
He returned to France in 1791 and in 1792 was made a captain in the 82nd Infantry Regiment, serving as aide-de-camp to General Jean de Prez de Crassier at the Battle of Valmy. In 1793 he served as a senior aide-de-camp to general Alexandre de Beauharnais on the Rhine. In 1794, Schérer was promoted to the rank of général de division and commanded a division in the Army of the Sambre and Meuse, serving with distinction at the Battle of Aldenhoven. On 3 May he married Marie Françoise Henriette Caroline Müller in a civil ceremony at Delle in the Franche-Comté. On 3 November 1794 he was named commander of the Army of Italy before his transfer to command the Army of the Eastern Pyrenees on 3 March 1795. On 14 June a 35,000-strong Spanish army defeated Schérer's 25,000 men in the Battle of Bàscara in Catalonia province in Spain.

On 31 August 1795 he was again sent to Italy to replace François Kellerman (the older) as commander-in-chief of the Army of Italy. As commander of the Army of Italy, Schérer won the Battle of Loano (22–24 November 1795) against an Austrian army – thanks in large part to the skills of his subordinate André Masséna – but failed to exploit his advantage due to his own caution and winter weather. He resigned his command in February 1796 and was replaced by Napoleon Bonaparte, who would go on to establish the First French Empire. Schérer was then unemployed for a number of months until being named Inspector-General of Cavalry, first of the Army of the Interior and then of the Army of the Rhine and the Moselle.

== War of the Second Coalition ==
Schérer served as French Minister of War from 22 July 1797 to 21 February 1799. When the War of the Second Coalition broke out, Schérer was given command of the Army of Italy once again. He won an initial clash at Pastrengo on 26 March. But he proved unable to stop the Russo-Austrian advance. He was defeated by Austrian General Pál Kray at the Battle of Magnano on 5 April. "Schérer went into this battle without forming a reserve and was thus unable to react to crisis or opportunities effectively." Forced to retire behind the river Mincio, he then loses the important fortress of Brescia on 21 April; he gave up command to Jean Moreau, prior to being defeated by the new coalition commander, Suvorov, in the Lecco engagement on 26 April, which preceded the Battle of Cassano on 27–28 April. Because of Schérer's responsibility for the loss of Italian possessions, he was forced to appear before a committee of inquiry. After securing an acquittal, he retired to private life on his estate at Chauny in Picardy, where he died in 1804.

== Footnotes ==
Political offices
Preceded by Lazare Hoche	Minister of War; 22 July 1797 – 21 February 1799	Succeeded by Louis Marie de Milet de Mureau
