= Bàscara =

- Municipality
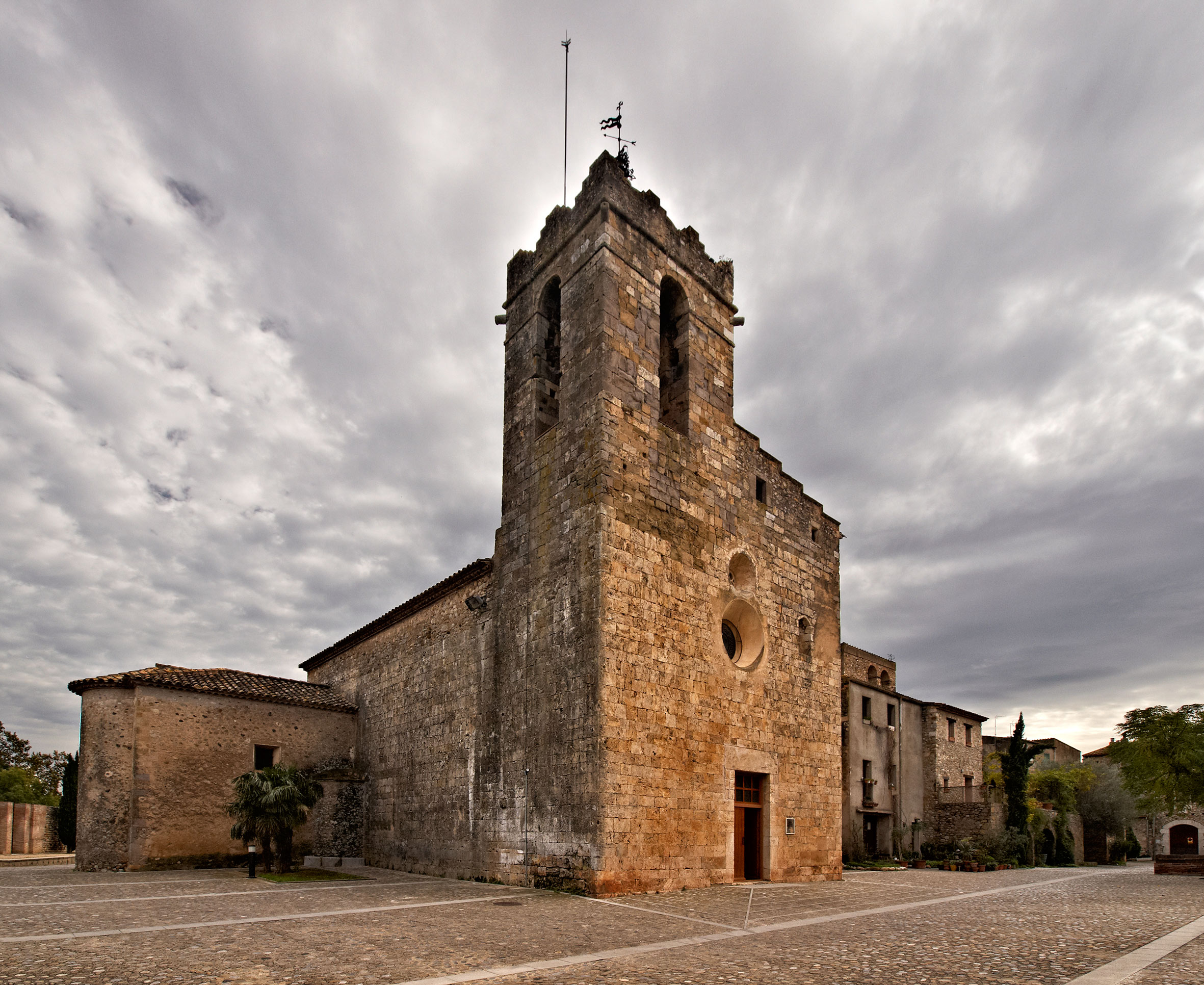
- Church of saints Iscle and Victoria, in Bàscara

- Flag Coat of arms

- Location in Catalonia Bàscara (Spain)
- Coordinates: 42.162°N 2.911°E
- Country: Spain
- Community: Catalonia
- Province: Girona
- Comarca: Alt Empordà

Government
  - Mayor: Narcís Saurina Clavaguera (2015)

Area
  - Total: 17.5 km^{2} (6.8 sq mi)

Population (2025-01-01)
  - Total: 1,049
  - Density: 59.9/km^{2} (155/sq mi)
- Website: www.bascara.cat

Bàscara (Catalan pronunciation: [ˈbaskəɾə]) is a small town and municipality in the comarca of Alt Empordà, Girona, Catalonia, Spain.
