= Catherine-Dominique de Pérignon =

French Marshal

Marshal of the Empire Catherine-Dominique de Pérignon Marquis de Pérignon
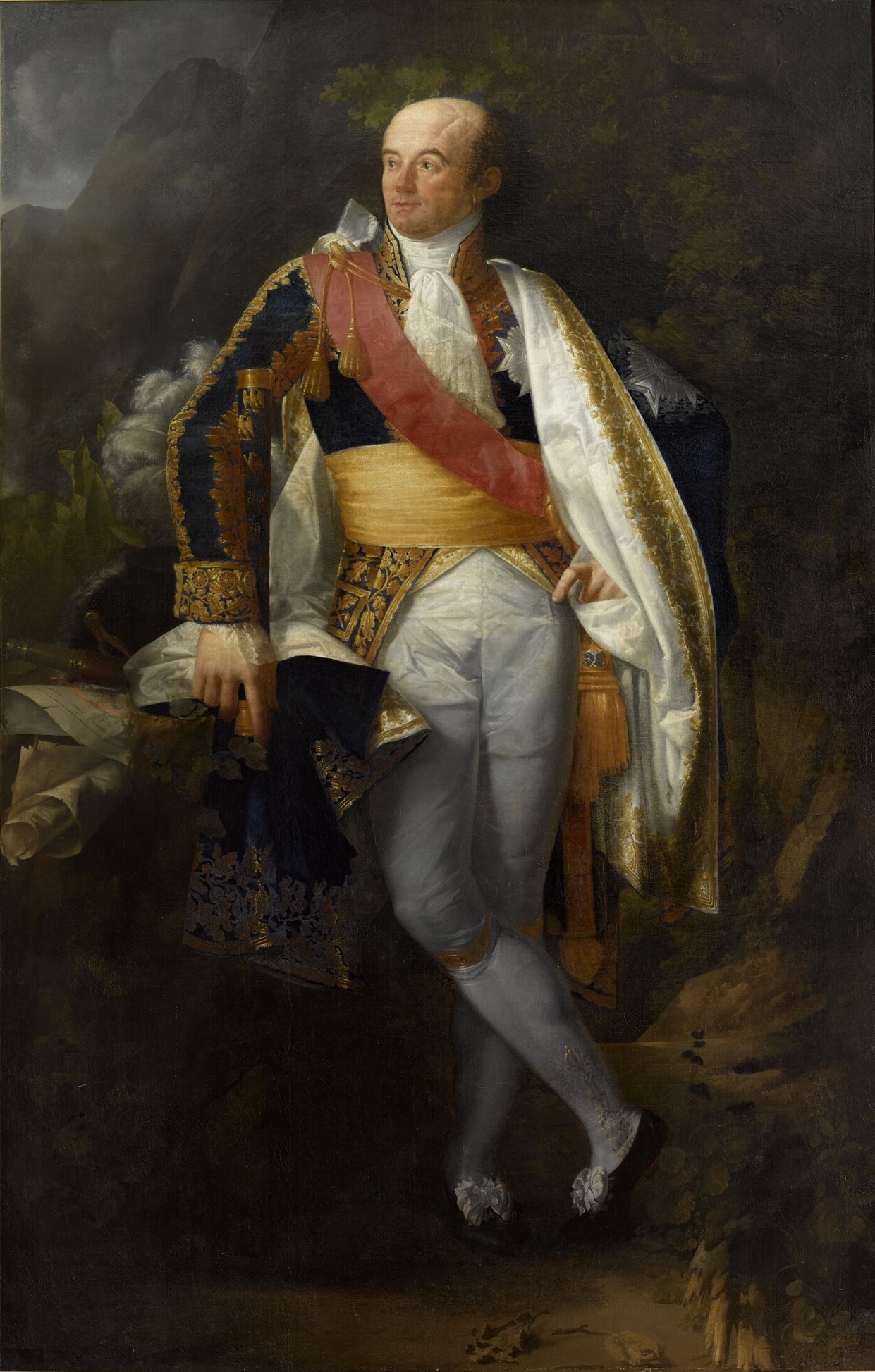
- Portrait by Philippe-Auguste Hennequin
- Born: 31 May 1754; Grenade-sur-Garonne, Kingdom of France
- Died: 25 December 1818 (aged 64); Paris, Kingdom of France
- Military career
- Allegiance: France
- Branch: Army
- Service years: 1769–1818
- Rank: Marshal of the Empire
- Commands: Armée des Pyrénées orientales
- Conflicts: French Revolutionary Wars; • Battle of the Black Mountain; • Siege of Roses; • Battle of Novi (POW); Napoleonic Wars
- Awards: Grand Cross of the Legion of Honour; Order of Saint Louis

Catherine-Dominique de Pérignon, 1st Marquis de Pérignon (English: /ˈpɛrɪnjɒn/ PEH-rih-nyon, French: [katʁin dɔminik də peʁiɲɔ̃], 31 May 1754 in Grenade – 25 December 1818) was a French general during the French Revolutionary Wars, and was appointed Marshal of the Empire in 1804 by Napoleon Bonaparte.

== Early life ==
Pérignon was born to a family of the lesser nobility in Grenade-sur-Garonne, Languedoc. After a roturier appointment in the grenadier corps of the Aquitaine Regiment, he retired to his estate. Pérignon welcomed the French Revolution, and gained a seat in the Legislative Assembly (1791), where he sat on the Right, but soon resigned and made his military career during the French Revolutionary Wars.

== Revolutionary Wars ==
From 1793 to 1795, Pérignon held commands in the Army of the Eastern Pyrenees, defeating the Spanish troops at the battle of Escola with "a sombre kind of energy". He succeeded Jacques François Dugommier as army commander after that general's death at the Battle of the Black Mountain. He successfully concluded the Siege of Roses in early 1795. In 1796, he was elected by Haute-Garonne to the Council of Five Hundred. He became the French Directory's ambassador to Spain, concluding the Treaty of San Ildefonso against the Kingdom of Great Britain.

Pérignon subsequently became involved in a smuggling affair and was compromised by a young woman who was a Royalist spy. In 1798 he was recalled and remanded to the Army in Liguria where he was assigned to command the left wing. Wounded and captured by Second Coalition armies at the Battle of Novi, he returned to France in 1800.

== Empire and Restoration ==
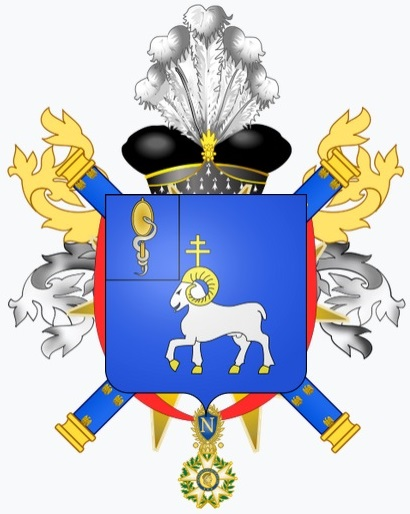
Heraldic achievement of Catherine-Dominique de Pérignon as comte d’Empire

Pérignon was a supporter of Napoleon Bonaparte, and was made a senator (1801), Marshal (1804) and count of the French Empire; in 1805, he received the Legion of Honor. From September 18, 1806, to July 23, 1808, he was the Governor-general of the Duchy of Parma. Later moved to the Kingdom of Naples, Pérignon, recently ennobled, became a close acquaintance of the royal couple (King Joachim Murat and Queen Caroline Bonaparte).

He returned to France in 1814 and rallied to the Bourbon Restoration and Louis XVIII - he was stricken off the list of Marshals during the Hundred Days, and voted in favor of the death penalty for Michel Ney. He was raised to marquis de Pérignon, a Peer of France, and awarded the Order of Saint Louis. As Dr. George Ostermann commented, "M. de Perignon died as if the Empire he served well, though reluctantly, had never existed."
