= War of the Pyrenees =

1793–95 French Revolutionary war against Spain and Portugal

- Part of the War of the First Coalition
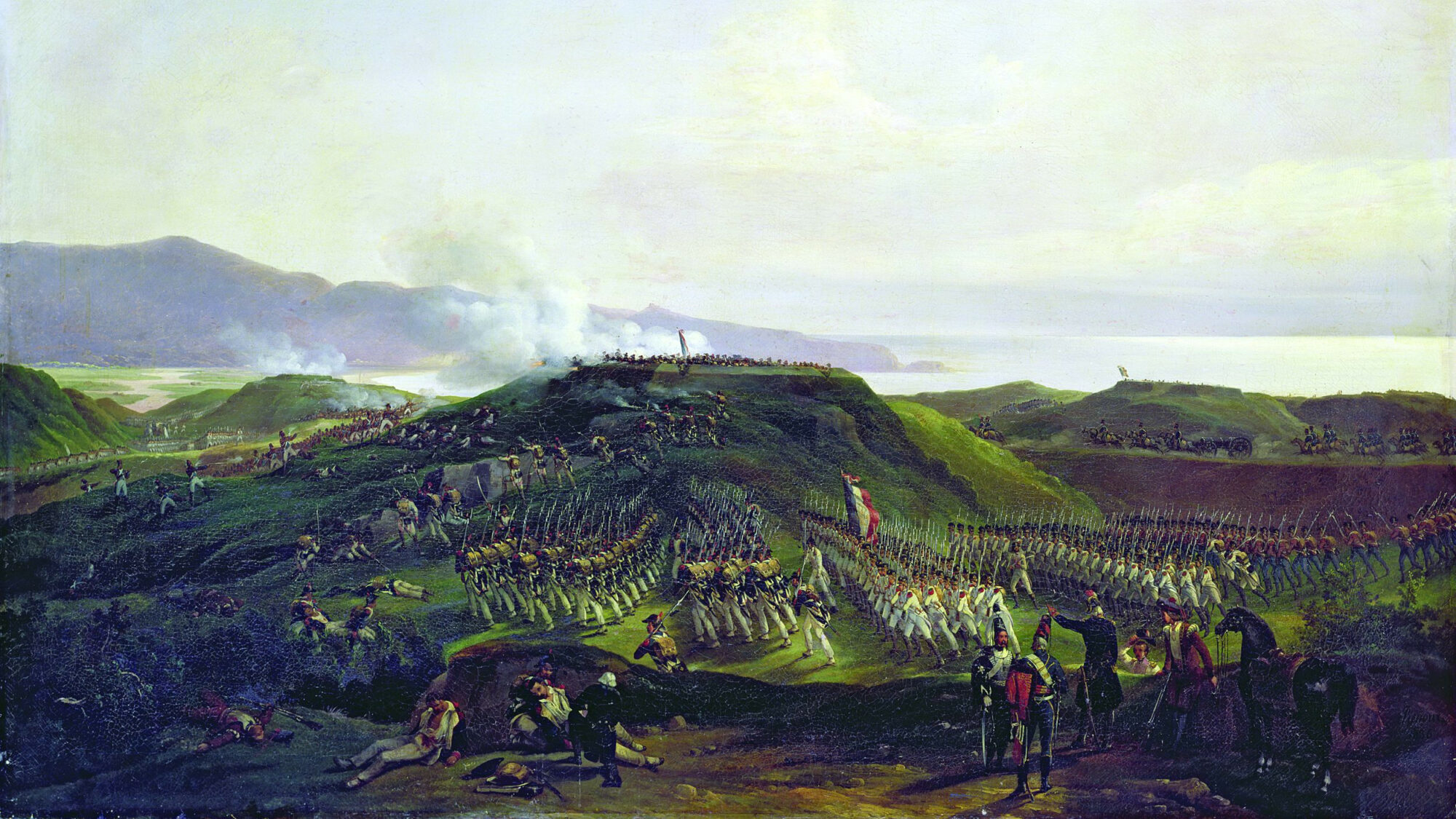
- French troops at Mont Calvaire on 23 June 1794
Date	7 March 1793 – 22 July 1795 (2 years, 4 months, 2 weeks and 1 day)
Location	Pyrenees
Result	French victory: Peace of Basel
Territorial changes	Spain cedes Santo Domingo to France

Belligerents
(French First Republic) French Republic	Spain; Portugal; Armée des Émigrés

Commanders and leaders
(French First Republic) Louis de Flers (French First Republic) Eustache d'Aoust (French First Republic) Luc Dagobert (French First Republic) Louis Marie Turreau (French First Republic) J. Dugommier † (French First Republic) Dominique Pérignon (French First Republic) Barthélemy Schérer (French First Republic) Bon-Adrien Moncey (French First Republic) Pierre Augereau (French First Republic) Pierre Sauret (French First Republic) Claude Victor-Perrin (French First Republic) Henri Delaborde	(Spain) Antonio Ricardos (Spain) Luis de la Union † (Spain) Jerónimo Girón (Spain) José de Urrutia (Spain) Gregorio Cuesta (Spain) Pedro Téllez-Girón (Spain) Juan de Lángara (Spain) Federico Gravina (Portugal) John Forbes (Portugal) Count of Feira (Portugal) Gomes Freire (Portugal) Count of Subserra; Duc of Ghent

Units involved
(French First Republic) Army of the Eastern Pyrenees (French First Republic) Army of the Western Pyrenees	Army of Catalonia (Portugal) Army of Assistance to the Crown of Spain

Strength
(French First Republic) Unknown	(Spain) (Portugal) 5,052 men

The War of the Pyrenees, also known as War of Roussillon or War of the Convention, was the Pyrenean front of the First Coalition's war against the French First Republic. It pitted Revolutionary France against the kingdoms of Spain and Portugal from March 1793 to July 1795 during the French Revolutionary Wars.

The war was fought in the eastern and western Pyrenees, at the French port of Toulon, and at sea. In 1793, a Spanish army invaded Roussillon in the eastern Pyrenees and maintained itself on French soil through April 1794. The French Revolutionary Army drove the Spanish Army back into Catalonia and inflicted a serious defeat in November 1794. After February 1795, the war in the eastern Pyrenees became a stalemate. In the western Pyrenees, the French began to win in 1794. By 1795, the French army controlled a portion of northeast Spain.

The war was brutal in at least two ways. The Committee of Public Safety decreed that all French royalist prisoners be executed. Also, French generals who lost battles or otherwise displeased the representatives-on-mission often faced prison or execution. Commanders of the Army of the Eastern Pyrenees were especially unlucky in this regard.

== Outbreak ==
On 21 January 1793, the National Convention of France executed Louis XVI by guillotine, enraging the other monarchs of Europe. France was already at war with the Habsburg monarchy, the Kingdom of Prussia and the Kingdom of Sardinia. After winning the Battle of Jemappes, the French army occupied the Austrian Netherlands. Emboldened, the French government decreed annexation of the territory (modern Belgium), provoking a diplomatic break with Great Britain. On 1 February, France declared war on Britain and the Dutch Republic. On 7 March, France declared war on its former ally, Spain.

=== Toulon ===
Spanish forces took part in the Siege of Toulon, which lasted from 18 September to 18 December 1793. The French were led by Jacques François Dugommier, and the Anglo-Spanish defenders were commanded by admirals Juan de Lángara, Federico Gravina, Samuel Hood and General Charles O'Hara. The Allies abandoned the port after a young officer of artillery, Napoleon Bonaparte, brought the fleet's anchorage under cannon fire. The French navy lost 14 ships of the line burned and 15 more captured. French casualties numbered 2,000, and Allied losses were twice as great. Afterward, the victors massacred up to 2,000 French royalists, who had been taken prisoner.

== Naval action ==
The Action of 14 February 1795 in the Gulf of Roses was a defeat for the French navy.

== Eastern Pyrenees ==
At the outbreak of war, King Charles IV of Spain appointed Captain General Antonio Ricardos to command the Army of Catalonia in the eastern Pyrenees. Ricardos invaded the Cerdagne and captured Saint-Laurent-de-Cerdans on 17 April 1793. Three days later, he routed a French force at Céret on the Tech. In despair, the elderly French commander in charge of Roussillon, Mathieu Henri Marchant de La Houlière, committed suicide. On 30 April, the French government divided the Army of the Pyrenees into the Army of the Eastern Pyrenees and the Army of the Western Pyrenees.

In the Battle of Mas Deu on 19 May 1793, Ricardos defeated Louis-Charles de Flers, which allowed the Spanish to invest the Fort de Bellegarde on 23 May. The Siege of Bellegarde ended by the French garrison surrendering on 24 June. During the Battle of Perpignan on 17 July, de Flers turned back the Spanish though French losses were heavier. On 28 August, Luc Siméon Auguste Dagobert defeated a Spanish force under Manuel la Peña at Puigcerdà, in the Cerdagne.

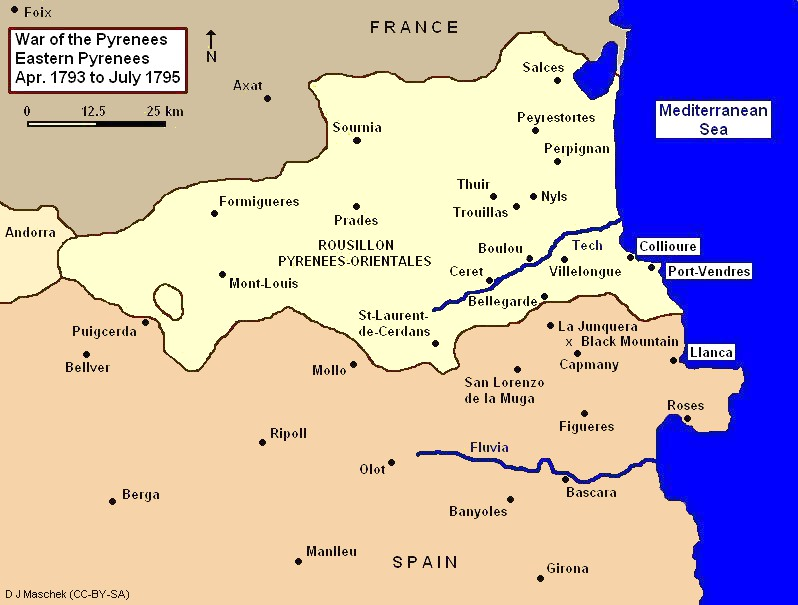
War of the Pyrenees, Eastern Theater.

In September, Ricardos sent two divisions under Jerónimo Girón-Moctezuma, Marquis de las Amarilas and Juan de Courten to cut off the fortress of Perpignan. However, Eustache Charles d'Aoust rallied the French to win the Battle of Peyrestortes, on 17 September. That represented the farthest Spanish advance in Roussillon. Five days later, Ricardos defeated Dagobert at the Battle of Truillas before he fell back to the Tech Valley. Ricardos repulsed d'Aoust at Le Boulou, on 3 October. The Battle of the Tech (Pla del Rei) on 13–15 October saw the Spanish repel the assaults of Louis Marie Turreau. A 5,000-man Portuguese division led by John Forbes joined Ricardos in time to defeat d'Aoust at the Battle of Villelongue-dels-Monts, on 7 December. At the Battle of Collioure, Gregorio García de la Cuesta captured the ports of Collioure and Port-Vendres from the French, on 20 December.

Ricardos died on 6 March 1794, and Spanish success died with him. Captain General Alejandro O'Reilly died ten days after the man whom he was to have succeeded, and Luis Firmin de Carvajal, Conde de la Union was appointed to command the Army of Catalonia instead. The Army of the Eastern Pyrenees also had a new commander, Jacques François Dugommier. At the Battle of Boulou, from 29 April to 1 May, Dugommier drove de la Union's army south of the border and forced the Spanish to abandon all their artillery and trains. Collioure fell to the French in late May and Eugenio Navarro's 7,000-man Spanish garrison became prisoners. The French royalist defenders fled in fishing boats before the surrender to avoid execution. Dugommier imposed a blockade on Bellegarde starting on 5 May. The inconclusive Battle of La Junquera was fought on 7 June. At the Battle of San-Lorenzo de la Muga (Sant Llorenç de la Muga) on 13 August, Pierre Augereau repulsed a Spanish attempt to relieve Bellegarde. The fortress fell on 17 September after the Spanish garrison had been starved out. From 17 to 20 November, the climactic Battle of the Black Mountain saw both Dugommier and de la Union killed in action. Dominique-Catherine de Pérignon took command of the French and led them to victory. Figueres and its Sant Ferran Fortress quickly fell to the French with 9,000 prisoners.

Pierre François Sauret successfully concluded the Siege of Roses, on 4 February 1795. Pérignon was replaced in army command by Barthélemy Louis Joseph Schérer. On 14 June 1795, Schérer was defeated near the Fluvià River by José de Urrutia y de las Casas at the Battle of Bascara. After peace was signed but before word had reached the fighting front, Cuesta recaptured Puigcerdà and Bellver de Cerdanya from the French on 26 and 27 July.

== Western Pyrenees ==
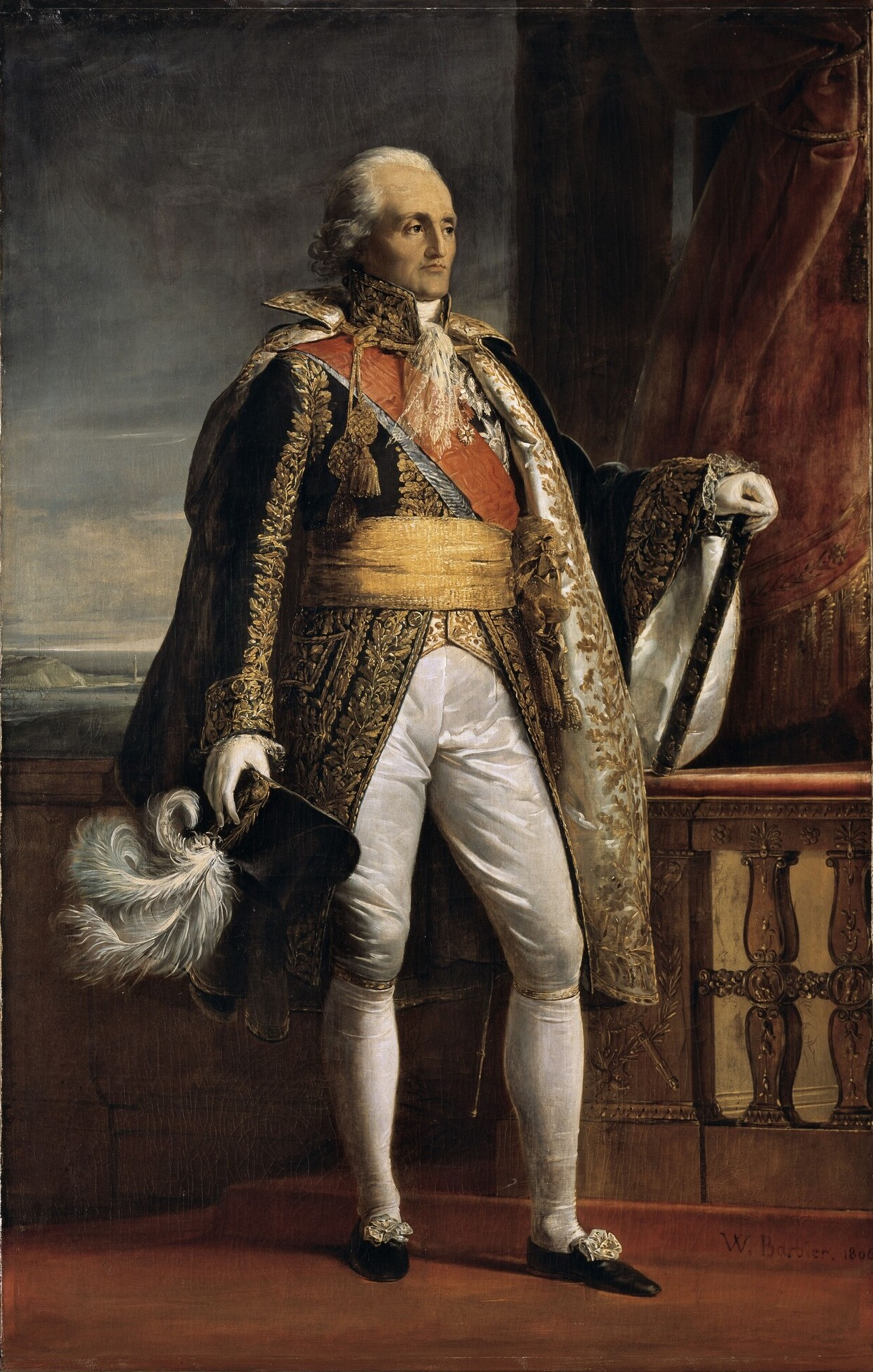
Bon-Adrien de Moncey

A number of minor clashes occurred in 1793, including actions fought by Bon-Adrien Jeannot de Moncey's 5th Light Demi-Brigade at Chateau-Pignon on 6 June, Aldudes in June, and Saint-Jean-de-Luz on 23 July.

On 5 February 1794, at the Battle of Sans Culottes Camp, the French successfully defended a fortified hilltop position near Hendaye against 13,000 Spanish infantry and 700 cavalry and artillery led by José Urrutia y de las Casas. Spanish casualties numbered 335, and French losses were 235. On 3 June, a 2,300-man French brigade commanded by Lavictoire stormed the Casa Fuerte position at Izpegi Pass (Col d'Ispeguy) 13.5 km west of Saint-Jean-Pied-de-Port. The 1,000 defenders, including a battalion of the Spanish Zamora Infantry Regiment, three companies of the Aldudes Rifles, and the French émigré Légion Royal battalion, lost 94 killed and wounded, and 307 were captured. The losses of the French brigade, which were part of Mauco's division, were described as "light". The same day, Jacques Lefranc's 2,000 French Republican troops seized the Izpegi Ridge.

On 3 March 1794, the bordering villages of Sara, Itxassou, Ascain and another nine Basque villages were declared ignoble by the republican authorities after 74 young residents, instead of watching the border for the French army, had fled south to the Spanish Basque region. All of the villages' inhabitants were held accountable for the flight, and draconian measures were imposed on them. All inhabitants of the villages 3 to 88 were crammed in carts like criminals and carried off to the Landes of Gascony. Men and women were segregated, and their valuable possessions seized or burnt. The victims of the massive deportation may amount to several thousand, and in five months, some 1,600 had died, 600 being from Sara. In a few years, many survivors would manage to return home.

On 23 June, Captain General Ventura Caro with 8,000 infantry and 500 cavalry and artillery tried unsuccessfully to oust a French force from a fortified position atop Mont Calvaire. The Spanish suffered 500 killed and wounded, as well as 34 captured. The French admitted 30 killed and 200 wounded. On 10 July, Antoine Digonet with a brigade of 4,000 troops overwhelmed the Zamora Infantry and the Légion Royal defending Mount Argintzu (Mont Arquinzu), at 43°3′23″N 1°29′40″W, 10 km south of Elizondo. Spanish losses numbered 314, and the French royalist commander, Marquis de Saint-Simon, was badly wounded. The French Republicans executed 49 French royalist prisoners.

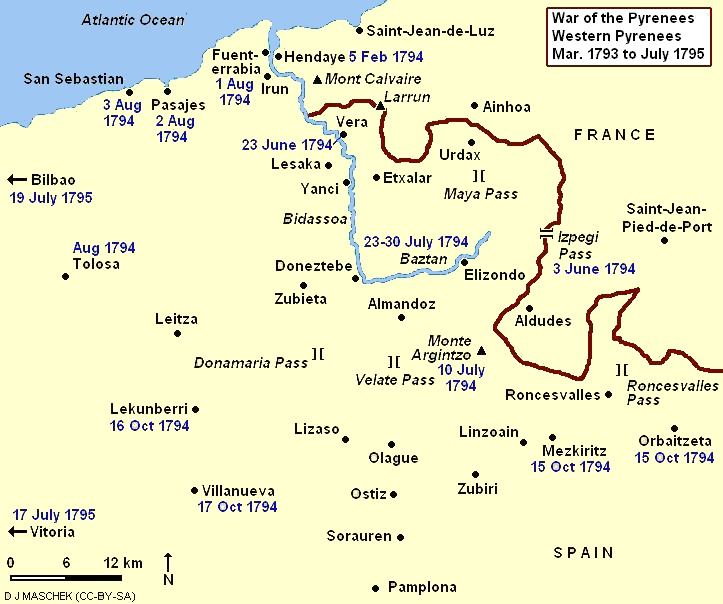
War of the Pyrenees, Western Theater

On 23 July, the Army of the Western Pyrenees attacked Spanish fortified positions with the divisions of Moncey, Henri François Delaborde, and Jean Henri Guy Nicolas de Frégeville. Jacques Léonard Muller commanded the army at the time, but Moncey exercised tactical control of operations during the Battle of the Baztan Valley. In the fighting near Elizondo and Doneztebe (Santesteban), Moncey overran the Spanish defenses. The French then followed the Bidasoa river northward in late July to seize the heights of San Marcial and the town of Hondarribia (Fuenterrabia), near the coast. In the latter operation, Moncey captured Don Vicente de los Reyes, 2,000 Spanish soldiers and 300 cannon on 1 August. Moncey followed the exploit by capturing San Sebastián without resistance on 3 August, with an additional 1,700 Spanish soldiers and 90 cannon falling into French hands. Soon afterward, the French also captured the town of Tolosa, and Moncey was soon promoted to army commander.

On 14 August 1794, the General Assembly of Gipuzkoa reunited in the coastal town of Getaria with the support of the San Sebastián bourgeoisie, followed by tense negotiations with senior officials of the French army. Besides embracing the French revolutionary ideas, the council made a formal petition: detachment from the Kingdom of Spain, respect for the region specific laws, allegiance of Gipuzkoa to France, free Catholic practice and a set of rules for the management of war-related circumstances. However, with negotiations leading to the Peace of Basel being in place, the French army's representatives of the National Convention, Jacques Pinet and Jean-Baptiste Cavaignac refused to accept the demands, and the Gipuzkoan representatives were imprisoned or exiled. Given the circumstances, another assembly was held in Mondragón on 13 September in which the attending regional representatives decided this time to support Ferdinand VII and mustered an autonomous provincial militia against the French army. However, on an unspecified date soon afterward, the more diplomatic Moncey restored the governing institutions of Gipuzkoa. The news of the declaration issued in Getaria by the Gipuzkoan representatives spread like fire to Madrid and sparked outrage in Spanish ruling circles and press, which lashed out at the Basque province and its inhabitants. Also, after the imprisonment in Bayonne, the Gipuzkoan representatives were persecuted by Spanish authorities and tried on high treason charges and unpatriotic behaviour.

From 15 to 17 October, Moncey, launched a broad front offensive from the Baztan Valley and the Roncevaux Pass to the south toward Pamplona. The Battle of Orbaitzeta saw clashes at Mezkiritz (Mezquiriz), Orbaitzeta, Lekunberri and Villanueva (Hiriberri). The 46,000-man French army drove back 13,000 Spanish troops under the command of Pedro Téllez-Girón, 9th Duke of Osuna, with 4,000 casualties and the loss of 50 cannon. French losses are unknown. The arms foundries at Orbaitzeta and Eugi, as well as the Spanish navy's mast store at Irati, fell to the French. However, the onset of winter weather and the outbreak of disease caused operations to be suspended for the year. A final clash occurred at Bergara on 7 November in which the French inflicted losses of 150 killed and 200 men and one cannon captured on a 4,000-man division led by Cayetano Pignatelli, 3rd Marquis of Rubí. The town was sacked, but a detachment of the territorial militia, led by Gabriel Mendizabal, who was to be promoted to general during the Peninsular War, managed to recapture it.

During the winter, Moncey reorganised his army, which had lost 3,000 men to disease. He finally secured a siege train and in June 1795, 12,000 reinforcements arrived from the Army of the West. Moncey's offensive began on 28 June and soon drove back Crespo's Spanish forces. Vitoria fell to the French on 17 July and Bilbao two days later. When news of the Peace of Basel arrived in early August, Moncey had crossed the Ebro and was preparing to invest Pamplona.

== Conclusion ==
The Peace of Basel ended the war on 22 July 1795, with Moncey close on the gates of Pamplona, the Basques fearing abolition of their self-government and Spanish Prime Minister Manuel Godoy panicking at the prospect of the still-autonomous Basque region switching allegiances to France and detaching from Spain. In the peace, Spain gave up the eastern two-thirds of the island of Hispaniola in exchange for keeping Gipuzkoa. Additionally, at the behest of Moncey and the Committee of Public Safety (Jean-Lambert Tallien), an annex was added to the treaty by which the Spanish Basques and specifically the Gipuzkoans, who had shown sympathies for the French, were given guarantees of receiving no reprisals from Spanish authorities, which was agreed. Notwithstanding that provision, at least the city council of San Sebastián was arrested and put to a court-martial trial in Pamplona that was held as of February 1796.

Under the Second Treaty of San Ildefonso on 19 August 1796, an alliance was established between France and Spain. However, peace was not concluded with the Portuguese, who remained part of the anti-French coalition.

== Sources ==
- Chandler, David, ed. Napoleon's Marshals. New York: Macmillan, 1987. ISBN 0-02-905930-5
  - Beckett, Ian F. W. "Moncey: An Honest Man".
  - Horward, Donald D. "Lannes: Roland of the Army".
  - Ostermann, Georges. "Pérignon: The Unknown Marshal".
- Durant, Will and Durant, Ariel. The Age of Napoleon. New York: MJF Books, 1975. ISBN 1-56731-022-2
- Hamel, Michael C. "The Roussillon Campaign of 1793–94: Spain’s Lost Opportunity." Age of Revolutions (2024). https://ageofrevolutions.com/2024/05/13/the-roussillon-campaign-of-1793-94-spains-lost-opportunity/.
- Smith, Digby. The Napoleonic Wars Data Book. London: Greenhill, 1998. ISBN 1-85367-276-9
- Diario de las operaciones del ejército español que entró en Francia por el Rosellón, Biblioteca Nacional de España, MSS/1276, 1001158748.
