= José de Urrutia y de las Casas =

Spanish captain general and military engineer

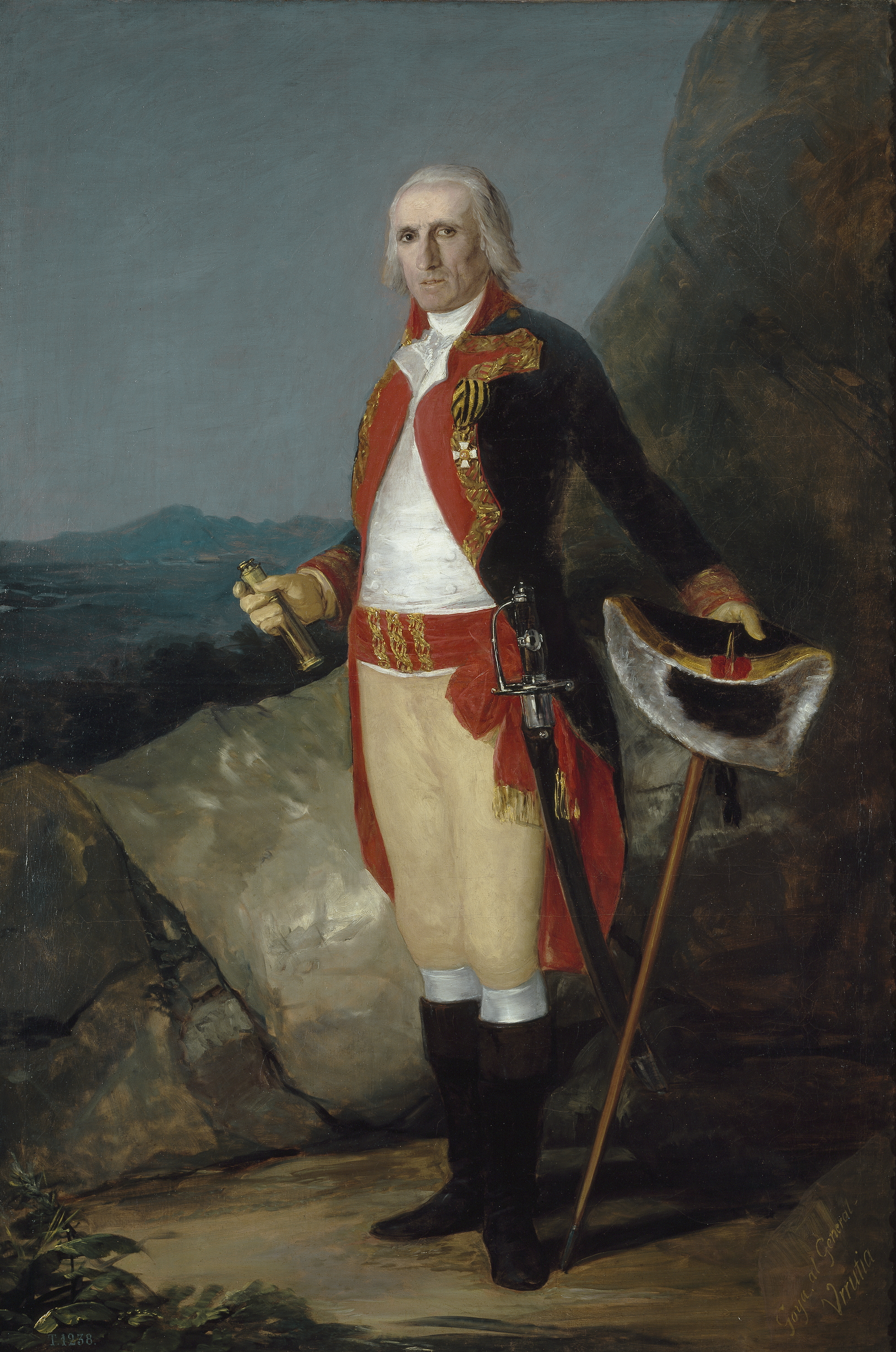
Portrait of General Urrutia (1798), by Francisco de Goya. Museo del Prado Unterschrift José de Urrutia y de las Casas

José Ramón de Urrutia y de las Casas (19 November 1739 – 1 March 1803) was a Spanish captain general and military engineer.

== Biography ==
He participated in the Great Siege of Gibraltar (1779 – 1783), the Russo-Turkish War, for which Catherine the Great awarded him the Cross of Saint George in 1789, and the War of the Pyrenees (1793–95).

In 1797, as engineer general, he proposed the unification of the four different sections of the Spanish army's military engineers under one command. His proposal led to the formation of the Regimiento Real de Zapadores-Minadores (1802), which in turn led to the formation of Spain's Royal Corps of Engineers (1803).

== Portrait ==
His portrait was painted by Goya in 1798, and is considered "one of the most penetrating psychological studies painted by Goya in his maturity".
