= André de La Barre =

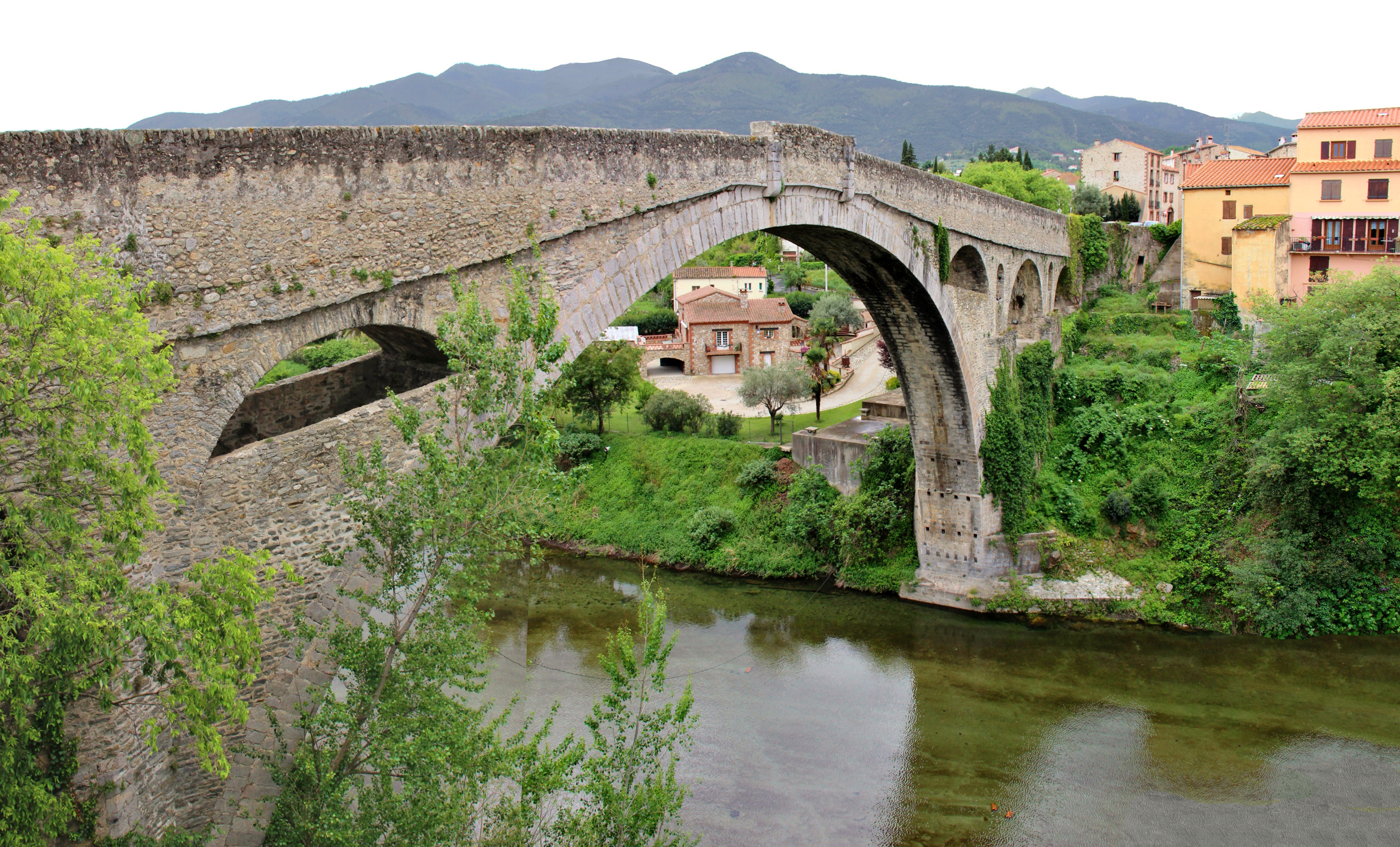
- La Barre's cavalry seized the Devil's Bridge (Pont du Diable) at Céret during the Battle of Boulou.
- Born: 30 November 1749 "Fort de Missouri", New France
- Died: 7 June 1794 (aged 44) Near Figueres, Spain
- Allegiance: Kingdom of France; France
- Branch: Cavalry
- Service years: 1759–1794
- Rank: General of Division
- Conflicts: American Revolutionary War; Siege of Savannah; War of the First Coalition; Siege of Toulon; Second Battle of Boulou; Battle of Collioure; Battle of La Junquera †
- Awards: Order of Saint Louis, 1780

André de La Barre (French pronunciation: [ɑ̃dʁe d(ə) la baʁ]; 30 November 1749 – 7 June 1794) was born in New France and joined France's colonial forces at a very young age. In 1764, he trained as an artillerist, but transferred to a cavalry unit as a volunteer three years later. In 1772 he officially joined the French Royal Army as a sous lieutenant of dragoons. In 1779, he was wounded at Savannah in the American Revolutionary War. By 1788, he was a staff officer with the rank of major. The start of the War of the First Coalition allowed officers chances for rapid advancement. Named a general of brigade in August 1793, La Barre fought at Toulon that year. Going to the Army of the Eastern Pyrenees, he distinguished himself at Boulou in May 1794. He was killed leading his cavalrymen in action at La Junquera on 7 June 1794.

== Early career ==
André de La Barre was born on 30 November 1749 in "le fort de Missouri (Etats-Unis)" in New France. (Note: The statement, "The fort of Missouri", is vague as to the actual location. The List of French forts in North America shows no forts in Missouri. Fort de Chartres (established 1720) across the Mississippi River from Missouri in the present-day state of Illinois is a possibility, but this is only speculation.) His parents were Augustin-Antoine de La Barre and Marie-Anne Adhémard de Lantaignac. On 1 June 1759 he joined a colonial militia unit. He attended an artillery school on 20 April 1764, after the Seven Years' War. On 1 April 1767, he joined the Carabinier Regiment as a volunteer. On 11 April 1770, he joined the Legion of Lorraine as a volunteer sous lieutenant and the appointment became official on 26 October 1772. La Barre was promoted to second lieutenant in the Condé Dragoon Regiment on 5 December 1776. He sailed with Admiral Charles Henri Hector, Count of Estaing during the American Revolutionary War and was wounded at the Siege of Savannah in autumn 1779. He was awarded the Order of Saint Louis on 20 January 1780 and returned to France. La Barre secured a discharge as captain in the Royal Cravattes Regiment on 4 July 1780. He passed into the Royal-Normandie Regiment on 20 January 1784. He was assigned as deputy to the army general staff on 1 June 1785. He was promoted major as an aide-de-camp on 1 July 1788.

== War of the First Coalition ==
After King Louis XVI's Flight to Varennes in June 1791, large numbers of noble officers began leaving the Royal Army. The empty positions needed to be filled by the remaining officers, or by promotions from the ranks. This allowed speedy promotions for soldiers with military experience. La Barre was appointed lieutenant colonel in the 15th Dragoon Regiment on 25 July 1791 and colonel of the regiment on 23 November 1791. First serving in the Army of Italy, he was provisionally named general of brigade on 25 June 1793. This promotion was confirmed on 22 August 1793.

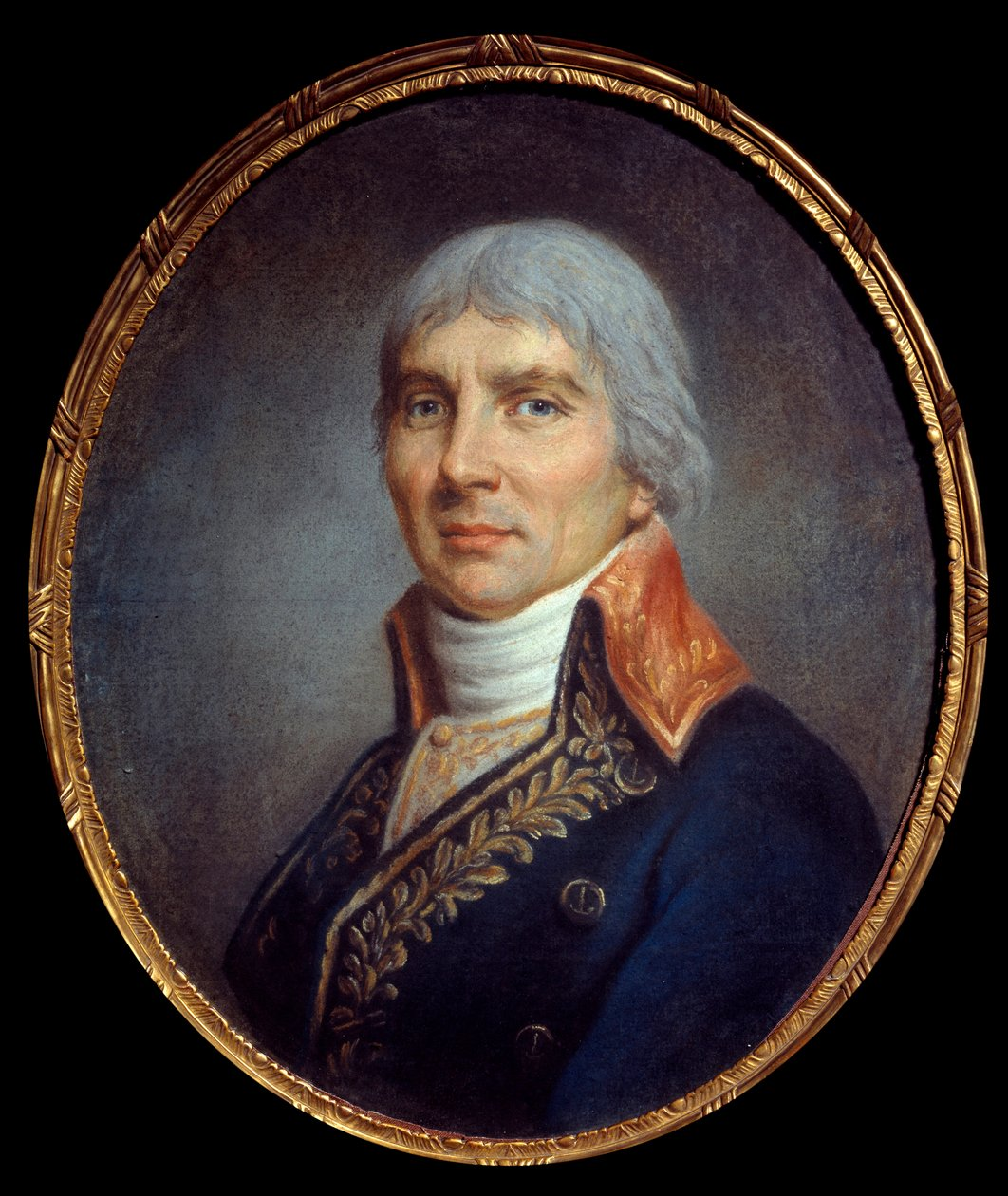
Jacques Dugommier

La Barre served at the Siege of Toulon in fall 1793. An order of battle by Digby Smith showed that two squadrons of the 15th Dragoons served at Toulon. At first, the French army besieging Toulon was divided into two independent divisions under Jean François Carteaux and Jean François Cornu de La Poype. Later, La Poype was placed under Carteaux's command, despite the fact that Carteaux was utterly devoid of military experience. This led to an intense rivalry between the two generals until 15 October 1793, when Carteaux sent La Poype to Lyon and replaced him in command of the East Division with La Barre. La Poype was brought back on 23 October, so La Barre's time in command was short. On 16 November, Jacques François Dugommier assumed command of the army besieging Toulon. On the night of 16–17 December, Dugommier ordered an assault on Fort Mulgrave which was defended by 5,000 Spanish and 700 British troops. The columns of La Barre and Claude Perrin Victor were supposed to attack separate faces of the fort, but in the confusion of a thunderstorm, the two forces collided outside the fort. They rushed to the attack, but their first charge was repelled. At length, the French captured the fort after 3,000 of its defenders had fallen in bitter fighting. French losses were heavy and included Victor wounded. The Coalition forces abandoned Toulon on 18 December 1793.

Dugommier took command of the Army of the Eastern Pyrenees and La Barre went with him. La Barre was promoted general of division on 5 January 1794. Historian Ramsay Weston Phipps described La Barre as, "An ex-noble, he had made himself popular, although maintaining discipline, and was a fine leader". Dugommier placed La Barre in command of the army's cavalry. The Spanish army in the Tech valley held Céret with its left wing and the entrenched Camp of Le Boulou with its center, but there was a gap between the center and the right wing on the coast at Collioure. Dugommier opened the Second Battle of Boulou by threatening the Spanish left, then threw the main weight of his attack into the gap. On the morning of 30 April 1794, French forces seized the heights in rear of the Spanish center. During the afternoon, the French captured the fortified position of Montesquieu.

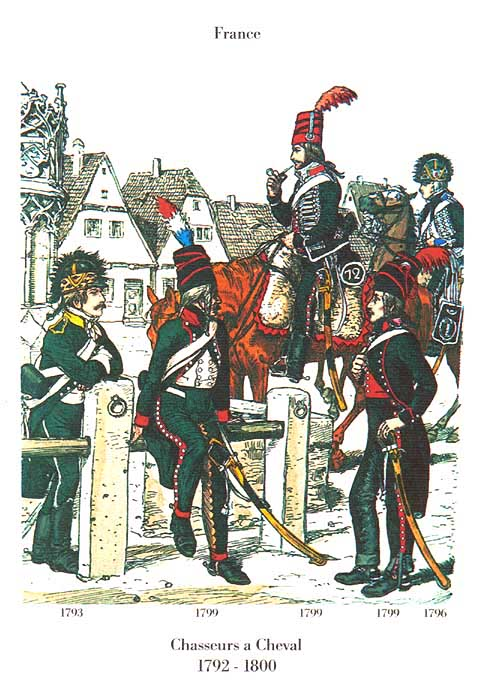
French Chasseurs à Cheval

On 1 May, La Barre assembled the bulk of the French cavalry near a position called Trompettes Basses. When he discerned the Spanish troops starting to withdraw to the west, he dashed after them. He sent François Jean Baptiste Quesnel with part of his cavalry to advance along the south bank of the Tech, while taking his best units, the 1st Hussars and the 22nd Chasseurs along the north bank. La Barre led the two regiments across to the south bank at the Saint-Jean ford and raced for the Céret bridge which his horsemen seized. The majority of the retreating Spanish got away, but only as a fleeing mob. The cavalry overran the Spanish artillery and wagon train, capturing 140 cannons, 800 mules, the baggage train, and 1,500 Spanish soldiers.

After Boulou, Dugommier carried out the Siege of Collioure using the divisions of La Barre and Pierre François Sauret. The place surrendered to the French on 26 May 1794. At the same time, the French also besieged the Fort de Bellegarde which held out until its Spanish garrison finally capitulated on 17 September. On 6 May, Charles-Pierre Augereau disregarded his orders and led his right wing division to occupy Sant Llorenç de la Muga where there was a Spanish cannon foundry. Occupied with the sieges of both Collioure and Bellegarde, Dugommier wanted his division commander to withdraw to a less exposed position, but Augereau obstinately refused. On 19 May 1794, 15,000 Spanish troops attacked Augereau's 6,000 men in the First Battle of Sant Lorenç de la Muga. The Spanish assault plan proved too complicated, and the French repelled the attack.

== Death ==
During 1793, the Army of the Eastern Pyrenees had been disrupted by the all-powerful representatives on mission to an extraordinary degree. When Dugommier assumed command, two new representatives were assigned to the army, Pierre-Amable de Soubrany and Édouard Jean Baptiste Milhaud. Dugommier enjoyed good relations with the two, and the new representatives were able to obtain better supplies for the army. Nevertheless, the two representatives used their authority to punish a large number of officers, both good and bad.

Dugommier was wounded at Collioure on 16 May. He recuperated at Narbonne and only returned to the army in early June. At La Jonquera, Dugommier ordered Catherine-Dominique de Pérignon, leading his center division, to mount a reconnaissance of the Spanish defenses and try to interfere with their construction. On the night of 6 June, Pérignon advanced on the Spanish positions, crossing to the west bank of the Llobregat River. The Spanish commander Luis Fermín de Carvajal, Conde de la Unión brought up a force of Spanish cavalry to attack Pérignon's flank. La Barre had an inferior force of French cavalry that might have delayed the Spanish attack. However, Soubrany was present and, overruling La Barre, he ordered the French cavalry to charge. The French horsemen were routed by the superior force of Spanish cavalry and La Barre was mortally wounded. Augereau attacked the Spanish camp at Llers, but both his and Pérignon's divisions were compelled to retreat. La Barre died on 7 June 1794.

== Notes ==
Footnotes

Citations
