= Siege of Collioure (1794) =

Siege of the War of the First Coalition

Coordinates: 42°31′36″N 03°04′53″E

- Part of the War of the Pyrenees
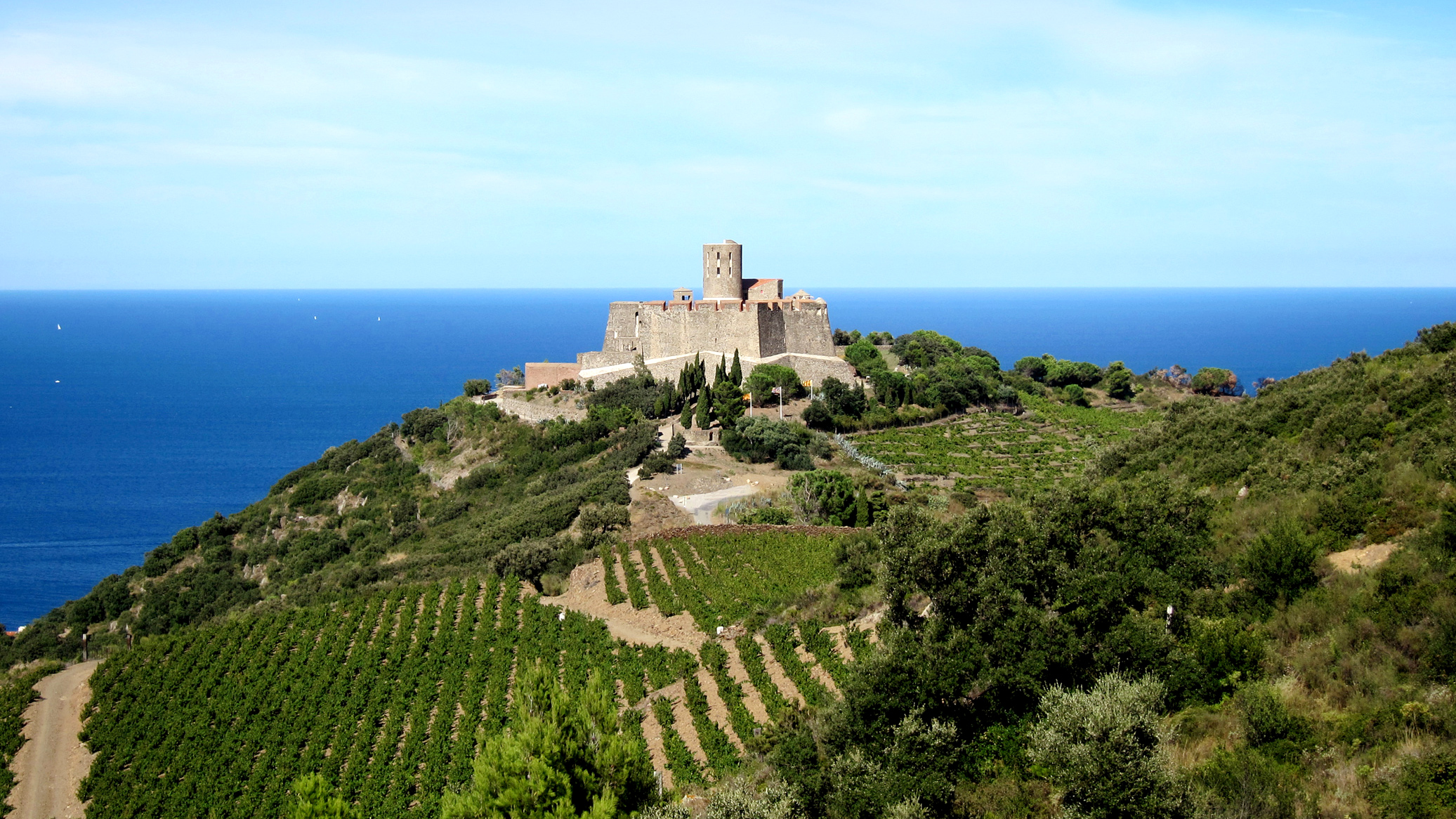
- Fort Saint-Elme overlooks the Mediterranean Sea
Date	6–29 May 1794
Location	Collioure, Pyrénées Orientales, France
Result	French victory

Belligerents
France	Spain

Commanders and leaders
(France) Jacques Dugommier (WIA) (France) Pierre Sauret	(Spain) Conde de la Unión (Spain) Eugenio Navarro

Units involved
Army of the Eastern Pyrenees	Army of Catalonia

Strength
14,000	7,000–8,000

Casualties and losses
150	160–1,000, 91 guns 22 colors

The siege of Collioure (6 – 29 May 1794) saw a Republican French army led by Jacques François Dugommier invest the French port of Collioure held by a Spanish garrison commanded by Eugenio Navarro. The actual siege work was carried out by Pierre François Sauret's reinforced division. After the three-and-a-half-week War of the Pyrenees siege, the Spanish fleet sent to evacuate the garrison was blown off station by a storm. Navarro surrendered the town on the promise to exchange the paroled garrison for an equal number of French prisoners. After the defenders were released, the Spanish army commander Luis Fermín de Carvajal, Conde de la Unión refused to authorize the agreement or return any French captives. The infuriated French government afterward passed a decree ordering death to all Spanish prisoners and some units carried out the brutal order.

== Background ==
On 16 January 1794 Jacques François Dugommier replaced Eustache Charles d'Aoust as commander-in-chief of the Army of the Eastern Pyrenees. Aoust was condemned and executed by guillotine on 2 July 1794. Dugommier had an advantage over previous commanders of the army because he came as the victor of the Siege of Toulon which ended on 19 December 1793. He was also a member of the National Convention and therefore part of the political establishment. Until Dugommier's accession, the Army of the Eastern Pyrenees had been under the control of arrogant representatives on mission who abused their authority to remarkable degree. This situation now changed.

Dugommier enjoyed good relations with the new representatives Édouard Jean Baptiste Milhaud and Pierre-Amable de Soubrany. At first the two removed a large number of army officers in an indiscriminate manner. Unlike the earlier representatives, they interfered less in military matters and devoted themselves to obtaining supplies for the army. For example, they managed to get forage for horses and mules delivered that was previously held up by the Army of the Alps officials at Lyon. Dugommier organized the best soldiers into battalions of light infantry, which were a success, and grenadiers, which were a failure. He also separated the better troops into combat units and the worst men into garrison units. Some soldiers had been using fowling pieces. Except for 5,000 or 6,000 muskets, the inefficient infantry weapons were all replaced with good firearms. Under Dugommier, the artillery, cavalry and hospitals all saw some improvement.

The Army of the Eastern Pyrenees received 10,500 troops from Toulon, up to 7,000 reinforcements from the Army of the Western Pyrenees and 6,000 men from training camps at Toulouse. Dugommier welded these into a field army of 28,000 trained soldiers and 5,000 recruits, placing 25,000 men in training camps or garrisons. Pierre Augereau's 6,300-man right wing division soon emerged as the best unit in the army due to frequent drilling. Catherine-Dominique de Pérignon commanded the 12,500-strong center, Pierre François Sauret the 5,000-man left wing, Claude Perrin Victor the 3,000-strong Reserve and André de La Barre the 2,000 cavalry troopers. An independent division operated in the Cerdagne farther inland, but its commander Luc Siméon Auguste Dagobert died on 21 May 1794 and was replaced by François Amédée Doppet.

Antonio Ricardos, the commander of the Spanish Army of Catalonia died on 13 March 1794, supposedly after drinking a poisoned drink intended for Manuel Godoy, the close adviser of King Charles IV. His successor Alejandro O'Reilly died ten days later and the king appointed Luis Firmín de Carvajal, Conde de la Unión to lead the army. The interim commander Jerónimo Girón-Moctezuma, Marquis de las Amarillas fortified Le Boulou in the Tech River valley. When La Unión arrived to take command at the end of April, he set up his headquarters at Céret.

Augereau lured La Unión into pushing 8,000 troops of his left wing forward, which suited Dugommier's strategy. There were 8,000 Spanish at Le Boulou in the center and 6,900 on the coast at Collioure. Between the Spanish center and right yawned a large gap. Dugommier ordered Sauret to watch the Spanish at Collioure while he hurled Pérignon powerful center division into the gap. The Battle of Boulou on 30 April–1 May was a French victory. The Spanish suffered 2,000 killed and wounded and 1,500 captured. Forcing their enemies to flee over the mountains to Spain, the French seized 150 cannons, 1,800 horses and mules and the entire Spanish baggage train while sustaining minimal casualties.

== Siege ==
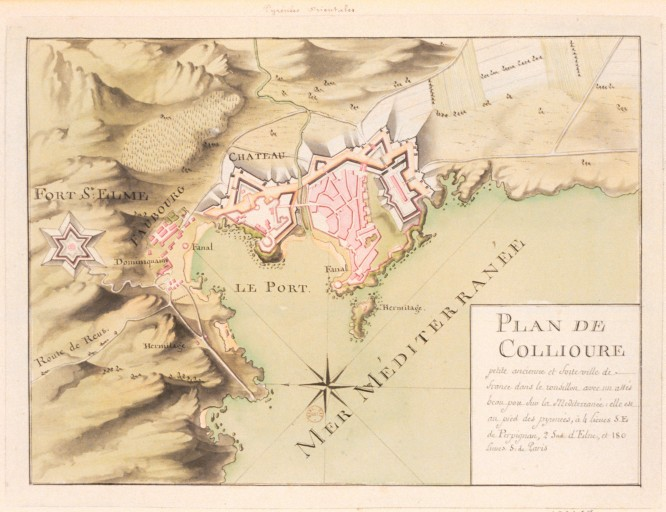
Collioure and Fort Saint-Elme in the 18th century

Though Dugommier paused for four days after his victory, its consequences came quickly. Without orders, Augereau moved forward to capture Sant Llorenç de la Muga (San Lorenzo de la Muga) on 6 May. At the same time Sauret and Victor invested Collioure while Pérignon blockaded the Fort de Bellegarde. There were too many sieges for the French to carry out. The Committee of Public Safety had ordered that the coastal towns be recaptured and Dugommier had ignored these instructions when he fought at Boulou. Now Dugommier determined to take Collioure. Its garrison under Eugenio Navarro numbered 7,000 men and 91 guns and included the French Royalist Légion de la Reine.

On 6 May, a 17-ship French squadron unloaded the siege equipment. That day Captain Jacques Castanié led his ships in a bombardment of the coastal forts. Dugommier employed the divisions of Sauret and La Barre, altogether 14,000 soldiers. Aside from the cavalry, there were five infantry brigades under Jean-Jacques Causse, Jean François Micas, Louis Pelletier, Jean Simon Pierre Pinon and Victor. The siege artillery consisted of 16 24-pound cannons, six 12-pound cannons, two 12-inch mortars and four 8-inch mortars. Nine 24-pound cannons opened fire on Fort Saint-Elme on 10 May. The fort is situated between Collioure and Port-Vendres and overlooks both ports.

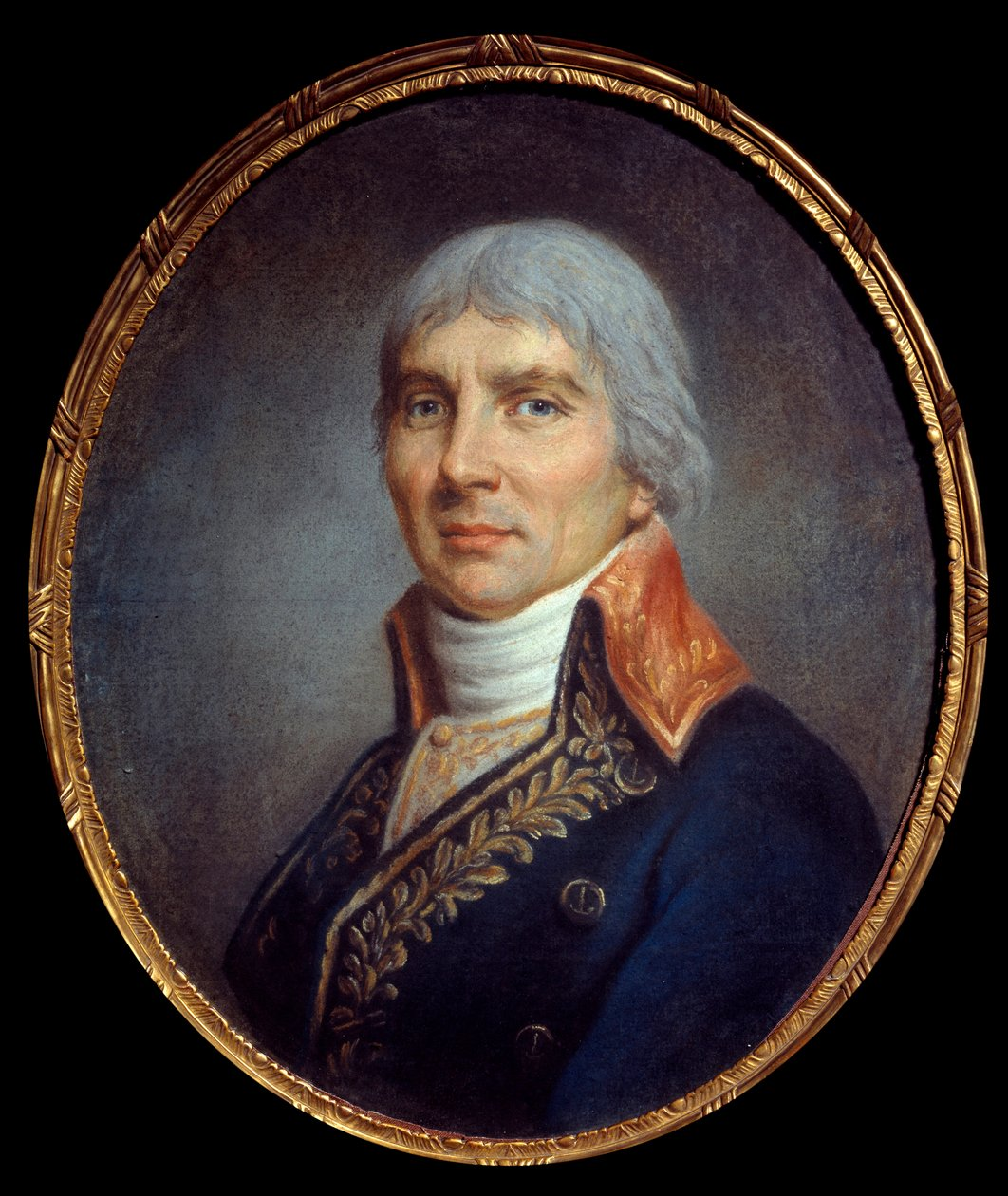
Jacques Dugommier

On the evening of 16 May, Navarro launched a sortie against the French siege lines in which Dugommier was wounded. The Spanish soldiers nearly caught the French army commander, but he was rescued by a body of grenadiers from the 28th Demi-brigade. The French finally pushed their adversaries back into the forts. On 23 May Dugommier ordered an attack on Fort Saint-Elme which failed due to poor coordination. The garrison asked for surrender terms, but the French conditions were too harsh, so the defenders slipped away to Collioure and Port-Vendres. The French siege guns quickly reduced Port-Vendres and its garrison retreated to Collioure. On 24 May Navarro received news that Admiral Federico Carlos Gravina y Nápoli was on his way with a fleet to evacuate his troops.

On 26 May, just as Gravina was about to drop anchor off Collioure, a storm drove his fleet away. Accordingly, Navarro capitulated to Dugommier on the pledge to allow his 7,000 troops to return to Spain in exchange for releasing the same number of French prisoners. The term stipulated that neither the French nor the Spanish prisoners were to fight against the other side for the remainder of the war. Navarro was supposed to deliver up the Royalist legion, but he instead sent them away in small craft. If the Royalists had fallen into the hands of the French they would have been shot. The French overlooked this difficulty but were infuriated by what followed.

After 7,000 Spanish troops were returned, La Unión refused to give up any French prisoners. He justified his decision by stating that the surrender was void without his consent and that Navarro had no authority to release French prisoners. He refused to abide by terms whereby his returned Spanish troops were not eligible to fight the French but that any returned French troops might be used against Spain's allies. He declared that Dugommier should be satisfied with possession of the coastal forts and their contents. When Dugommier furiously wrote to La Unión, asking him to reconsider, the Spanish army commander offered to submit the case to the United States of America for arbitration.

== Consequences ==
An enraged Dugommier wrote to the National Convention demanding that no Spanish prisoners be taken. Augereau also insisted that his soldiers wanted a "War to the Death". On 11 August 1794 the Convention passed a law that no more Spanish prisoners would be accepted. Augereau and his division carried out the policy of killing all Spanish soldiers that fell into their hands, while Dugommier was not as keen on explicitly following through on the decree. In the Battle of San Lorenzo de la Muga on 13 August, Augereau's men killed 80 officers and 1,256 soldiers while taking only 140 prisoners. On the other hand, when the 1,000-man Spanish garrison surrendered on 17 September after the Second Siege of Bellegarde, their lives were spared. The Army of the Western Pyrenees accepted the surrender of 2,000 Spanish soldiers at Fuentarrabía on 1 August and 1,700 more at San Sebastián the next day.

The Spanish did not retaliate against the French for carrying out their draconian law. Instead, La Unión wrote to Charles IV that it would be better to treat French prisoners with more kindness than before and the king affirmed the policy. The French admitted to only 150 casualties during the Siege of Collioure while the Spanish recorded 160 killed and wounded. The French captured 91 guns and 22 colors. One source stated that the Spanish garrison numbered 8,000 soldiers and that 7,000 surrendered.
