= Eugenio Navarro =

Spanish army officer (1733–1810)

- Born: 14 November 1733; Borja, Zaragoza
- Died: 13 February 1810 (aged 76) Borja, Zaragoza
- Conflicts: Spanish invasion of Portugal (1762); Siege of Almeida (1762); Great Siege of Gibraltar; War of the Pyrenees; Siege of Bellegarde (1793); Montesquieu (1793); Villelongue (1793); Banyuls-dels-Aspres (1793); Siege of Collioure (1794); War of the Oranges

Eugenio Martín Navarro de Egui (1733–1810) was a Spanish military commander.

== Early career ==
Enlisting as a cadet in the Royal Guard Regiment in 1749, he was promoted to alférez in 1754.

During the Spanish invasion of Portugal (1762), he saw action at the Siege of Almeida. He was promoted to lieutenant in 1766.

Given command of a company of Fusiliers in 1779, Navarro took part in the Great Siege of Gibraltar until it was lifted in 1783. He was promoted to Infantry brigadier in 1789, and Grenadier captain in 1791.

At the outbreak of the War of the Pyrenees Navarro was destined to the Army of Rosellón, where he was given command of the 3rd Brigade of Guards (Grenadiers and Chasseurs). Appointed governor of Fort de Bellegarde following its fall in June 1793, he distinguished himself in action at Montesquieu (14 October 1793), at Villelongue and Banyuls-dels-Aspres (7 and 14 December), where he was wounded. Having been promoted to field marshal that same month, Navarro was given command of the 6th Battalion of Guards.

Following the Conde de la Unión's retreat from Boulou, Navarro, finding himself besieged at Collioure with a garrison of around 8,000 since the beginning of May, capitulated towards the end of that month, surrendering 7,152 men, (Note: Navarro had previously allowed the men of the French Royalist Légion de la Reine regiment attached to his garrison to escape on small boats as they would surely have been executed by the besieging force. (Cust 1859, p. 237.)) 91 guns and 21 flags.

On his release, Navarro retired to Aragón. During the brief War of the Oranges (1801), he was destined to the Army of Extremadura.

At the outbreak of the Peninsular War (May 1808), Navarro was asked to take command of Zaragoza, which he refused due to his advanced years.
