= Le Faubourg de Collioure =

Painting by André Derain

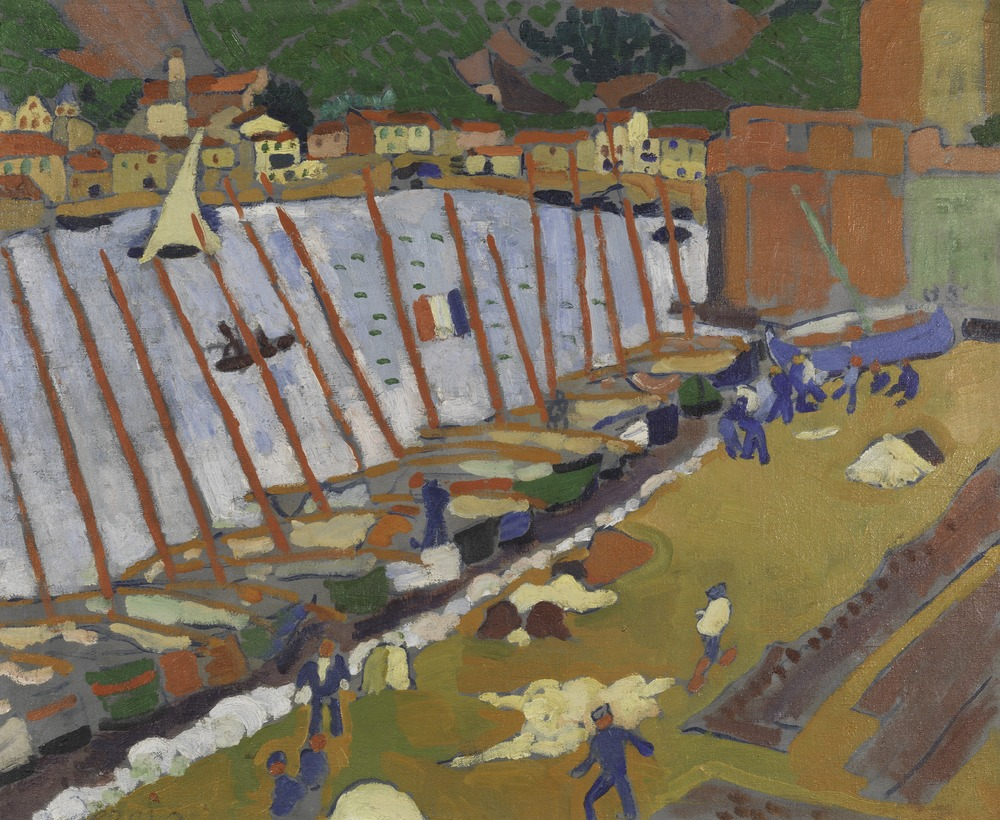
- Artist: André Derain
- Year: 1905
- Medium: oil on canvas
- Dimensions: 59.5 cm × 73.2 cm (23.4 in × 28.8 in)
- Location: Musée National d'Art Moderne; Paris

Le Faubourg de Collioure is an oil on canvas painting by French artist André Derain, from 1905. It is one of the first paintings in the fauvist style. It is held at the Musée National d'Art Moderne, in Paris.

== History and description ==
The painting was made during a trip that Derain and his older friend, the painter Henri Matisse, took to Collioure, in the Pyrénées-Orientales, in 1905. Both painters would the founders and the first leaders of fauvism, and the paintings they made while there, often with the same motifs, would be some of the first in the new artistic style. This in fact was one of the works exhibited at the Salon d'Automne de 1905, at the Grand Palais, in Paris.

In this case, Derain depicts a row of coloured boats in a beach in Collioure, with some fishermen also visible. His style and colours are clearly inspired by Paul Gauguin.
