= Pierre François Sauret =

Pierre François Sauret de la Borie
- Born: 23 March 1742; Gannat, France
- Died: 24 June 1818 (aged 76) Gannat, France
- Allegiance: France
- Branch: Infantry
- Service years: 1756–1801
- Rank: General of Division
- Conflicts: Seven Years' War; Battle of Hastenbeck; Battle of Rossbach; War of the Pyrenees; Battle of Truillas; Battle of Villelongue; Battle of Palau; Battle of Boulou; Siege of Collioure; Battle of the Black Mountain; Siege of Roses; Battle of Bascara; War of the First Coalition; Battle of Lonato
- Awards: Order of Saint Louis, Chevalier

Pierre François Sauret de la Borie (English: /sɔːˈreɪ/ sor-RAY, French: [pjɛʁ fʁɑ̃swa soʁɛ]; 23 March 1742, Gannat, Allier – 24 June 1818) led a combat division under the command of Napoleon Bonaparte during the Castiglione Campaign in 1796. He enlisted in the French army as a private in 1756. During the Seven Years' War he fought at Hastenbeck and Rossbach. He became a first lieutenant in 1789 and a lieutenant colonel in 1792. Assigned to the Army of the Eastern Pyrenees, served with distinction during the War of the Pyrenees against Spain. He was promoted to general officer in 1793 and became one of three infantry division commanders in the field army. He led his division at Palau, Boulou, Collioure, Black Mountain, Roses, and Bascara. He transferred to the Army of Italy in 1795. Bonaparte called him a very good soldier, but unlucky. He retired from active military service in order to enter politics.

== Early career ==
Born in Gannat on 23 March 1742, Sauret joined the French royal army in 1756 as an enlisted man in the Guyenne Regiment. He fought in a number of actions during the Seven Years' War, including the Battle of Rossbach at the age of 15, becoming a sergeant in 1763. He slowly advanced in rank until 1780, when he became an officer, and by 1792 he was a captain.

== French Revolutionary War ==
=== War of the Pyrenees ===
In 1792, Sauret served in the Army of the Alps. During 1793–1795, he fought in the Army of the eastern Pyrenees against Spain and earned rapid advancement. In October 1793 he was elevated to the rank of general of brigade. In December he was wounded in the left leg at the battle of Villelongue-dels-Monts and received promotion to general of division.

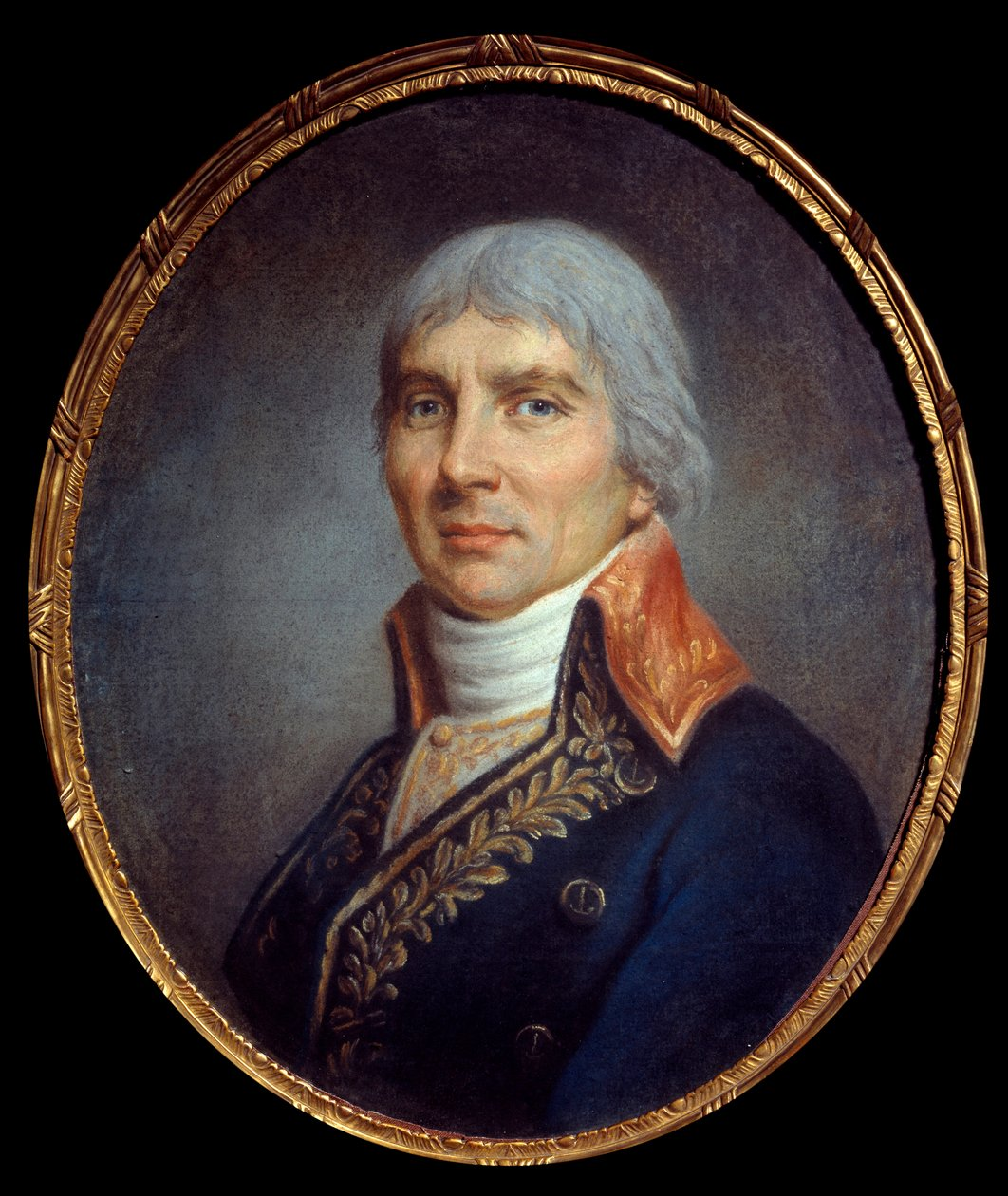
Jacques Dugommier

When Jacques François Dugommier took command in January 1794, he reorganized the army into three infantry divisions and a cavalry reserve. Sauret, Dominique Pérignon, and Pierre Augereau became the infantry division commanders and André de La Barre the cavalry leader. During Dugommier's offensive, Sauret led his troops in the French victory at the Battle of Boulou on 30 April and 1 May 1794. His troops, including the brigades of Jean-François Micas, Louis Pelletier, Jean-Jacques Causse, Jean Simon Pierre Pinon, and Claude Perrin Victor, participated in the siege of Collioure, which began the day after Boulou. On 26 May, the 7,000-man Spanish garrison surrendered, while the French Émigrés escaped in fishing boats. The Spanish surrender of the Fort de Bellegarde in September allowed Dugommier to plan an invasion of Catalonia that fall.

Sauret commanded the left wing at the Battle of the Black Mountain, where Dugommier ordered him to mount a feint attack on 17 November. Dugommier was killed by a Spanish artillery shell on the 18th, and his successor Pérignon reinforced Sauret. After four days of fighting, the French army broke through the fortifications, which were manned by Spanish, Portuguese, and French Émigré soldiers. The Spanish commander Luis Firmin de Carvajal, Conde de la Union died defending the Notre-Dame-Del-Roure redoubt on 20 November and his army took to its heels.

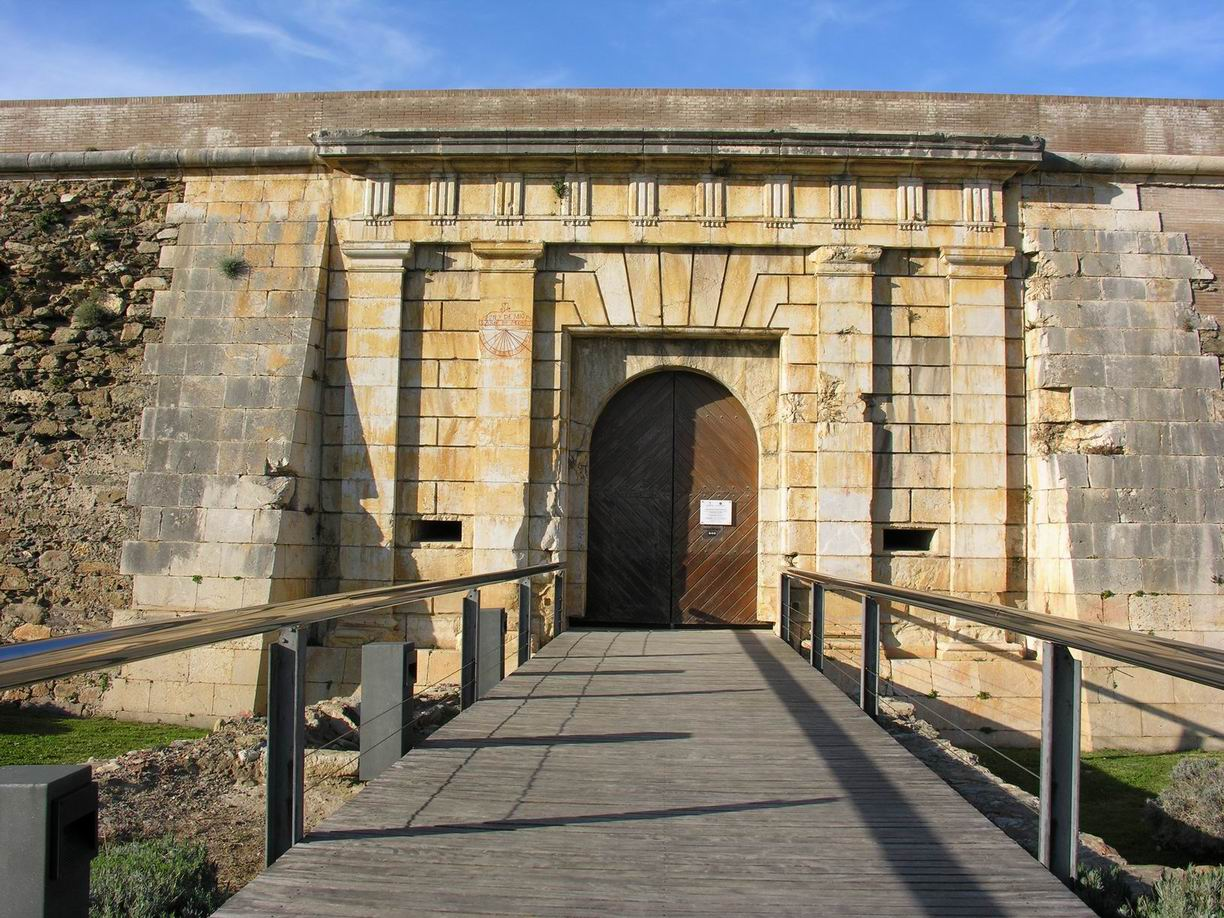
Citadel of Rosas, Portal del Mar

Pérignon quickly captured Figueres and invested the port of Rosas. From 28 November 1794 to 4 February 1795, Sauret commanded 13,000 troops at the successful Siege of Rosas in northeast Spain where he was wounded twice. His command included the brigades of Victor, Causse, Joseph Magdelaine Martin, Robert Motte, Théodore Chabert, and François Gilles Guillot, plus a small division under Jean Baptiste Beaufort de Thorigny. Pérignon and Sauret vigorously pressed the siege operations despite severe winter weather. Heavy guns were mounted on Mont Puy-Bois in order to take the Castillo de la Trinidad, a key outwork, under fire. The Spaniards abandoned the badly damaged Castillo on 1 January. On the night of 3 February, the fleet of Federico Gravina evacuated the garrison before a threatened French assault could take place.

=== Italian campaign ===
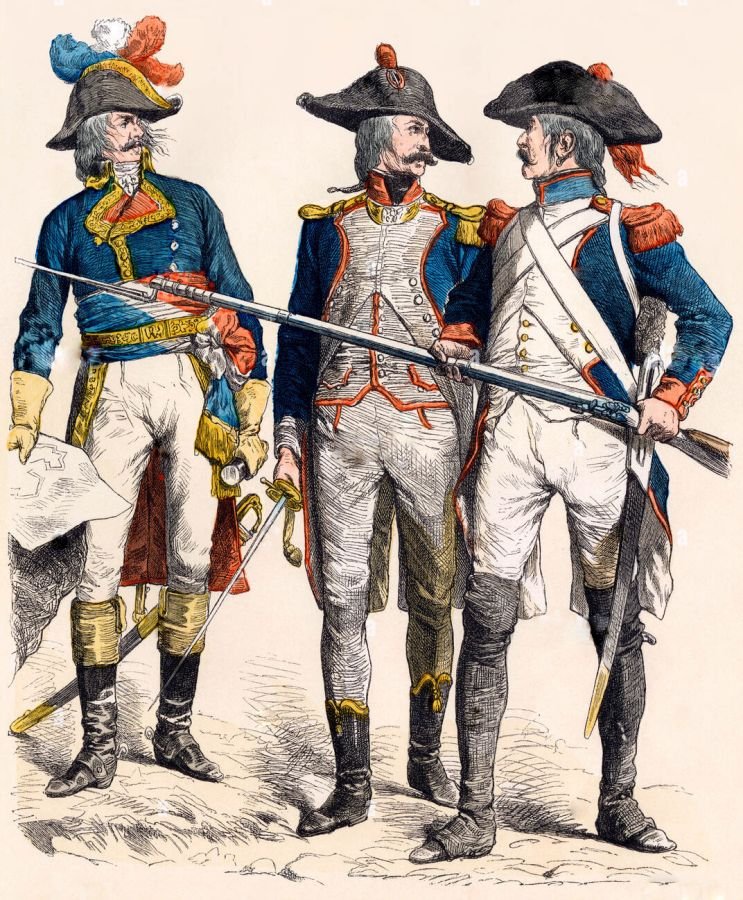
French general, light infantry officer, and line infantryman in 1795

In the spring of 1796, Sauret was transferred to the Army of Italy, then commanded by Bonaparte. He became involved in fighting during the first Austrian attempt to raise the Siege of Mantua. At the end of July, his 4,500-man division defended the west side of Lake Garda with the brigades of Jean Guieu and Jean Rusca. Bonaparte felt this force was adequate to defend the area because he believed the mountain roads were too poor to sustain major operations. When Peter Quasdanovich's 18,000-strong Austrian Right Column descended from the north, Sauret's troops were not only badly outnumbered, but also unready.

On 29 July, the brigades of Peter Ott and Joseph Ocskay seized the towns of Gavardo and Salò, forcing Sauret to pull back to Desenzano del Garda with the loss of 500 men and two cannons. However, Guieu and 400 soldiers barricaded themselves in Salò's Palazzo Martinengo and refused to give up. The following day, Johann von Klenau surprised Brescia, cutting Bonaparte's supply line to Milan. Reacting to the loss of his base of operations, the French army commander began shifting his main strength to face Quasdanovich, while Augereau observed the main Austrian army under Dagobert von Wurmser. On 31 July, Sauret marched to Salò, defeated Ocskay's troops in a fight lasting several hours, and rescued Guieu and his men. Though, he quickly pulled back to Lonato del Garda, the defeat prompted Quasdanovich to regroup his troops at Gavardo. Sometime during 1 August, Sauret was injured and Guieu took command of the division. After an intricate series of actions, the Battle of Lonato on 3 August resulted in the defeat and withdrawal of Quasdanovich. Sauret's division, still under Guieu, observed the retreat of the Austrian Right Column and missed the Battle of Castiglione on 5 August.

== Later career ==
Bonaparte replaced him in command soon after. He wrote of Sauret on 14 August, "Good, very good soldier; not sufficient intellect for a general officer; not lucky." Afterward Sauret was entrusted with the command of the fortresses of Tortona, Alessandria, and Geneva. He was elected to the Corps législatif in 1799, and became its secretary in 1803. He retired from active military service in 1801 to pursue a full-time political career. In 1813, Napoleon elevated him to a Baron of the Empire. He died on 24 June 1818 at Gannat, his birthplace. SAURET is inscribed on column 35 of the Arc de Triomphe.
