= Fort Saint-Elme (France) =

Historic French fort

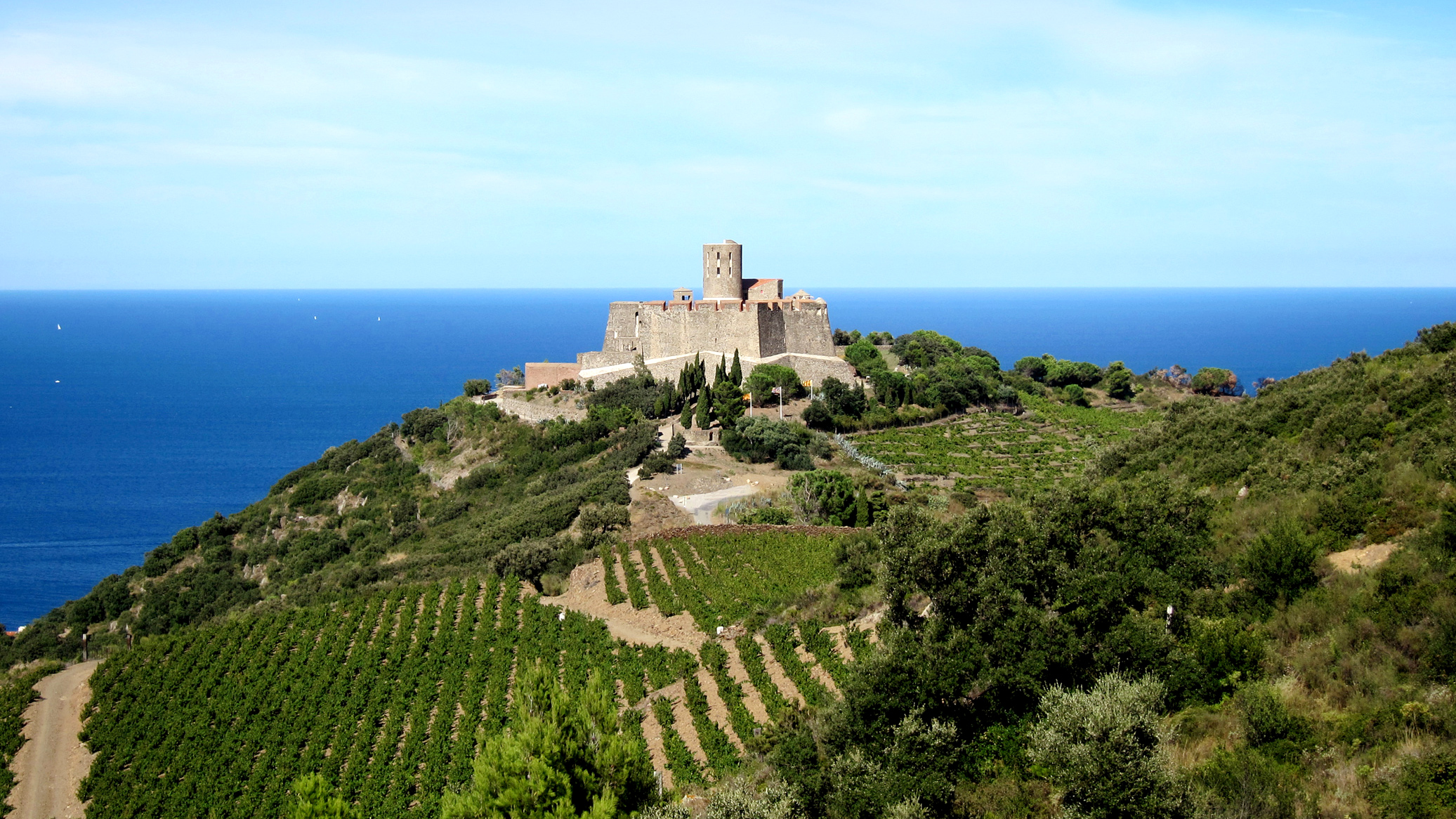
- The facade along the Côte Vermeille
- Interactive map of Fort Saint-Elme
- Location: Collioure (Pyrénées-Orientales)
- Coordinates: 42.5186°N 3.0939°E
- Designer: Benedetto of Ravenna
- Type: Star fort
- Material: Schist
- Beginning date: 1538
- Completion date: 1552
- Dedicated to: Defense

Fort Saint-Elme is a military fort constructed between 1538 and 1552 under the reign of Charles V. Situated in the district of Collioure, approximately 30 kilometres southeast of Perpignan, in the department of Pyrénées-Orientales, it is designated as a monument historique of Côte Vermeille. Since 2008, the fort has served as a museum, showcasing collections of medieval and Renaissance arms, hosting exhibitions, and offering panoramic views of the surrounding area from its terrace.

== Location ==
Fort Saint-Elme is situated atop a hill overlooking Collioure to the west and Port-Vendres to the east. The fort is accessible via a local road connecting the D114 road to the north and the Coll d'en Raixat to the south.

== Toponymy ==
Several theories exist regarding the origins of Saint Elme. Firstly, the name may have originated from Erasmus of Formia, a 4th-century Italian martyr. Alternatively, it could have been named in honour of the Spanish saint Peter González (1190-1246). This would explain the presence of this name along the western Mediterranean coasts, such as Saint Elme in Naples, Sant Elme in Sant Feliu de Guixols, Sant Helme, and Santem in Provence. Saint Erasmus is believed to have become the patron saint of sailors due to a legend that he continued preaching even after being struck by a thunderbolt. Sailors, facing danger from sudden storms and lightning, sought his intercession, and the electrical discharges seen at the mastheads of ships were interpreted as a sign of his protection, eventually becoming known as Saint Elmo's fire.

During the French Revolution, the city briefly adopted the name Fort-du-Rocher (Fort of the Rock) by decree on 3 June 1794.

== History ==
=== From the origins to the Middle Ages ===
The history of Fort Saint-Elme traces back to the construction of the watchtower in the 8th century, likely during the period of Arab-Berber occupation of Septimania between 719 and 759. Initially part of the Marca Hispanica, the tower was owned by the independent Counts of Roussillon until Girard II's death in 1172, who left his county to Alfonso II, King of Aragon and Count of Barcelona. During the Aragonese era, the tower acquired the nickname "Torre de la guardia" (Watchtower).

Between 1276 and 1344, the kings of Majorca, who used the castle of Collioure as their summer residence, reconstructed this signal tower at its strategic location. This tower became part of an effective communication network, which included the Massane and Madeloc towers situated on the heights of Collioure. These towers, funded by James II of Aragon in the 13th century, facilitated communication through smoke signals to warn the local population of impending danger. During emergencies, smoke signals (black or white, intermittent or continuous) alerted nearby communities. At night, fires were lit using dry wood to signal garrisons as far as Perpignan. During daylight hours, green wood was burned to produce smoke, allowing communication with other regional towers and strongholds. However, it was the enemy of the Kingdom of Majorca, King Peter IV of Aragon, who significantly fortified the fort's defenses after conquering the coast in 1344.

During the latter half of the 15th century, France gained control of the region of Roussillon. In 1462, King Louis XI seized the opportunity presented by the Catalan civil war (1462-1472) to sign the Treaty of Bayonne, thus annexing the counties of Roussillon and Cerdagne. The French authorities decided to fortify the stronghold, which was subsequently named Saint Elme. Some sections of the ramparts date back to this period. Louis XI's successor, Charles VIII, aimed to secure Spain's neutrality for his ambitions in the Kingdom of Naples. To achieve this, he signed the Treaty of Barcelona with Ferdinand II of Aragon in 1493, through which the Catholic monarch regained the lost territories.

=== The fortification of Charles V ===
In the 16th century, Roussillon held strategic importance for the Spanish kingdom. The region was vital, with its triangular shape bordered by the mountain ranges to the north, the Albera Massif to the south, and the Mediterranean Sea to the east. Perpignan served as a significant industrial, cultural, and commercial hub with valuable trade connections to Italy. Positioned to the north of Perpignan was the Fortress of Salses, while to the south stood Fort Saint-Elme, providing defense for the city. Additionally, this fortress safeguarded the ports of Collioure and Port-Vendres, ensuring the provision of supplies and reinforcements to the regional capital of Roussillon.

The advancement of modern artillery brought profound changes to the art of warfare and siege tactics. Architects and artillery experts emerged as new authorities, advising sovereigns on matters of war. In 1537, the Italian architect Benedetto of Ravenna drew the attention of the emperor to the vulnerabilities of the Collioure position. Following an inspection, Benedetto gained the approval of Charles V to commence construction in 1538. The works continued until 1552, resulting in a transformation of the fort's appearance, giving it a star-shaped design.

=== A French fort ===
Despite its modernization and adaptation to artillery, on 13 April 1642, French troops under King Louis XIII managed to capture the fort. The Spanish threat persisted even after the signing of the Treaty of the Pyrenees in 1659. When Vauban, the military architect of King Louis XIV, conducted a reconnaissance of the defensive structures in the Collioure region in 1659, he opted to construct a counterscarp. This addition, along with the base of the ramparts, created a ten-meter pit conducive for infantry and cannons.

Around 1780, the fort's facade was whitewashed to serve as a landmark visible from the sea, aiding in the identification of the port of Port-Vendres in conjunction with the Massane Tower.

During the French Revolution, particularly amidst the War of the Pyrenees between 1793 and 1795, the region witnessed intense conflict. Fort Saint Elme saw successive conquests by Royalists and Republicans. In 1794, the Spanish army seized control of the fort, only for it to be recaptured by General Dugommier six months later. Dugommier's forces bombarded the garrison with 11,000 cannonballs, leading to the surrender of the fort after a 22-day siege on 25 May 1794. Subsequently, following the revolutionary period, the fort, integrated into the municipality of Collioure, was repurposed as a military warehouse.

=== A private museum ===
Fort Saint-Elme was demilitarized in 1903 and left abandoned. The tower was in ruins, the shooting area partly inaccessible, and many walls at risk of collapse. On 21 August 1913, the State decided to auction the fort. Several owners took possession, but no restoration efforts were undertaken. The fort was officially classified as a Monument Historique by decree on 2 April 1927. Subsequently, a new owner opted to initiate restoration work, which concluded in 1936. During WWII, the fort was occupied by the Kriegsmarine from 1942 to 1944. Upon their evacuation, some of the buildings were dynamited to hinder Allied forces. Although partial reconstruction occurred in 1950, major restoration efforts began in 2004. Since 2008, the fort has been open to the public as a museum.

== Architecture ==
The interior of Fort Saint-Elme consists of rooms built along the exterior circumference of the tower. The first floor housed troop dormitories, a weapons room, a throne room, a jail, and an oven. Today, the floor is adorned with historical artefacts dating from the 15th to 19th centuries: helmets, knights’ armour, chests, polished-stone and iron cannonballs, medieval and Renaissance weapons (culverin, falconet, crossbows, halberds, flails, hammers, lances, bows, swords, arquebus, 16th-century pistols), and fragments of howitzers.

Other rooms showcase the monument's history, including the genealogy and life of Charles V, the fortifications of Vauban, the inventory of 1770, and the attack led by General Jacques François Dugommier in 1794.

On the second floor, the flour and artillery warehouses were situated adjacent to the guardroom and the bakery. Saint-Elme, a stronghold with an ingenious defensive system, was designed to withstand sieges and repel assaults. Some walls are up to eight meters thick, and the tower housed the powder. The artillery platform could accommodate more than 20 cannons and howitzers.

The underground areas are not accessible to the public. In the past, they served as storage for food and lodging. They could also accommodate all the trades necessary for combat.
