= Second Battle of Boulou =

1794 battle in the War of the Pyrenees

- Part of the War of the Pyrenees
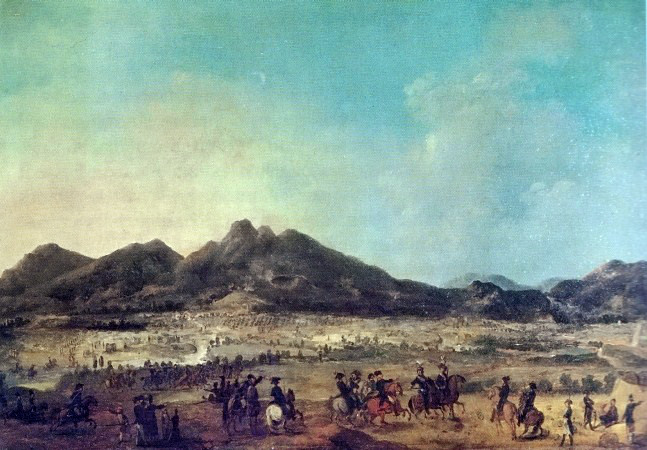
- Battle of Boulou, by Jacques Gamelin
Date	29 April – 1 May 1794
Location	Le Boulou, Pyrénées-Orientales, France 42°30′N 2°49′E
Result	French victory

Belligerents
France	Spain; Portugal

Commanders and leaders
Jacques Dugommier (French First Republic) Pierre Augereau	Luis Fermín de Carvajal, Conde de la Unión; John Forbes

Strength
16,000	15,000

Casualties and losses
20 killed, 300 wounded	2,000 killed or wounded, 1,500 captured
- Location within Europe

The Second Battle of Boulou (29 April to 1 May 1794) took place during the War of the Pyrenees, part of the French Revolutionary Wars. This battle saw the French Army of the Eastern Pyrenees led by General of Division (GD) Jacques François Dugommier attack the joint Spanish-Portuguese Army of Catalonia under Lieutenant General (LG) Luis Fermín de Carvajal, Conde de la Unión. Dugommier's decisive victory resulted in the French regaining nearly all the land they lost to the Kingdom of Spain in 1793.

The town of Le Boulou is on the Tech River 22 kilometres (14 mi) south of the department capital at Perpignan and north of the France–Spain border.

The spring of 1794 found the Spanish army holding a slice of French territory south of the Tech River and north of the Pyrenees. The Spanish right wing on the Mediterranean coast was separated from the center and left wing by a mountainous gap. First, Dugommier mounted a successful feint with his right wing that drew Spanish troops away from the center. Then, he launched powerful French forces into the gap. These forces circled behind the Spanish center and forced their adversaries to retreat across a difficult mountain pass. The Spanish suffered heavy losses of troops and abandoned their wagon trains and all their artillery.

== Background ==
=== 1793 ===
The year 1793 was a difficult time for the poorly trained French forces defending Roussillon against the Spanish army of Captain General Antonio Ricardos. The Siege of Bellegarde concluded in June with the French surrender of the Fort de Bellegarde, which dominated the key Pass of Le Perthus through the Pyrenees. However, Ricardos was repelled in the Battle of Perpignan on 17 July. The French army revived again under GD Eustache Charles d'Aoust to deal their enemies a sharp reverse at the Battle of Peyrestortes on 17 September. Five days later, Ricardos defeated the French at the Battle of Truillas.

Subsequently, the Spanish general fell back to the valley of the Tech River where he repulsed a series of French attempts to drive him back into Spain. D'Aoust tried and failed to oust the Spanish from Le Boulou on 3 October. In the First Battle of Boulou (or Pla del Rey) from 13 to 15 October, Ricardos bloodily repulsed the attacks of GD Louis Marie Turreau. D'Aoust was defeated again on 7 December at the Battle of Villelongue. The Spanish seized Fort Saint-Elme through the treason of its commander and, in the Battle of Collioure, captured the port of Collioure on 20 December, wiping out 4,000 of its garrison of 5,000 men. Soon afterward, D'Aoust was arrested and eventually executed.

=== New commanders ===
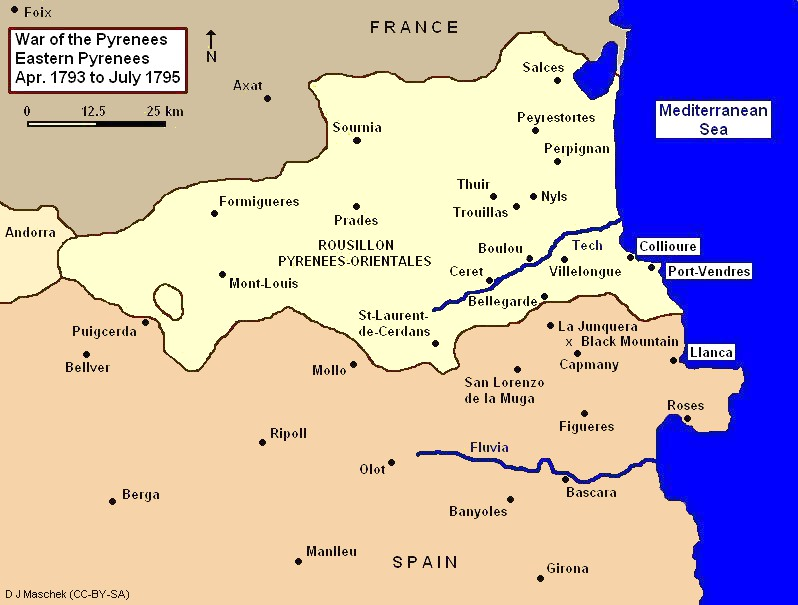
War of the Pyrenees, Eastern Pyrenees.

Fresh from his victory at the Siege of Toulon, GD Jacques François Dugommier arrived to lead the army on 16 January 1794. He began a complete reorganization of the army, setting up supply depots, hospitals, and arsenals, and also improving roads. After getting reinforcements from the Toulon army, Dugommier's field army numbered 28,000. These troops were supported by 20,000 garrison troops and 9,000 green volunteers. He formed his field army into three infantry divisions under GD Dominique Catherine de Pérignon, GD Pierre Augereau, and GD Pierre François Sauret. There was a 2,500-strong cavalry division led by GD André de La Barre and a reserve headed by General of Brigade (GB) Claude Perrin Victor.

Abstract return, French Army, Battle of Boulou
Division	Brigade	Infantry	Cavalry
Reserve	GB Claude Perrin Victor	2,669	0
Left division GD Pierre François Sauret	All brigades	7,362	100
Centre division GD Dominique de Pérignon	GB Dominique Martin	3,091	0
Centre division GD Dominique de Pérignon	GB Théodore Chabert	2,648	0
Centre division GD Dominique de Pérignon	GB François Point	2,774	0
Centre division GD Dominique de Pérignon	Detachment of the left	1,994	0
Centre division GD Dominique de Pérignon	GB Louis Lemoine	3,257	0
Centre division GD Dominique de Pérignon	GB Hyacinthe Despinoy	1,074	0
Centre division GD Dominique de Pérignon	GD André de La Barre	1,357	1,907
Centre division GD Dominique de Pérignon	GB François Quesnel	550	0
Centre division GD Dominique de Pérignon	Artillery	150	0
Right division GD Pierre Augereau	GB Guillaume Mirabel	2,039	80
Right division GD Pierre Augereau	GB Jean Joseph Guieu	4,127	0
Right division GD Pierre Augereau	Colonel Jacques Gilly	235	0

During the winter, Ricardos travelled to Madrid to discuss the campaign. He died there on 13 March 1794, allegedly after having drunk a cup of poisoned chocolate intended for the king's favorite Manuel Godoy. It is more probable that Ricardos died of pneumonia. Ricardos' designated successor, Captain General Alejandro O'Reilly died on 23 March of an intestinal illness before he could reach the front. In the interim, LG Jerónimo Girón-Moctezuma, Marquis de las Amarillas assumed leadership over the Army of Catalonia. But in late April, LG Luis Fermín de Carvajal, Conde de la Unión finally accepted command of the army. Dejected by the weakened state of the army, de la Unión had refused army command three times, saying what was needed was an angel and not a man.

== Battle ==
=== Baiting the trap ===
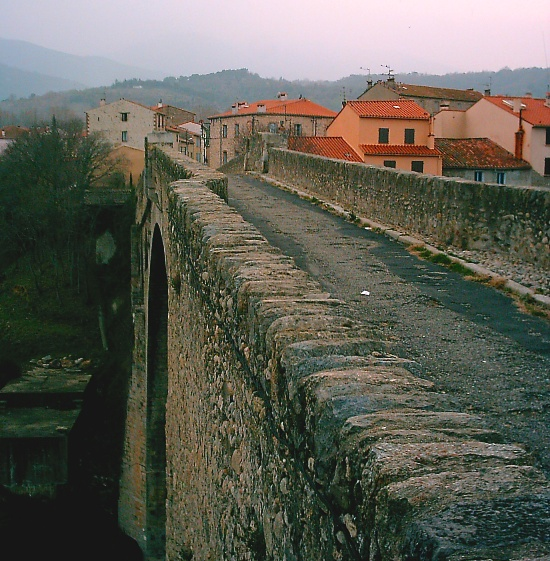
Pont du Diable in Céret, looking south toward the Pyrenees.

De la Unión deployed his 20,000-strong army to hold the Tech valley, with defences both north and south of the river. LG Eugenio Navarro commanded the right flank division, whose positions included Collioure and Port-Vendres on the coast. The 8,300-man centre division of LG de las Amarillas held strongpoints at Le Boulou, Montesquieu-des-Albères and the Camp of Trompettes. LG Juan Miguel de Vives y Feliu with 5,500 soldiers of the left division defended Céret, where de la Unión installed his headquarters. LG John Forbes' Portuguese contingent deployed on the extreme left at Arles-sur-Tech and Amélie-les-Bains-Palalda. (Note: The location of the Camp of Trompettes is uncertain.)

Dugommier placed Augereau on his right flank with 6,400 infantry and 80 cavalry. Augereau's right brigade occupied Taillet, his centre brigade Oms, and his left brigade Llauro. Sauret's division of 7,300 infantry and 100 Hussars held the coastal sector on the left flank. Pérignon's centre division represented the main French striking force with 8,500 infantry and 1,300 cavalry, backed by three reserve brigades totalling 7,000 men.

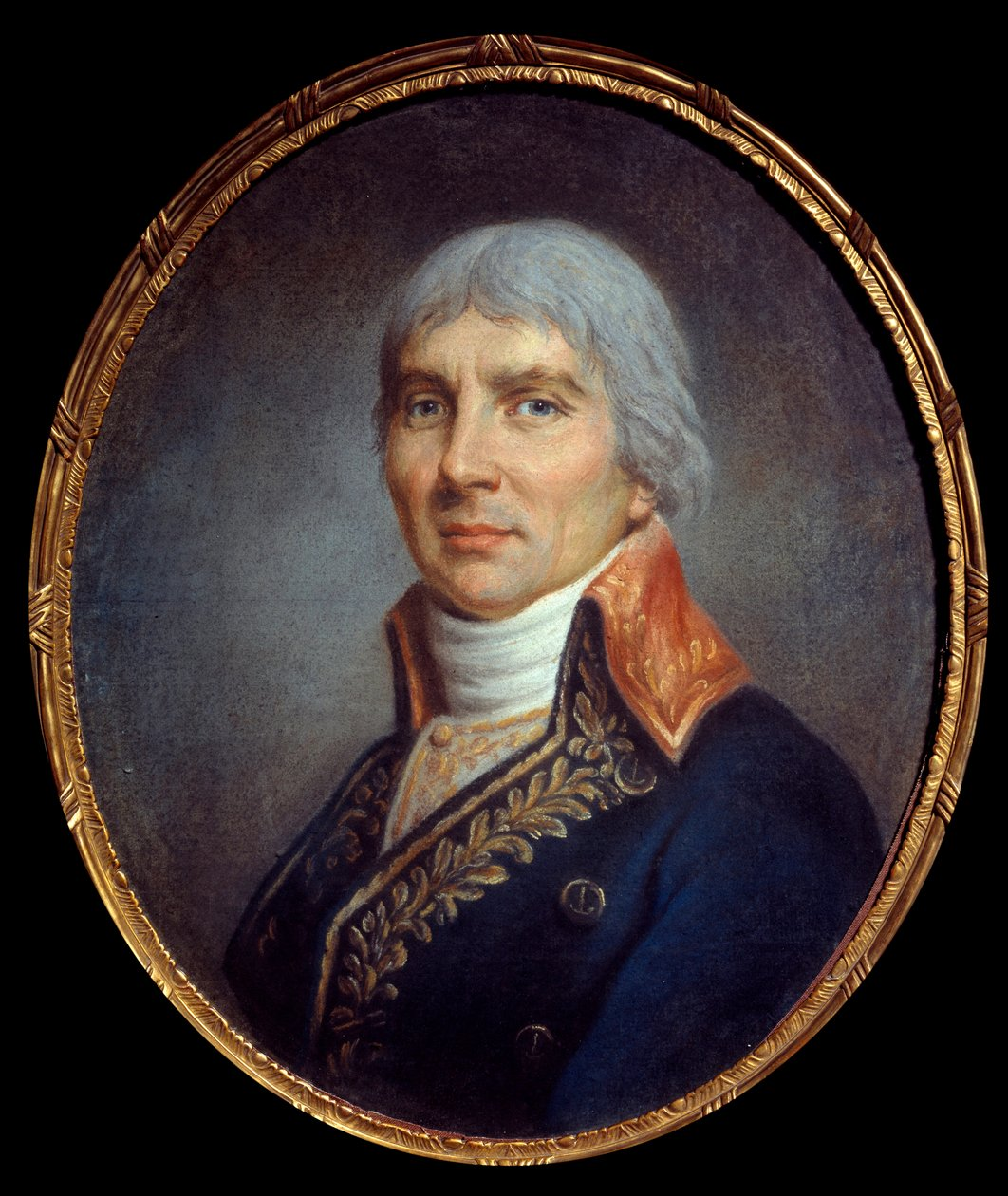
Dugommier

The French commander believed that the Spanish army's centre of gravity was too far west and planned to exploit this weakness. He hoped to cross the Tech and roll up the right flank of the Spanish centre division. To make this task easier, he directed Augereau to demonstrate in front of Céret and lure the Spanish into drawing more troops to their left flank. Pérignon held his troops back from the river to hide the true French intentions. The main Spanish communications ran from Le Boulou through the Pass of Le Perthus at 300 metres (984 ft) altitude near the Fort de Bellegarde. Dugommier wanted to force the Army of Catalonia into a retreat over the much more difficult Col du Porteille at 800 metres (2,625 ft) altitude, which was 4 kilometres (2.5 mi) to the southwest of Le Perthus. If he could achieve this, the Spanish might have to abandon their wagons, cannons, and supplies.

In late April, Augereau built a redoubt at the Saint Ferriol hermitage, north of Céret. De la Unión countered by constructing two redoubts of his own. On 27 April, Augereau probed the Spanish positions, then retired. The following day, Augereau captured one of the new Spanish redoubts, prompting the Spanish army commander to order 2,000 troops under the Prince of Montforte from his center to his left. On 29 April, de la Unión launched 3,000 troops, including cavalry led by General Pedro Mendinueta y Múzquiz, to attack Augereau on the north bank. Following his instructions, the French division commander fought a rear guard action, drawing the Spanish troops toward Oms. De la Unión finally called off the attack, but he left Mendinueta's cavalry to observe Augereau.

That night, the Spanish generals held a council of war. De la Unión's chief of staff General Tomàs Morla saw through Augereau's actions and proposed that Navarro's division attack on the right while de Vives and de las Amarillas joined forces and attacked the French centre near Le Boulou. The council voted to adopt this action, which would secure the supply road from Le Boulou to Bellegarde. As a precaution, the council decided to withdraw the army's trains by the road to Bellegarde. However, they decided there was plenty of time to issue orders the next morning, rather than that evening.

=== French attack ===
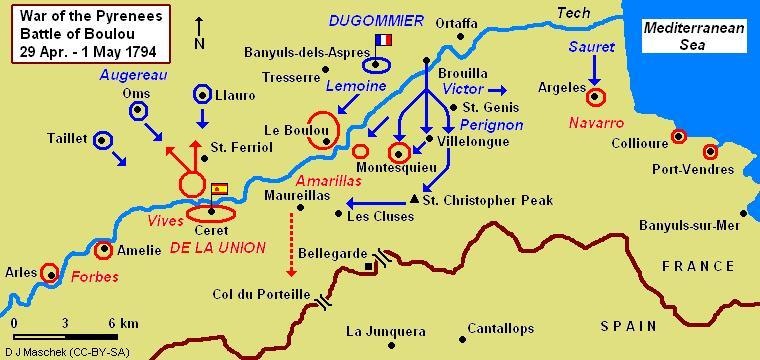
Battle of Boulou 1794 map

In the early hours of 30 April, Pérignon's division crossed the Tech at the Brouilla ford, planning to climb the mountains behind the Spanish camps in order to take the defences in the rear. Martin's left flank brigade marched past Saint-Génis-des-Fontaines and began ascending Saint Christopher Peak. His men reached the hermitage where they emplaced six cannon and 13 howitzers to fire on the Spanish positions from the rear. Then part of his brigade advanced west to cut the road to Bellegarde. Chabert's brigade advanced on Villelongue-dels-Monts while Point's right flank brigade began attacking the fortified camp at Montesquieu-des-Albères, defended by Colonel Francisco Javier Venegas. La Barre supported Point's troops, while Victor with a reserve brigade occupied Saint-Génis to keep Navarro's division sending help to the Spanish center. Two more reserve brigades under Lemoine attacked Trompettes. While these battles were being fought in the centre, Augereau retook Oms from Mendinueta on the French right flank and Sauret captured Argelès-sur-Mer from Navarro on the left. In order to give an impression of French superiority, Dugommier arrayed a large body of poorly trained volunteers near his headquarters at Banyuls-dels-Aspres.

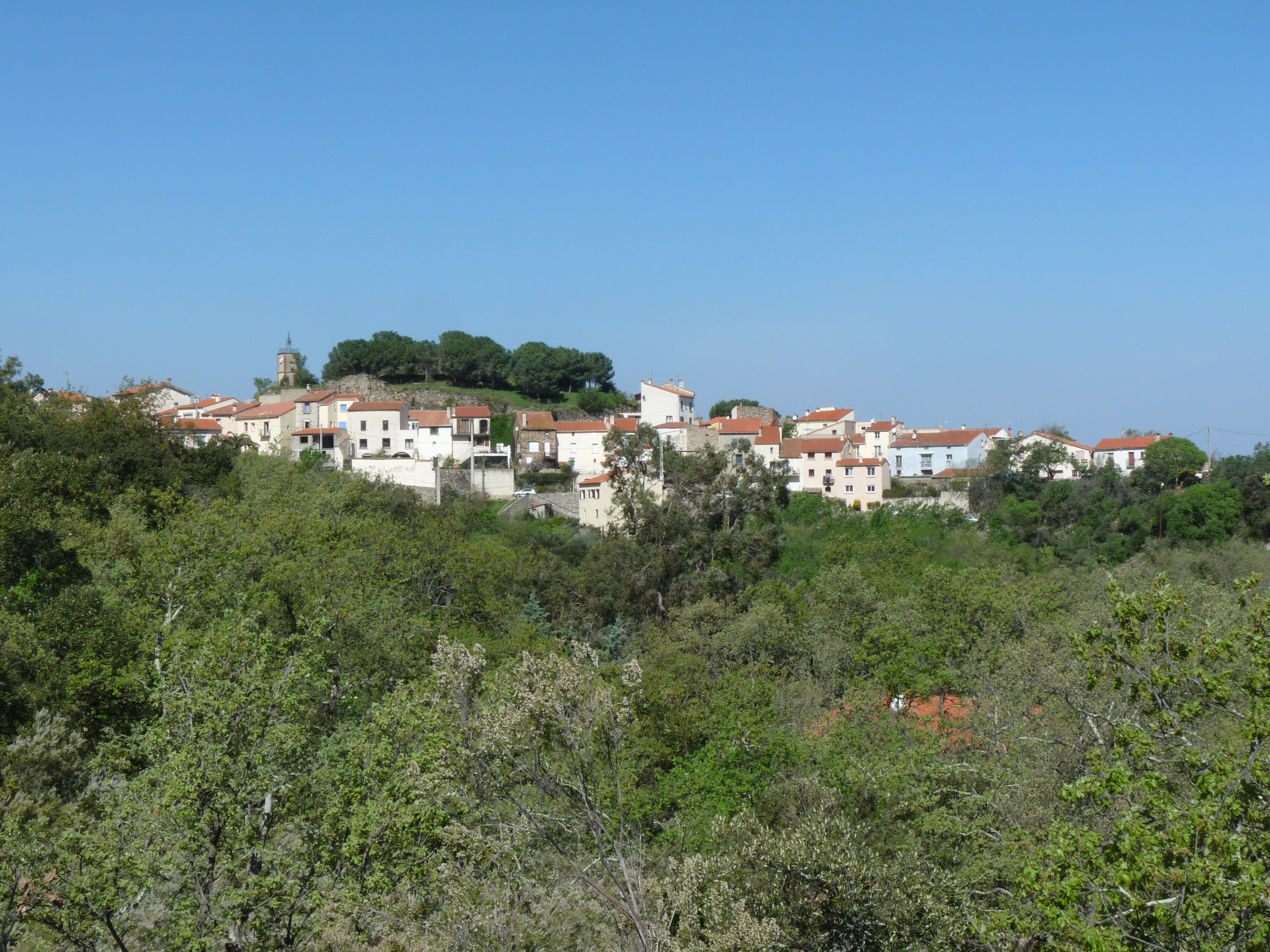
Montesquieu-des-Albères.

De la Unión sent General Montforte with 2,800 infantry and 800 cavalry to reinforce the Camp of Trompettes and General Del Puerto with 2,000 more to help Venegas. But neither of these forces were able to halt the concentrated French offensive.

On 1 May, seeing his defences fatally compromised, de la Unión made preparations to retreat. Montforte abandoned Trompettes and withdrew to the south bank across a ford near Le Boulou. That day, the French assault overran the camp at Montesquieu-des-Albères and the Spanish retreated, taking the badly wounded Venegas with them. La Barre sent Quesnel with some cavalry along the south bank to cut off the Spanish retreat, but this effort failed. On the western flank, Augereau sent troops under brigade commanders Guieu and Mirabel to push Mendinueta's cavalry back to Céret.

Chased by Quesnel's cavalry, Montforte retreated south on the road to Bellegarde. But at Les Cluses he ran into an ambush set by Martin's brigade. In a scene of chaos, a part of the Spanish wagon and artillery trains were wrecked or abandoned. The bulk of the Spanish army headed for Maureillas-las-Illas before climbing the steep road to the Col du Porteille. After covering the withdrawal at Céret, de Vives pulled out of the town and Augereau crossed the bridge to harass the Spanish retreat. The Portuguese division withdrew across a pass farther west.

== Results ==
The Spanish army suffered 2,000 killed and wounded. An additional 1,500 soldiers, 140 guns, and all of the army trains and baggage fell into French hands. French losses were given as 20 killed. The number of wounded is not given. Historian Digby Smith stated, "The Spanish army never recovered from this setback". After Boulou, the only Spanish forts on French soil were Collioure and Bellegarde. The French captured the first on 26 May while Bellegarde held out until 17 September 1794.

== Notes ==
=== Citations ===
Preceded by Battle of Villers-en-Cauchies	French Revolution: Revolutionary campaigns Second Battle of Boulou	Succeeded by Battle of Tourcoing
