= Luis Fermín de Carvajal, Conde de la Unión =

Spanish general (1752–1794)

Luis Fermín de Carvajal
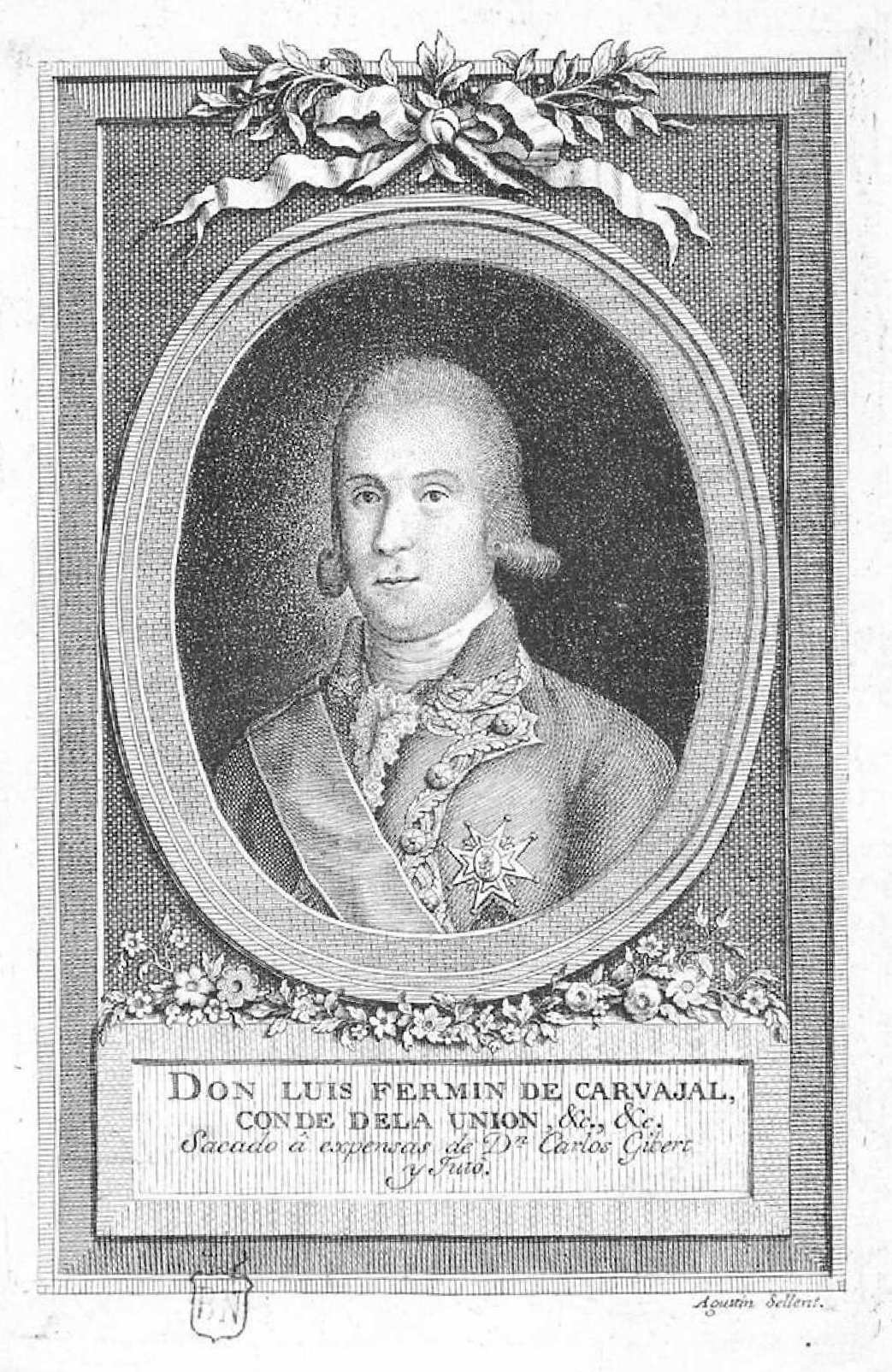
- Portrait of Luis Fermín de Carvajal y Vargas, intaglio print.
- Born: 1752; Lima, modern-day Peru
- Died: 20 November 1794 (aged 41–42); Pont de Molins, Catalonia, Spain
- Military career
- Allegiance: Spain
- Rank: Lieutenant General
- Conflicts: French Revolutionary Wars; Battle of Truillas; Battle of Boulou; Battle of San Lorenzo de la Muga; Battle of the Black Mountain †

Luis Fermín de Carvajal, 1st Count of la Unión (1752 – 20 November 1794) became a general officer in the army of the Kingdom of Spain. In 1794 during the French Revolutionary Wars, he commanded the Spanish Army in a mostly unsuccessful effort to hold back the army of the French First Republic. He died in battle fighting the French.

== Early career and 1793 ==
The son of Fermín Francisco de Carvajal-Vargas, 1st Duke of San Carlos, Luis Fermín De Carvajal was born in 1752 in Lima. King Charles III of Spain conferred upon him the title Conde de la Unión on 2 August 1778. At the outbreak of the War of the Pyrenees in 1793, he commanded the fortress of San Fernando at Figueres. Under the command of Antonio Ricardos the Spanish army was generally successful in 1793, capturing and holding part of French Roussillon. As a lieutenant general, De la Unión led a division under Ricardos in a victory at the Battle of Truillas on 22 September 1793. When Ricardos died in Madrid in early 1794, and his successor, Alejandro O'Reilly, soon after, King Charles IV of Spain appointed de la Unión to command the army.

== In command ==
In April 1794, the newly organized and reinforced French Army of the eastern Pyrenees under Jacques François Dugommier launched a powerful offensive against the Spanish foothold in France. On 30 April and 1 May, the French defeated de la Unión at the Battle of Boulou, forcing the Spanish army south of the Pyrenees. The French recaptured the port of Collioure at the end of May, and blockaded the Spanish garrison of the Fort de Bellegarde at the Pass of Le Perthus. De la Unión made two attempts to break through the blockade. The first try was repulsed at La Junquera on 7 June. The second attempt ended in failure at the Battle of San Lorenzo de la Muga on 13 August and Bellegarde fell on 17 September.

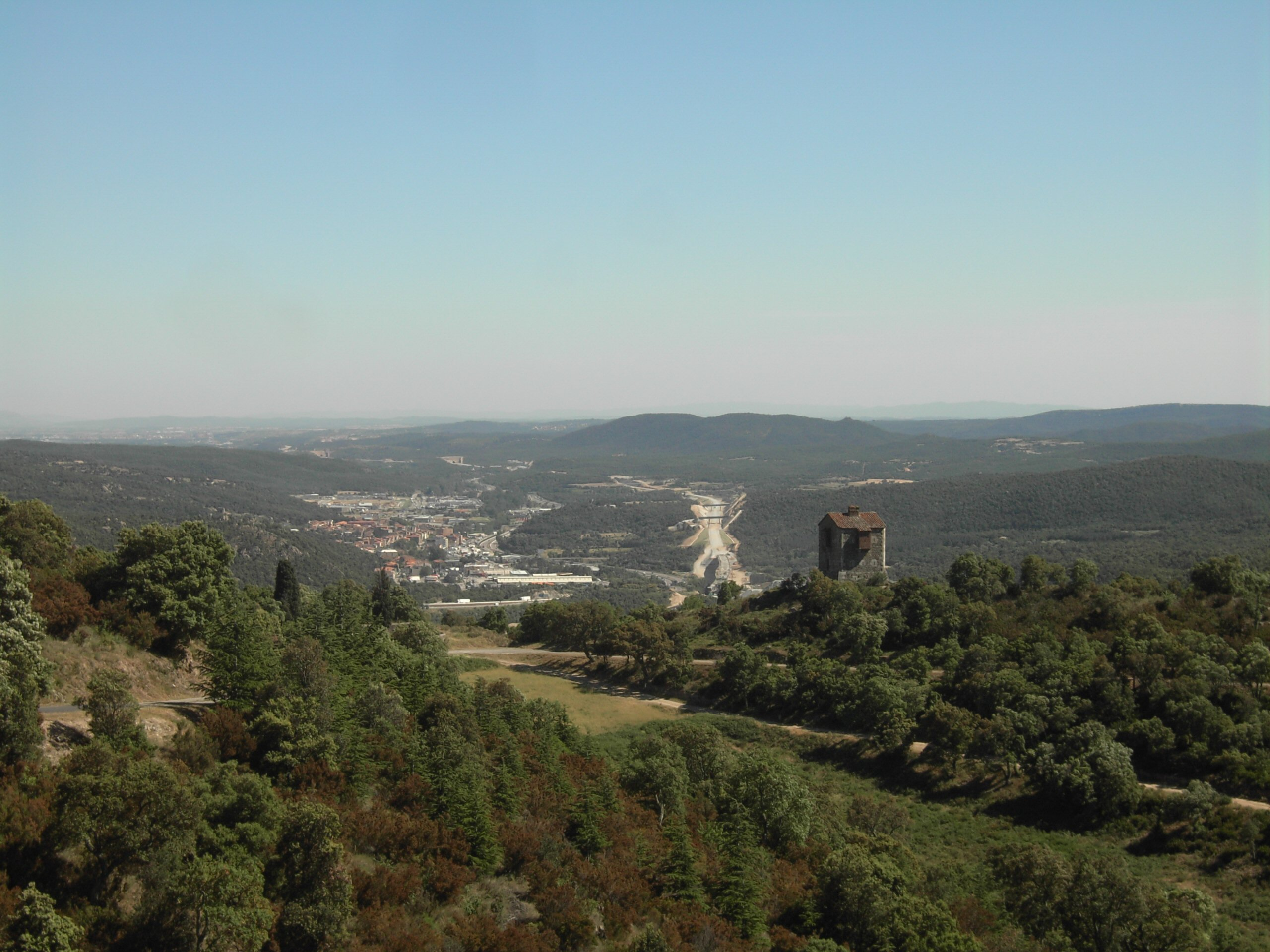
View south from the Fort de Bellegarde past the Panissars blockhouse. La Junquera is at the left center and Black Mountain (Mont Roig) is on the center horizon.

De la Unión built a chain of 90 redoubts running from Sant Llorenç de la Muga to the coast. The lines were designed to protect the Alt Emporda from French invasion, but were manned by troops of uneven quality. The best units were the Spanish Guard and Walloon Guards, with three battalions each. Regular line infantry and provincial militia also manned the defenses.

The French blow fell in the early hours of 17 November and the Battle of the Black Mountain ensued. On the first day, the French gained ground on the western flank, but were repulsed in the center and on the eastern flank. A Spanish artillery shell killed Dugommier on the 18th and his successor Dominique Catherine de Pérignon ordered a temporary halt in the fighting. On 20 November, Pérignon resumed the attack and the French rapidly broke through the first and second Spanish lines. The French assaulted the 25-gun Notre-Dame-del-Roure redoubt for three hours, finally seizing the key position at 3:00 PM. Arriving at Pont de Molins, de la Unión led a counterattack by 1,300 cavalry against two brigades of French infantry. During the subsequent struggle, he fell, fatally hit by two bullets.

The battle ended in a rout of the Spanish army. The French inflicted 10,000 casualties on the Spanish, while suffering only 3,000 losses. Jerónimo Girón-Moctezuma, Marquis de las Amarillas succeeded to the army command and retreated south of the Rio Fluvià where he was unable to save the fortress of San Fernando from capture. Girón was soon replaced in command by José de Urrutia y de las Casas. Pérignon and Pierre Sauret successfully concluded the Siege of Roses in early February. The Peace of Basel ended the conflict in July 1795.
