= Jacques François Dugommier =

French Army officer (1738–1794)

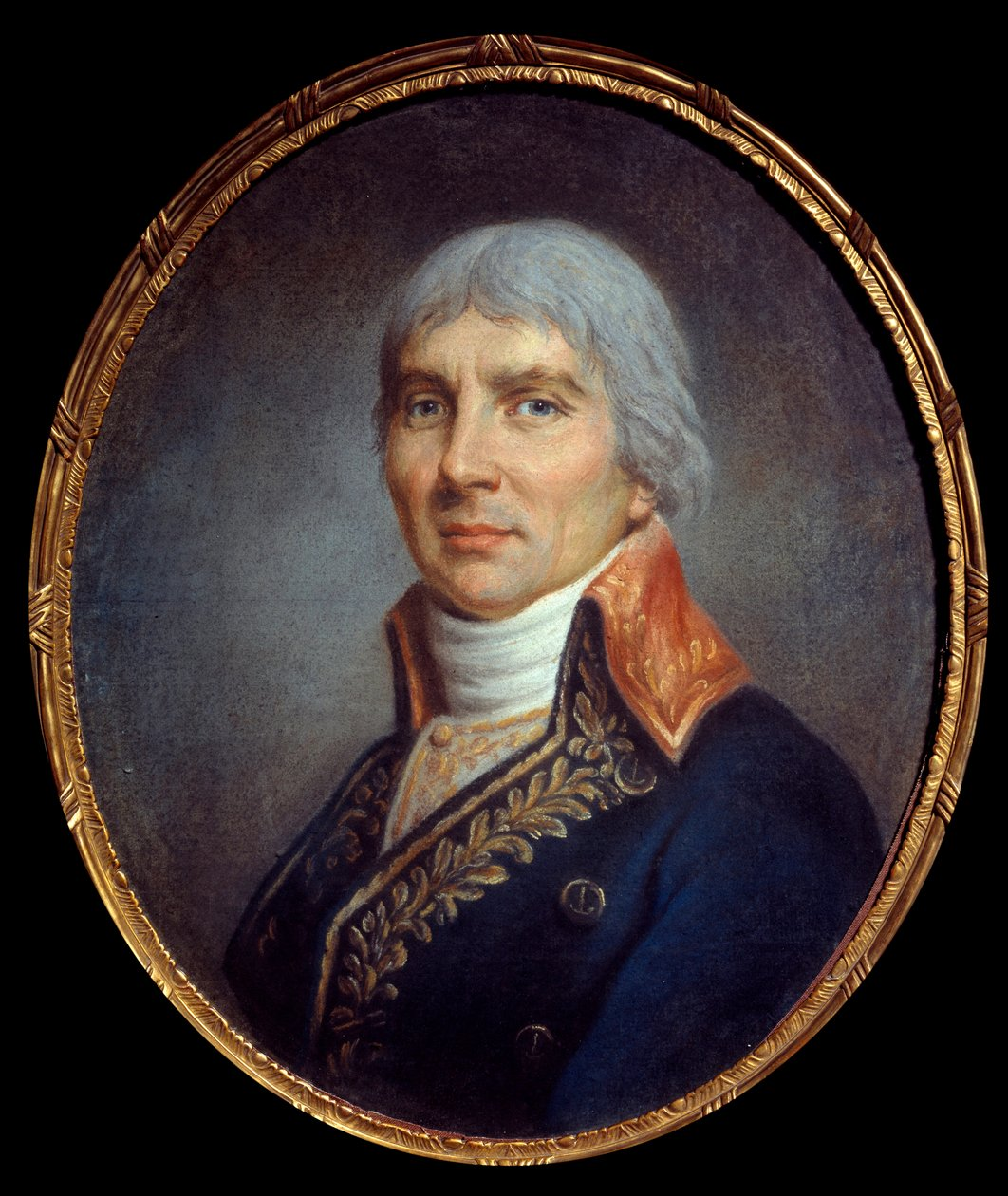
- Born: 1 August 1738; Trois-Rivières, Guadeloupe
- Died: 18 November 1794 (aged 56); Near Figueres, Spain
- Military career
- Allegiance: Kingdom of France; French First Republic
- Branch: French Royal Army; French Revolutionary Army
- Service years: 1753–1794
- Rank: Divisional general
- Commands: Army of the Eastern Pyrenees
- Conflicts: See list: Seven Years' War; Invasion of Guadeloupe (1759); Invasion of Martinique (1762); American Revolutionary War; Battle of St. Lucia; French Revolutionary Wars; Battle of Gilette; Siege of Toulon (1793); War of the Pyrenees; Battle of Tech; Battle of Albere; Second Battle of Boulou; Siege of Collioure (1794); Battle of San Lorenzo de la Muga; Siege of Fort de Bellegarde; Battle of the Black Mountain †
- Awards: Order of Saint Louis; Names inscribed on the Arc de Triomphe

Divisional-General Jacques François Coquille (French pronunciation: [ʒak fʁɑ̃swa kɔkij]), known as Dugommier (French pronunciation: [dyɡɔmje]; 1 August 1738 – 18 November 1794) was a French Army officer who served in the Seven Years' War, American Revolutionary War and French Revolutionary Wars.

== Early life and career ==
Jacques François Coquille was born on 1 August 1738 in Trois-Rivières in the island of Guadeloupe, in the French West Indies. He was the son of Germain Coquille, a planter and royal councilor, and Claire Laurent. In 1785, he took the name Dugommier after the coffee plantation Le Gommier in Basse-Terre, which he bought from his parents in 1768. Dugommier began his military career in the company of gentlemen cadets of the colonies in Rochefort, at the age of fifteen. He was employed in the naval batteries at La Rochelle and Île de Ré before being assigned to an infantry company in 1758.

Dugommier fought in the West Indies theatre of the Seven Years' War, serving in the defense of Guadeloupe in 1759 and the defense of Martinique in 1762. He was discharged at his request in 1763, with the rank of ensign of the compagnies franches de la marine, and retired to his plantations in Guadeloupe. In addition to Le Gommier, Dugommier owned the sugar plantations Grand'Anse (34 slaves recorded in 1777) and Grands Fonds, in Trois-Rivières, and Peru in Les Abymes (74 slaves recorded in 1784). He briefly returned to service in 1778, during the American War of Independence, when he led a company of volunteers at the Battle of St. Lucia. In 1765, he married Marie-Dieudonnée Coudroy-Bottée (1740-1810) in Sainte-Anne, Guadeloupe.

At the start of the French Revolution, Dugommier was one of the few planters in Guadeloupe who supported the revolutionary cause. They were opposed to the aristocratic planters, who controlled the colonial assembly and held influence over the governor of Guadeloupe. A long conflict then opposed the two camps. In 1790, part of the troops of the Guadeloupe Regiment, led by Dugommier, participated in three expeditions in support of the revolutionaries of Martinique, but failed to overthrow the governor and the colonial assembly. Dugommier left Guadeloupe definitively in July 1791, in order to represent the interests of the revolutionaries of the colonies in Paris, as a deputy to the National Convention.

== French Revolutionary Wars ==
The siege of Toulon, which Dugommier participated in

Having shown himself a true republican in the National Convention, Dugommier was made a maréchal de camp (brigade general) of the French Revolutionary Army on 10 October 1792, though he initially had no assignment. He was given command of a brigade in the Army of Italy in May 1793. In September 1793, Dugommier drove the troops of the Habsburg monarchy and the Kingdom of Sardinia from the County of Nice, and defeated Joseph De Vins' Austrians at the Battle of Gilette on 19 October.

Dugommier was promoted to general of division on 3 November 1793. On the same day, he was appointed to succeed General Jean François Carteaux as commander of the army carrying out the siege of Toulon. Recognizing that the attack plan of a young artillery captain, Napoleon Bonaparte, was the correct one, Dugommier implemented it. He suffered bruises in the right arm and shoulder while repelling a British sortie on 30 November. On that occasion, Bonaparte reported that "General Dugommier fought with true republican courage." On 17 December, Dugommier led the final assault which recaptured Toulon's fortifications, bringing the siege to a successful conclusion.

=== Eastern Pyrenees campaign ===
In January 1794, Dugommier was appointed commander of the Army of the Eastern Pyrenees, which was engaged in the War of the Pyrenees against Spain. His assignment was to retake the territory of Roussillon from the Spanish army of Antonio Ricardos Carrillo. He reorganized the army, weakened as it was by the hard combat of the preceding year spent incessantly and fruitlessly storming the Spanish positions. The Spanish became paralyzed by a leadership crisis following the successive deaths of Carrillo and his replacement, Alejandro O'Reilly, to disease, making Dugommier's task easier.

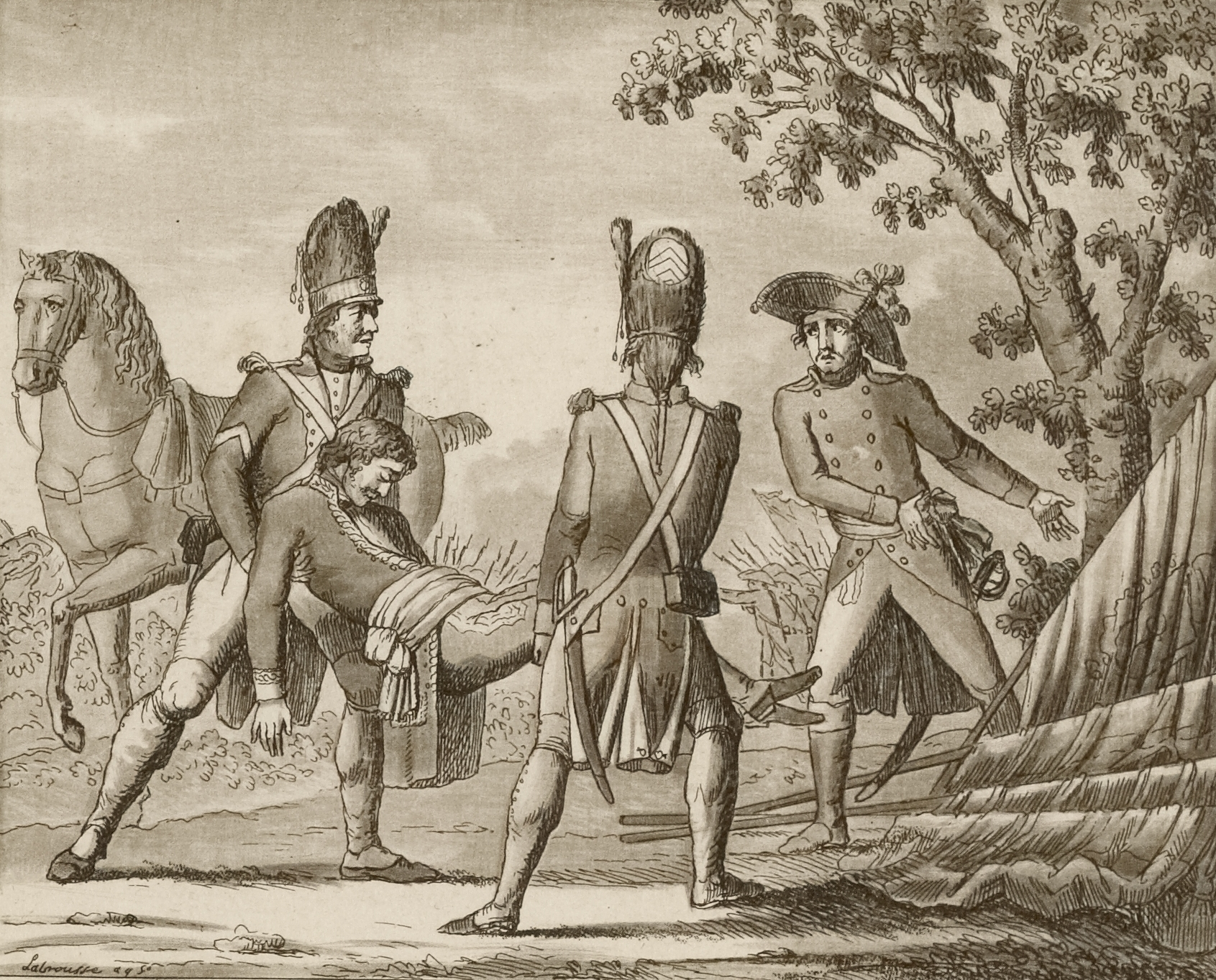
Contemporary print of Dugommier's death at the Battle of the Black Mountain

On 28 April, Dugommier was victorious at the Battle of Tech, followed by a success at the Battle of Albere on 30 April. He achieved a decisive victory against the Count of La Unión at the Battle of Boulou on 1 May, which led to the recovery of Roussillon. Port-Vendres was evacuated by La Unión (who had under his command 400 French noblemen of the Légion Panetier) in May. Collioure fell on 29 May after a four-week siege, in the course of which Dugommier was wounded. He repelled a Spanish assault on 13 August in the Battle of Sant Llorenç de la Muga, and retook the Fort de Bellegarde on 17 September (the siege had lasted since 7 May). On 22 September, an audacious attack gave Dugommier the redoubt and camp of Coustouges, putting the Spanish army to flight and capturing most of its equipment.

Dugommier was killed by a Spanish artillery shell on 18 November at the Battle of the Black Mountain. His successor in command, General Dominique-Catherine Pérignon, ended the battle with a French victory on 20 November. Dugommier was buried under a liberty tree in the Fort de Bellegarde on 19 November, and later reburied in Perpignan, where he rests in a pyramidal monument. On 25 November, the National Convention ordered his name to be engraved on a column of the Panthéon in Paris. Napoleon kept his souvenir, bestowing 100,000 Francs to his son for the memory of the Siege of Toulon.

== Legacy ==
- His name is inscribed in the Panthéon.
- The Boulevard Dugommier in Marseille is named in his honour.
- Dugommier station of the Paris Métro is named for him
- Rue Dugommier in Banyuls-sur-Mer
