= Collioure =

Collioure Cotlliure (Catalan)
- Commune
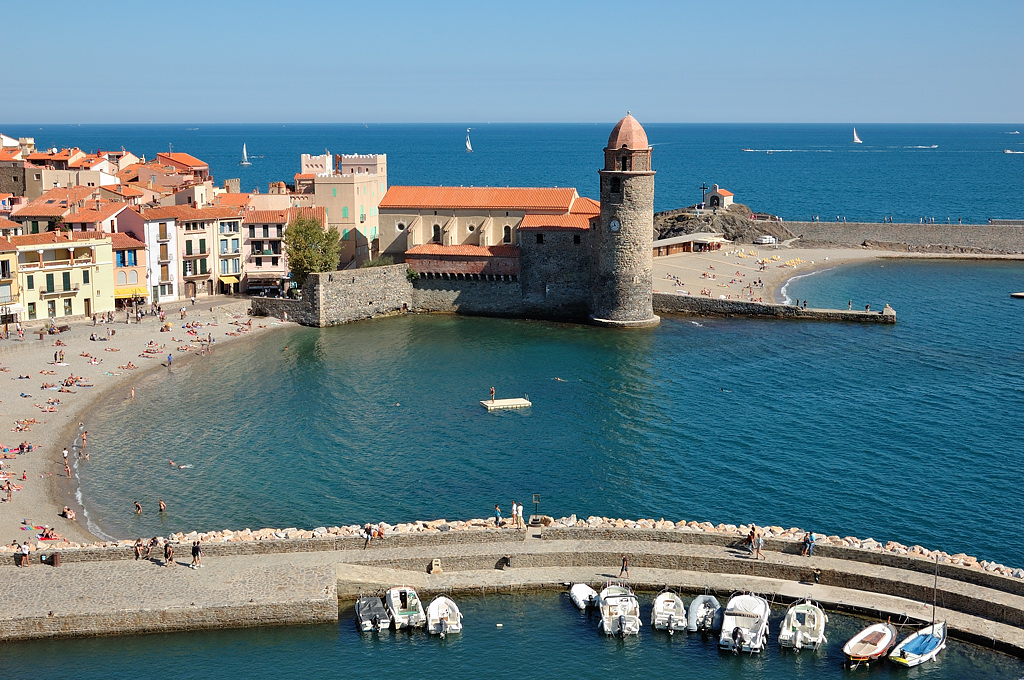
- The Church of Our Lady of the Angels in Collioure

- Coat of arms
- Location of Collioure
- Location within France Location within Occitanie
- Coordinates: 42°31′36″N 3°04′53″E
- Country: France
- Region: Occitania
- Department: Pyrénées-Orientales
- Arrondissement: Céret
- Canton: La Côte Vermeille

Government
  - Mayor (2020–2026): Guy Llobet
- Area^{1}: 13.02 km^{2} (5.03 sq mi)
- Elevation: 10 m (33 ft)
- Highest elevation: 655 m (2,149 ft)
- Lowest elevation: 0 m (0 ft)
- Population (2023): 2,756
  - Density: 211.7/km^{2} (548.2/sq mi)
- Time zone: UTC+01:00 (CET)
  - Summer (DST): UTC+02:00 (CEST)
- INSEE/Postal code: 66053 /66190
- ^{1} French Land Register data, which excludes lakes, ponds, glaciers > 1 km^{2} (0.386 sq mi or 247 acres) and river estuaries.

Collioure (French pronunciation: [kɔljuʁ]; Catalan: Cotlliure, IPA: [kuˈʎːiwɾə]; Occitan: Colliure) is a commune in the southern French department of Pyrénées-Orientales.

== Geography ==
The town of Collioure is on the Côte Vermeille (Vermilion Coast), in the canton of La Côte Vermeille and in the arrondissement of Céret.

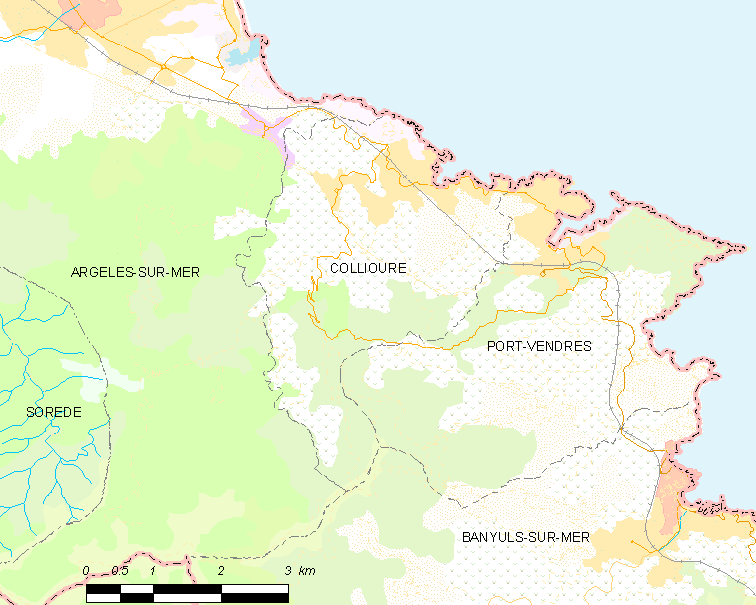
Map of Collioure and its surrounding towns

== Toponymy ==
Collioure is named Cotlliure in Catalan.

== History ==
There is a record of the castle at "Castrum Caucoliberi" having been mentioned as early as 673, indicating that the settlement here was of strategic and commercial importance during the Visigoth ascendancy.

Collioure used to be divided into two villages separated by the river Douy, the old town to the south named Port d'Avall (in French known as Le Faubourg) and the upstream port, Port d'Amunt (in French known as Le Mouré).

Collioure was taken in 1642 by the French troops of Maréchal de la Meilleraye. A decade later, the town was officially surrendered to France by the 1659 Treaty of Pyrenees. Because of its highly strategic importance, the town's fortifications, the Château Royal de Collioure and the Fort Saint-Elme stronghold, were improved by the military engineer Vauban during the reign of Louis XIV. Nevertheless, Collioure was besieged and occupied by the Spanish troops in 1793, marking the last Spanish attempt to take the city. The city was retaken a year later by general Jacques François Dugommier.

In 1823, the territory of Port-Vendres became a commune, taking parts from the communes of Collioure and Banyuls-sur-Mer.

On 21 January 1870, an exceptional climatic phenomenon occurred in Collioure, as observed by Charles Naudin at the time; more than one metre (39 inches) of snow fell in one day on the town. Many orchards as well as cork oak woodlands were damaged.

== Government and politics ==
=== Mayors ===
Mayor	Term start	Term end
Michel Noë	1864	1870
Jean Cortade	1870	1874
Jean Caloni	1874	1878
Jean Coste	1878	1903
Joseph Rossines	1903	1919
Marceau Banyuls	1948	1953
Vincent Atxer	1953	1956
Henri Billard	1956	1956
René Ramona	1956	1966
Joseph Py	1966	1977
Jean Pascot	1977	1989
Michel Moly	1989	2014
Jacques Manya	2014	

=== Twin city ===
- Soria, Castile and León, Spain.

== Population ==
Historical population
Year	Pop.	±% p.a.
1968	2,525	—
1975	2,516	−0.05%
1982	2,527	+0.06%
1990	2,726	+0.95%
1999	2,763	+0.15%
2007	2,944	+0.80%
2012	3,082	+0.92%
2017	2,427	−4.67%
2023	2,756	+2.14%
Source: INSEE

== Economy ==
Collioure is an Appellation d'Origine Contrôlée (AOC) situated around the town, (Collioure AOC), producing red, rosé and a few white wines. The ancient terraced vines in the hills behind the town also provide grapes for the apéritif and dessert wines of the (Banyuls) appellation, which shares its boundaries with the Collioure appellation.

Collioure is also famous for its anchovies, and its once-thriving fisheries are referenced in Mark Kurlansky's book Salt.

== Culture ==
As the town has a strong Catalan culture, its own motto has been adopted by one of the local Catalan rugby teams (USA Perpignan, France): Sempre endavant, mai morirem (Always forward, We'll never die). Under Michel Moly's leadership, the town has an alternative motto, Collioure sera toujours Collioure (Collioure shall always be Collioure) quoting French singer Maurice Chevalier's famous song titled Paris sera toujours Paris.

The annual Saint Vincent festival is held around August 15, attracting twice the town's population in visitors for several days of celebration with music and fireworks.

In the early 20th century Collioure became a center of artistic activity, with several Fauve artists making it their meeting place. André Derain, Georges Braque, Othon Friesz, Henri Matisse, Pablo Picasso, Charles Rennie Mackintosh, James Dickson Innes, Léopold Survage and Tsuguharu Fujita have all been inspired by Collioure's royal castle, medieval streets, its lighthouse converted into the church of Notre-Dame-des-Anges and its typical Mediterranean bay. Collioure's cemetery contains the tomb of Spanish poet Antonio Machado, who fled here to escape advancing Francoist troops at the end of the Spanish Civil War in 1939.

The British novelist Patrick O'Brian lived in the town from 1949 until his death in 2000, and his novel The Catalans describes Collioure life as it was in the past. He also wrote a biography of Picasso, who was an acquaintance. O'Brian and his wife Mary are also buried in the town cemetery.

The start of Rose Macaulay’s 1950 novel, The World My Wilderness, is set in Collioure.

Part of the action in Stephen Clarke's fourth comic novel featuring Paul West, Dial M for Merde, takes place in Collioure.

Ninety-eight reproductions of Matisse’s and Derain’s works are displayed exactly where these two masters of Fauvism painted the originals in the early 20th century.

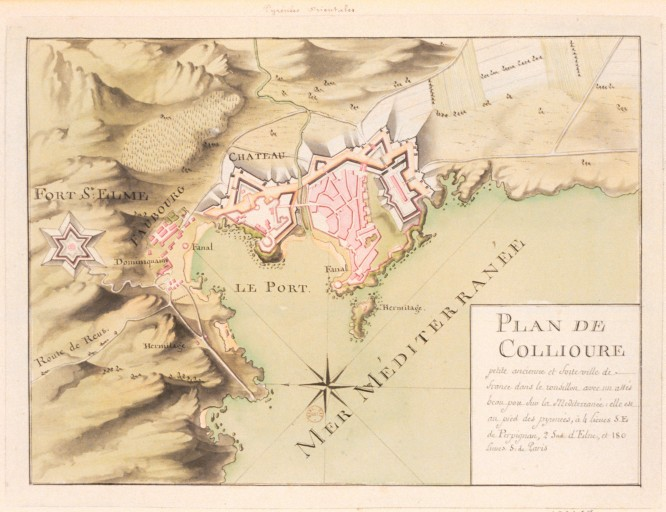
Map of Collioure (18th century)

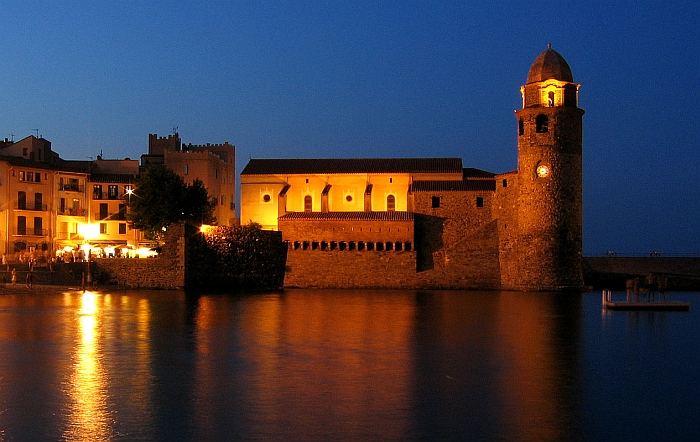
Collioure's church, Notre-Dame-des-Anges

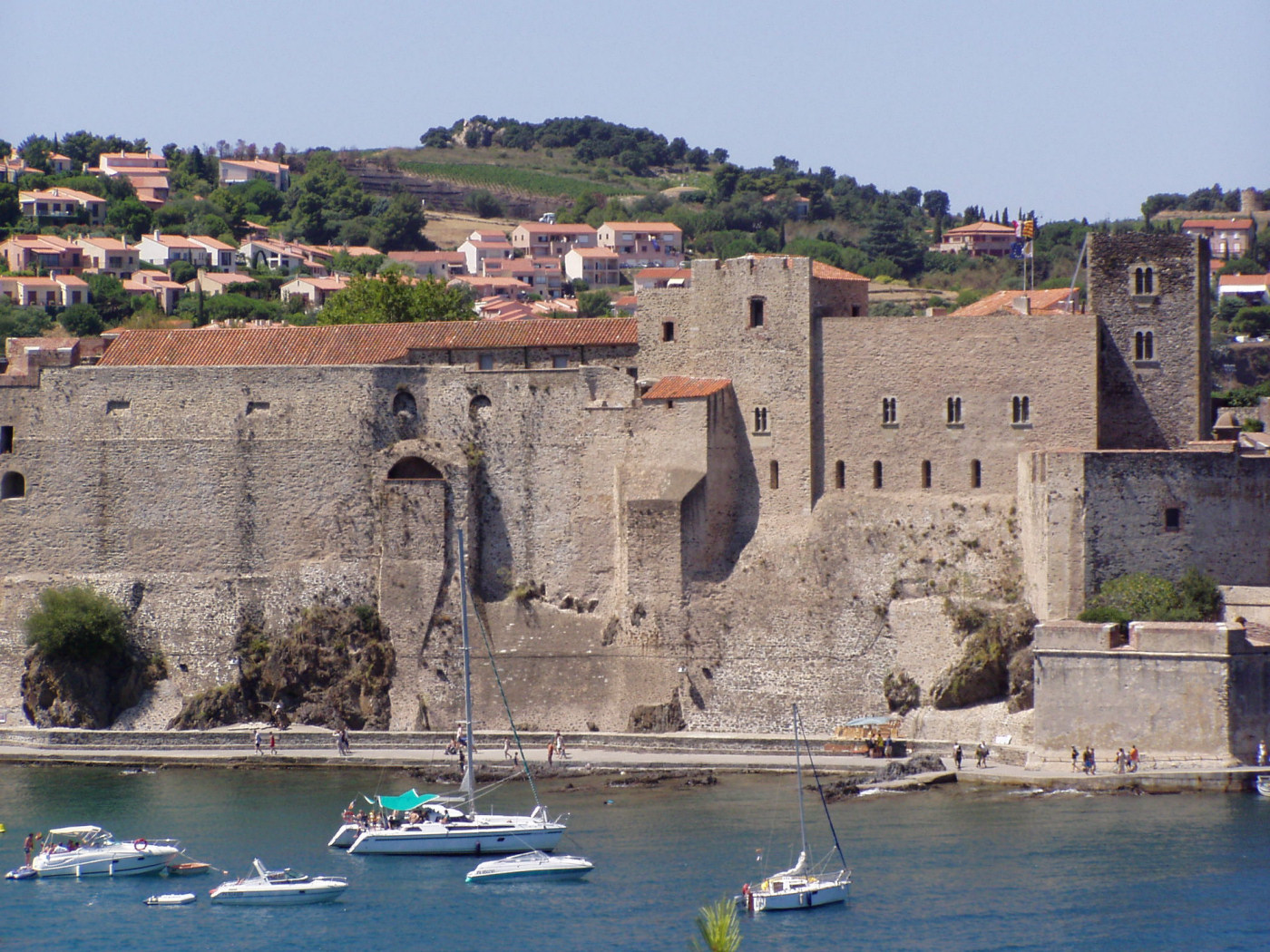
Château Royal de Collioure

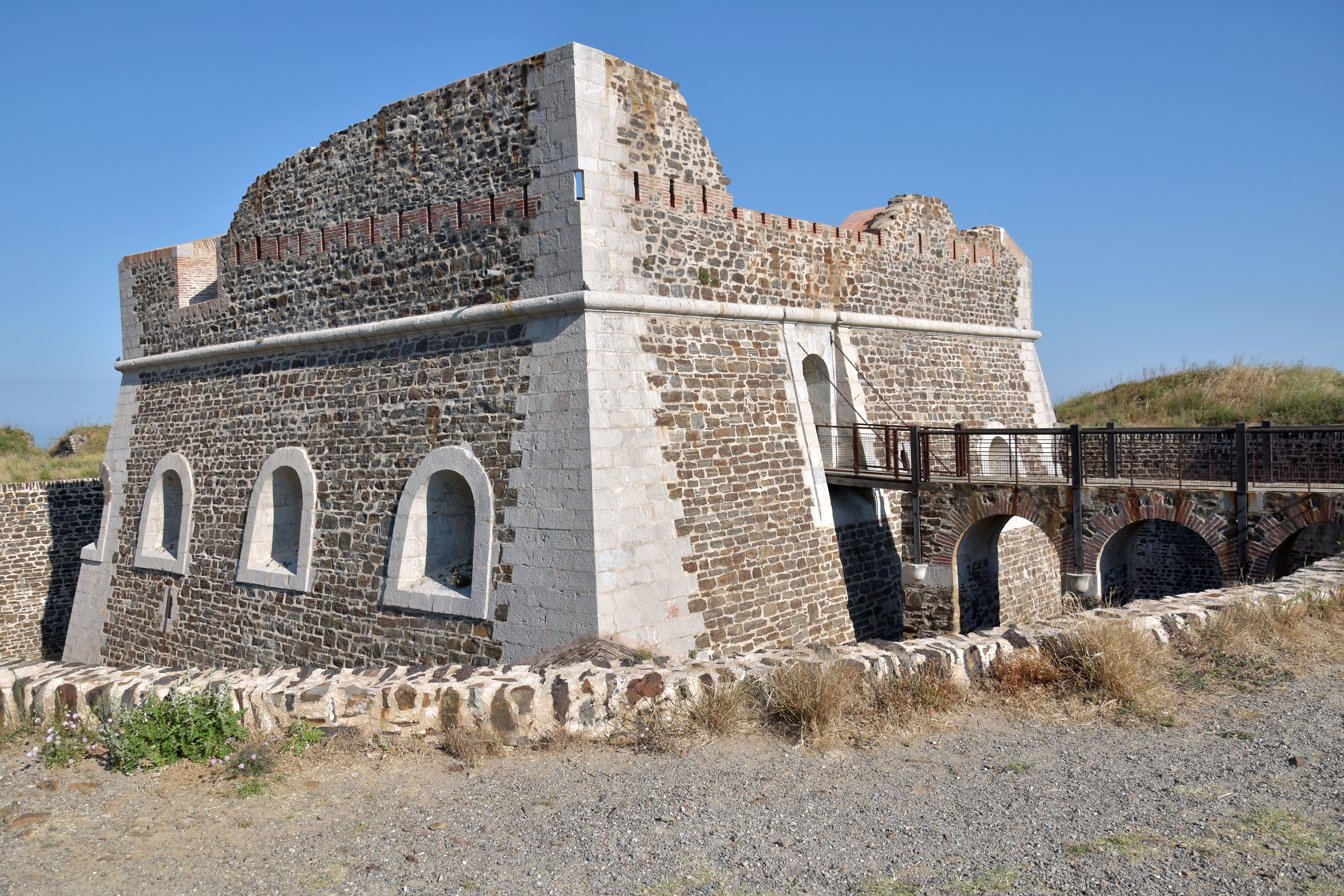
Fort Carré

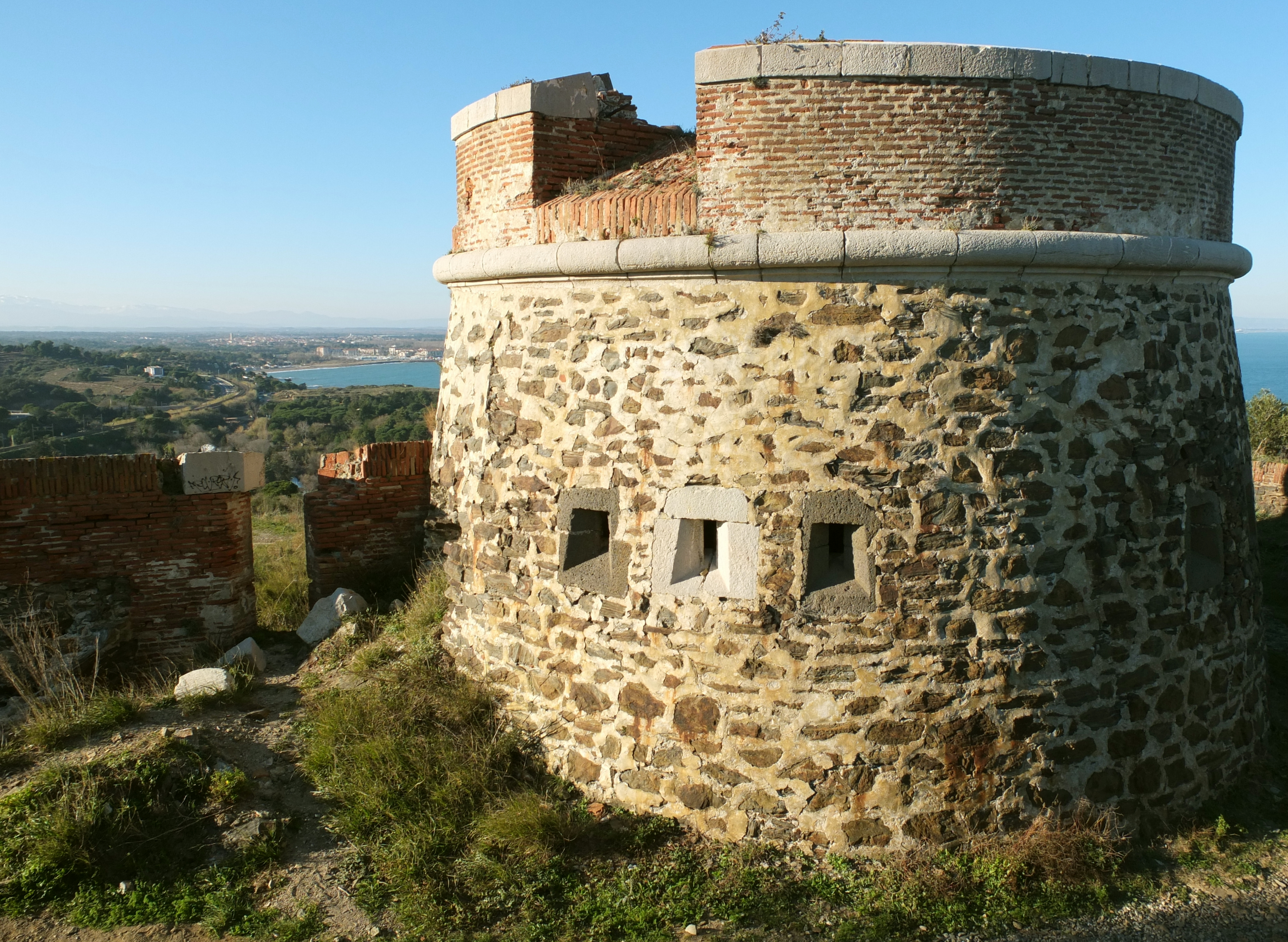
Tour de l' Étoile

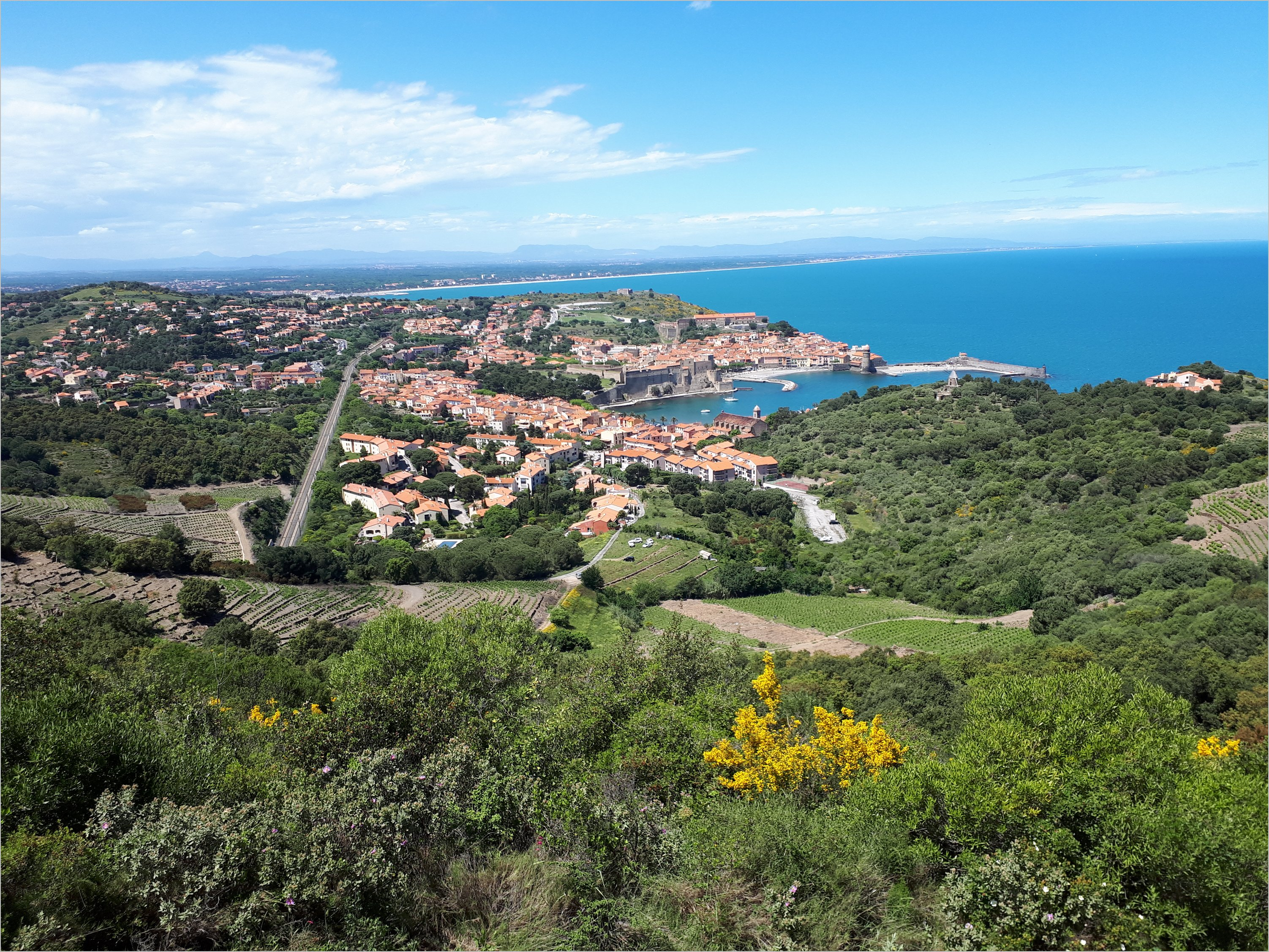
Collioure, seen from the south-east

== Notable people ==
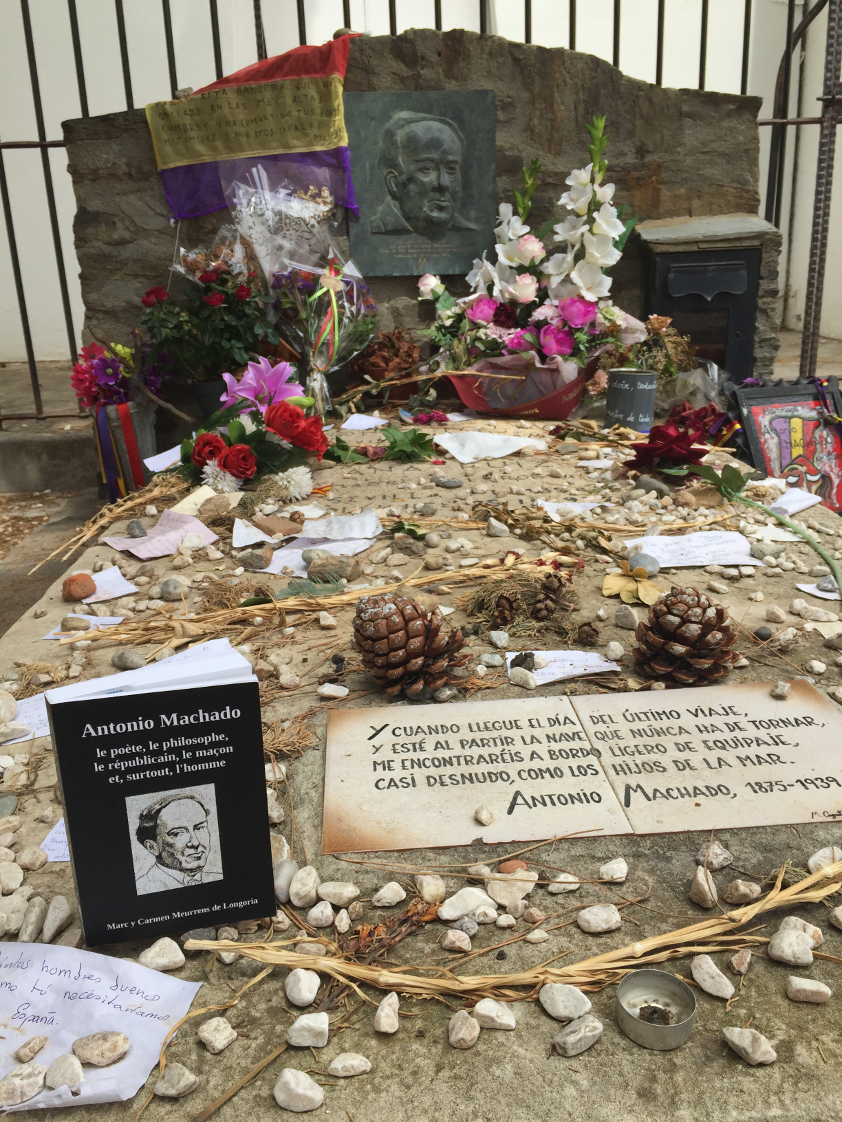
Machado's grave.

- Nur Ali Sheikh (1928–), Kenyan-born neo-cubist painter who lived in the house depicted by Matisse in his View of Collioure
- Marie Barrère-Affre (1885–1963) writer, lived and died in Collioure.
- René Llense (1913–2014), football player born in Collioure.
- Antonio Machado (1875–1939), Spanish poet died in Collioure.
- Margaret Macdonald Mackintosh (1864 – 1933), Scottish artist and designer, lived in Collioure in 1924 and stayed in the area until 1927.
- Charles Rennie Mackintosh (1868 – 1928), Scottish architect, artist and designer, and husband of Margaret also lived there.
- Patrick O'Brian (1914–2000), English novelist and translator, lived and was buried in Collioure.
- Jacques Parizeau (1930–2015), former premier of Quebec Canada, owned a vineyard in Collioure.

== See also ==
- Communes of the Pyrénées-Orientales department
