= Guillaume Mirabel =

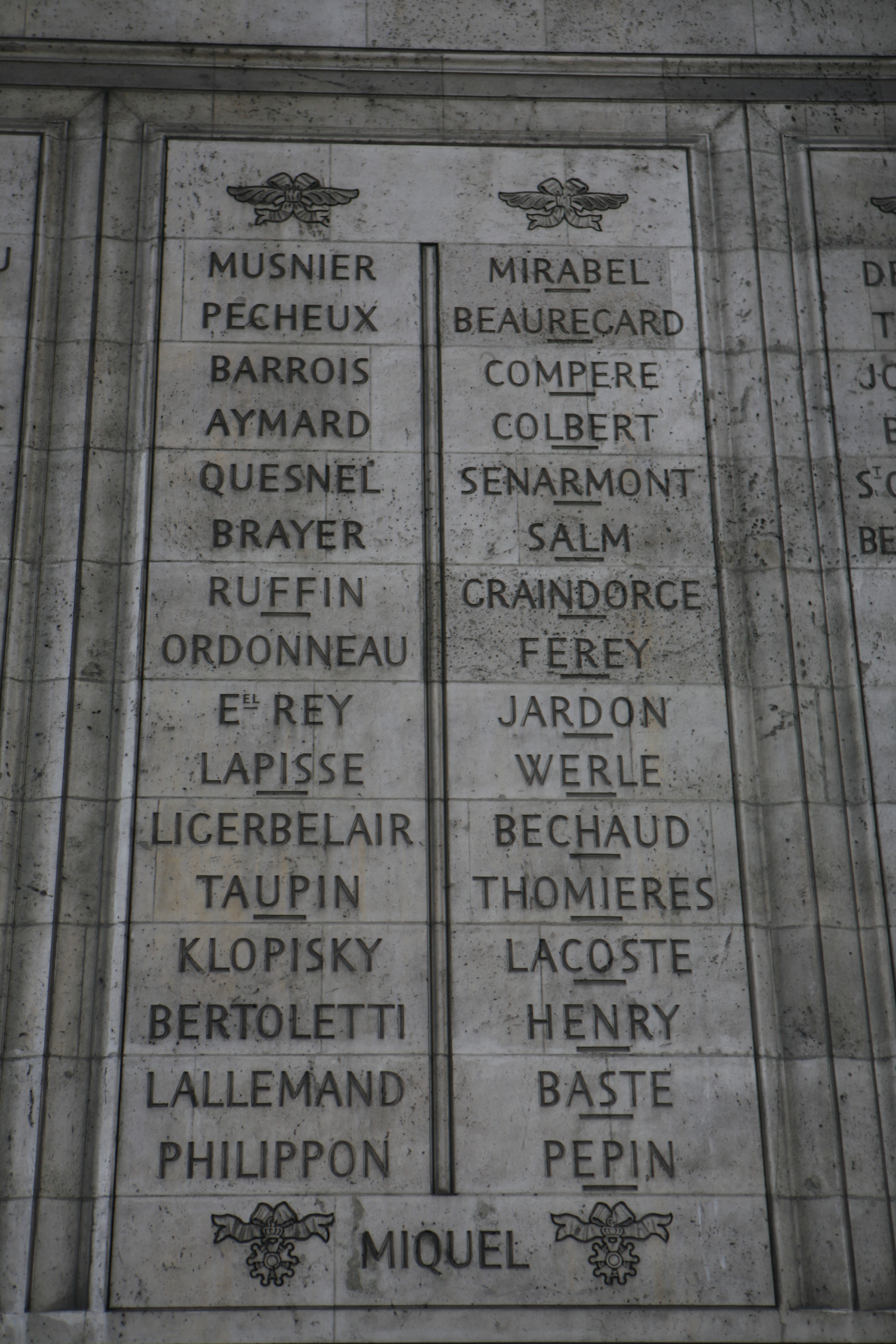
- MIRABEL is the first name in column 38 under the Arc de Triomphe.
- Born: 29 August 1744; Fitou, Languedoc, Kingdom of France
- Died: 13 August 1794 (aged 49) Sant Llorenç de la Muga, Spain
- Allegiance: Kingdom of France; France
- Branch: Cavalry, Infantry
- Service years: 1768–1772, 1793–1794
- Rank: General of Brigade
- Conflicts: War of the Pyrenees; Battle of Mas Deu; Battle of Perpignam; Battle of Peyrestortes; Second Battle of Boulou; First Battle of Sant Llorenç de la Muga; Battle of Sant Llorenç de la Muga †

Guillaume Mirabel (29 August 1744 – 13 August 1794) became a general of brigade in the army of Republican France during the French Revolutionary Wars. He was born in the south of France and enlisted in the French Royal Army as a dragoon in 1768. Appointed a cavalry instructor, he fought in the Army of the Eastern Pyrenees against the Kingdom of Spain. In 1793, he fought at the battles of Mas Deu, Perpignan, Peyrestortes, and Truillas, and was wounded four times. He led a brigade at Second Boulou in May 1794. A promising leader, Mirabel was killed in action while leading his troops at the Battle of Sant Llorenç de la Muga. MIRABEL is one of the names inscribed under the Arc de Triomphe.

== Early career ==
Guillaume Mirabel was born on 29 August 1744 at Fitou in what is now the department of Aude, France. On 11 April 1768, he enlisted in the Languedoc Dragoon Regiment and served until 31 December 1772, when he was dismissed. On 1 October 1780, he was hired as a weigher by the customs office at Agde. On 12 May 1793, the Representatives on mission appointed Mirabel cavalry instructor for the departments of Gard and Hérault, with the rank of lieutenant.

== War of the Pyrenees ==
Mirabel was wounded four times; the first time occurred at the Battle of Mas Deu on 19 May 1793 when he was struck by a bullet in the leg. The commander of the French Army of the Eastern Pyrenees, Louis-Charles de Flers instructed Luc Siméon Auguste Dagobert and 5,000 to defend Mas Deu. The Spanish commander Antonio Ricardos attacked the position with 15,000 men and drove off the French. Mirabel was promoted captain and assigned as instructor of the cavalry and light artillery of the army. On 17 July, he was wounded again by a saber stroke to his right shoulder at the Battle of Perpignan. On this occasion, Ricardos mounted a direct assault of the camp at Perpignan but was driven off by well-handled French artillery. The French tried to harass their retreating foes, but the Spanish cavalry stopped pursuit. Despite the victory, de Flers was replaced by Hilarion Paul Puget de Barbantane on 7 August. De Flers was later executed during the Reign of Terror.

Mirabel was wounded for the third time by a saber blow to his head during a skirmish at Thuir on 29 August 1793. At this time, Ricardos established four fortified camps surrounding Perpignan. The fourth camp at Peyrestortes northwest of Perpignan threatened to isolate the city completely. At this, Barbantane panicked and cravenly abandoned his army, leaving Eustache Charles d'Aoust in command at Perpignan and Jacques Gilles Henri Goguet leading an outlying division at Salses-le-Château. In the Battle of Peyrestortes on 17 September 1793, d'Aoust and Goguet cooperated in attacking and capturing the Spanish camp. In this action, Mirabel was wounded a fourth time by a saber stroke in his right hand. On 27 September, he was appointed to lead the army's mounted flankers.

Mirabel was raised in rank to general of brigade on 23 December 1793. After Peyrestortes, the Army of Eastern Pyrenees fought the Battle of Truillas on 22 September, the First Battle of Boulou on 3–4 and 14–15 October, and the Battle of Villelongue on 7 and 18 December 1793. At the Second Battle of Boulou on 30 April 1794, Mirabel commanded a brigade in Charles-Pierre Augereau's Right Division in Jacques François Dugommier's Army of the Eastern Pyrenees. The brigade counted 2,039 infantry and 80 cavalry. On 6 May, Augereau defied orders and advanced to seize Sant Llorenç de la Muga where the Spanish had a cannon foundry. Preoccupied with the siege of the Fort de Bellegarde and the Siege of Collioure, Dugommier allowed Augereau to ignore his wishes and remain at the foundry. On 19 May 1794 in the First Battle of Sant Llorenç de la Muga, 15,000 Spanish troops led by Luis Fermín de Carvajal, Conde de la Unión attacked Augereau's 6,000. The assault was poorly managed and Augereau handled his division with skill. The French were able to repel their numerically superior foes with serious losses. During the battle, Mirabel's brigade defeated the brigades of Francisco Solano and Juan Miguel de Vives.

== Death ==
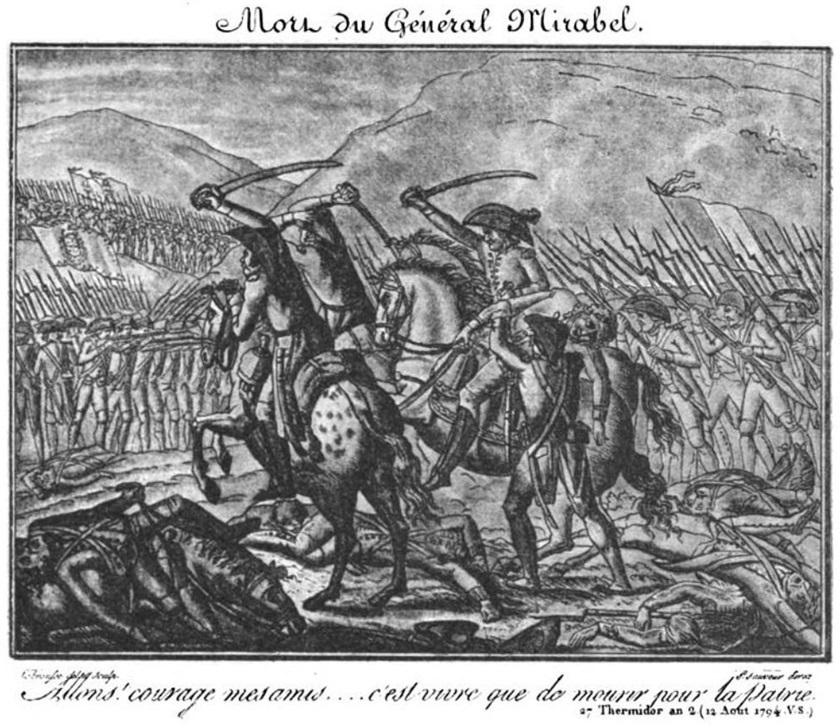
Death of General Mirabel on 13 August 1794

The French captured Collioure on 26 May 1794, but Bellegarde continued to hold out through the summer. Since its garrison was running short of provisions, Conde de la Unión determined either to break the siege or to send a food convoy into the fortress. The Spanish commander ordered a major attack on 13 August 1794, which resulted in the Second Battle of Sant Llorenç de la Muga. Dugommier commanded 34,000 troops while Conde de la Unión's army numbered 45,000. The Spanish massed 22,000 soldiers against Augereau's 9,000 men at Sant Llorenç de la Muga. Though Augereau's troop deployment was inadequate, his tactical skill helped win the battle and inflict heavy losses on the Spanish. Domingo Salvator Izquierdo advanced directly on the foundry with two brigades, but they were attacked by Mirabel's brigade in a gorge. When Augereau brought up reinforcements, Izquierdo's troops were routed. During the action, Mirabel was shot in the head and killed.

The French army mourned the loss of Mirabel, who historian Ramsay Weston Phipps described as "the best of the brigadiers". Mirabel's body was interred at the base of the Tree of Liberty at the Camp of Madeleine. On 22 August 1794, the French National Convention ordered Mirabel's name to be inscribed on the column of the Panthéon.
