= Battle of Mas Deu =

Battle

Coordinates: 42.6125°N 2.8092°E

- Part of the War of the Pyrenees
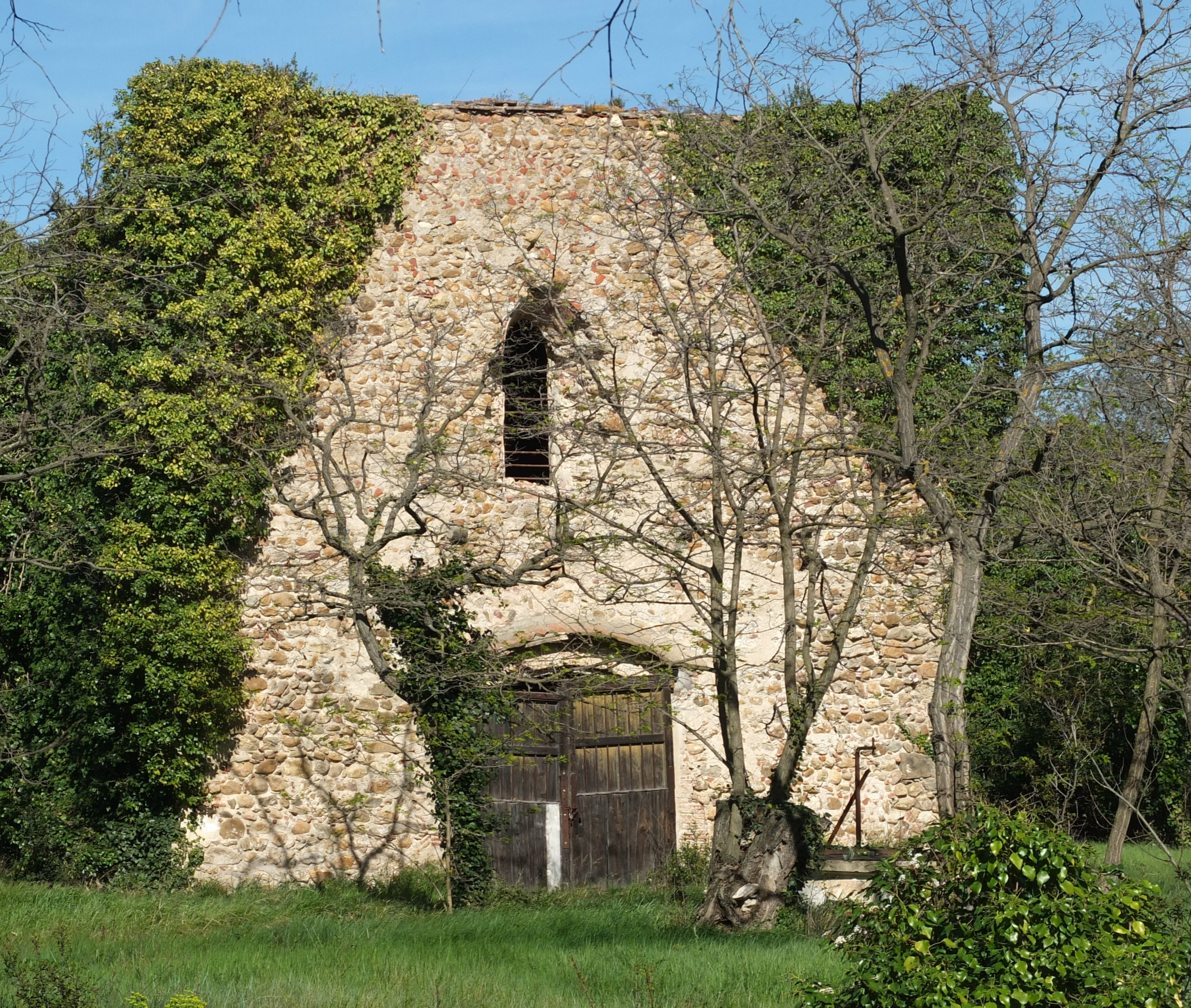
- Chapel at the Commandery of Mas Deu.
Date	17–19 May 1793
Location	Trouillas, Pyrénées-Orientales, France
Result	Spanish victory

Belligerents
France	Spain

Commanders and leaders
(France) Louis-Charles de Flers	(Spain) Antonio Ricardos

Strength
5,300	7,000–15,000

Casualties and losses
430	over 34

The Battle of Mas Deu or Battle of Mas d'Eu on 19 May 1793 saw the French Revolutionary Army of the Eastern Pyrenees under Louis-Charles de Flers fighting Bourbon Spain's army of Catalonia led by Antonio Ricardos.

The Spanish drove the outnumbered French soldiers out of their camp near Mas Deu and compelled them to retreat to Perpignan. The victory enabled the Spanish forces to lay siege to the Fort de Bellegarde, which dominated the best road through the Pyrenees from Barcelona into France. For the next month, Ricardos was preoccupied by the Siege of Bellegarde. Mas Deu is a former Knights Templar establishment east of the town of Trouillas in Pyrénées-Orientales. The action was fought during the War of the Pyrenees, part of the War of the First Coalition.

== Background ==
On April 17, 1793, Captain General Antonio Ricardos began the invasion of France when he descended on Saint-Laurent-de-Cerdans in the French Cerdagne with 4500 Spanish troops. The six battalions and eight grenadier companies led by Ricardos chased 400 French soldiers out of the village. The Spanish next headed for Céret on the Tech where they encountered one French regular battalion, 1000 volunteers, and four artillery pieces on 20 April. The clash ended disastrously for the 1800 French, who quickly took fright and ran away. Between 100 and 200 Frenchmen were casualties while another 200 drowned trying to swim across the Tech. Ricardos admitted losing only 17 men wounded in the skirmish. The Captain General left a force at Le Perthus to watch the garrison of the Fort de Bellegarde and keep it from interfering with his supply convoys.

On 14 May 1793, the French major general Louis-Charles de Flers took command of the Army of the Eastern Pyrenees. At about the same time, the French brigadier general, Luc Siméon Auguste Dagobert and Colonel Eustache Charles d'Aoust arrived with reinforcements from the Army of Italy. The French army was encamped on a hill 80 metres (262 ft) high near Mas Deu, which is located east of Trouillas. The position overlooked the Aspres plain and was protected by two deep-cut stream beds.

The Chateau of Mansus Déi was built by the Knights Templar in the 12th century and used as an administrative center for their extensive properties in Roussillon. In its heyday, the Templar establishment raised cattle, grapes, olives, and other crops on lands that stretched from Fenouillèdes in the north to Banyuls-sur-Mer in the south. The wealth and secrecy of the Templar Order made powerful enemies. Desiring to appropriate the order's riches, Philip IV of France, the Capetian king, demanded the arrest of all Templars in France in 1307. The knights were rounded up, put to the torture, burned at the stake in many cases. Their wealth became the property of the French king. Philip soon bent Pope Clement V to his purposes and the Templar Order was suppressed outside France as well. In 1312 all property of the order was given to the Knights Hospitaller.

In time, the name of the place changed to Mas Deu. In World War II, the German occupiers used the chateau as an ammunition dump. This was detonated in 1944, destroying the château, though some outbuildings survived to be used in the modern-day winery.

== Battle ==
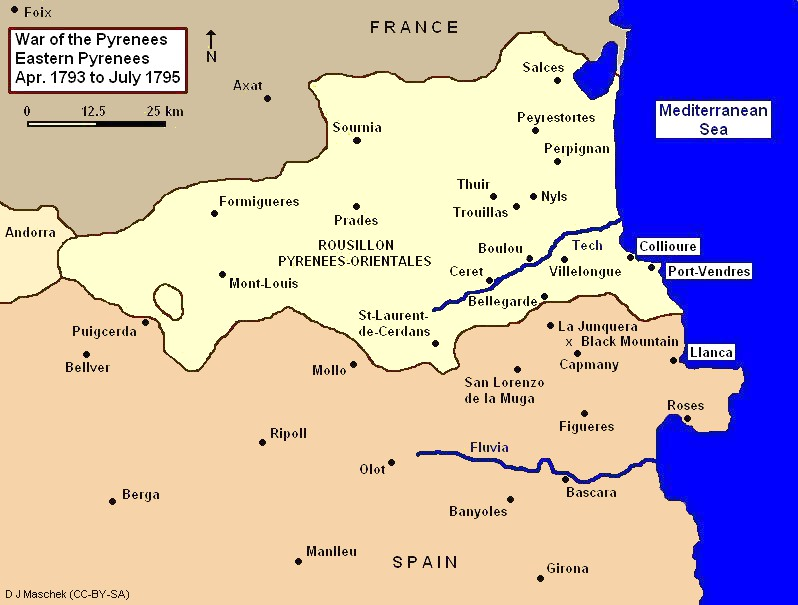
Map of the eastern theater of the War of the Pyrenees

On 16 May, Ricardos advanced from Céret with 12,000 infantry, 3,000 cavalry, 24 cannons, and six howitzers. Pedro Téllez-Girón, 9th Duke of Osuna commanded the 4860-strong Spanish right wing. His deputy was Pedro Mendinueta y Múzquiz and the force included four battalions of Royal Guards and one battalion each of the Mallorca Line Infantry and Volunteers of Catalonia Light Infantry Regiments, and Andalusian artillery. Ricardos accompanied the 2460-man center, which was led by Luis Firmín de Carvajal, Conde de la Unión. The 4680-strong Spanish left wing was led by Juan de Courten, Rafael Adorno, and José Crespo. The left was made up of three battalions of Walloon Guards, three companies from Tarragona, one battalion of an Irish regiment, one company each from Granada, Valencia, and Burgos, the Lusitania Cavalry Regiment, and artillery from New Castile.

De Flers' staff worked out a plan whereby the French artillery would bombard the Spanish positions, pinning their infantry in place. Then the French left wing would make a feint attack against the Spanish right. After this distraction, the reinforced right wing would deliver the main French assault. To implement this strategy, De Flers had only 5,000 foot soldiers, 300 horsemen, 15 cannons, and nine howitzers. Claude Souchon de Chameron led the 1,180 men of the left wing. This comprised Pierre François Sauret's 7th Battalion of Champagne, Pierre Banel's 7th Battalion of the Aude, Charles Dugua's artillery of Gard, and Paul Louis Gaultier de Kervéguen's 3rd Company of Lavaur. Dagobert's 2680-man right wing included Louis André Bon's 9th Battalion of Drome, Jean-Jacques Causse's 1st Battalion of Mont-Blanc Volunteers, Jacques Laurent Gilly's 2nd Battalion of Gard, Guillaume Mirabel's Herault Cavalry, and Antoine de Béthencourt's 180 cavalrymen. De Flers and Joseph Étienne Timoléon d'Hargenvilliers accompanied the 740 soldiers of the center.

Ricardos planned to maneuver Conde de la Unión's cavalry and then send Courten's Walloon Guards on a sweep around the village of Thuir to hit the flank of the Mas Deu camp. At 5:00 AM on the morning of 17 May, two Spanish batteries under the command of the Prince of Montforte opened fire. Each battery was composed of 12 4-pound guns and four 6-inch howitzers. The bombardment went on until 9:00 AM with the French infantry sheltering in the ravines near the camp. Apparently this ended the action for the day, with the French troops holding firm despite the prolonged artillery barrage.

On the 18th, Ricardos reorganized his center, placing José Urrutia y de las Casas and Juan Manuel de Cagigal in charge of the reserve cavalry. They were ordered to break through the French center where the troops of Amédée Willot and Kervéguen stood. Kervéguen's counterattack against Cagigal's horsemen failed and Dugua's guns had to cover the withdrawal of Kervéguen's soldiers. Evening found the French line still intact but stretched by trying to hold back their adversaries' superior numbers. In the night, a rumor swept through the French camp that the Spanish were massacring the outposts. At 3:00 AM firing broke out between the pickets of both sides. Numbers of French troops panicked and fled back to Perpignan. That night, Bonaventure Benet, a priest who helped bury the French dead, spied out the location of each French unit and sent this information to Spanish headquarters.

On 19 May, Sauret was wounded in the leg and his battalion lost heart and retreated. Exploiting this withdrawal, Ricardos ordered Osuna to break into the camp supported by the fire of 14 cannons. To counter Osuna's attack, Dagobert sent help from the right flank. The Bezieres Volunteer Battalion and the 2nd Battalion of Haute-Garonne counterattacked but were repulsed by the Spanish soldiers' disciplined ranks. The French began to abandon their camp and artillery. While his horsemen covered the retreat, Mirabel was wounded in the leg by an exploding howitzer shell. De Flers personally rallied one battalion, but it was driven off by the Spanish cavalry.

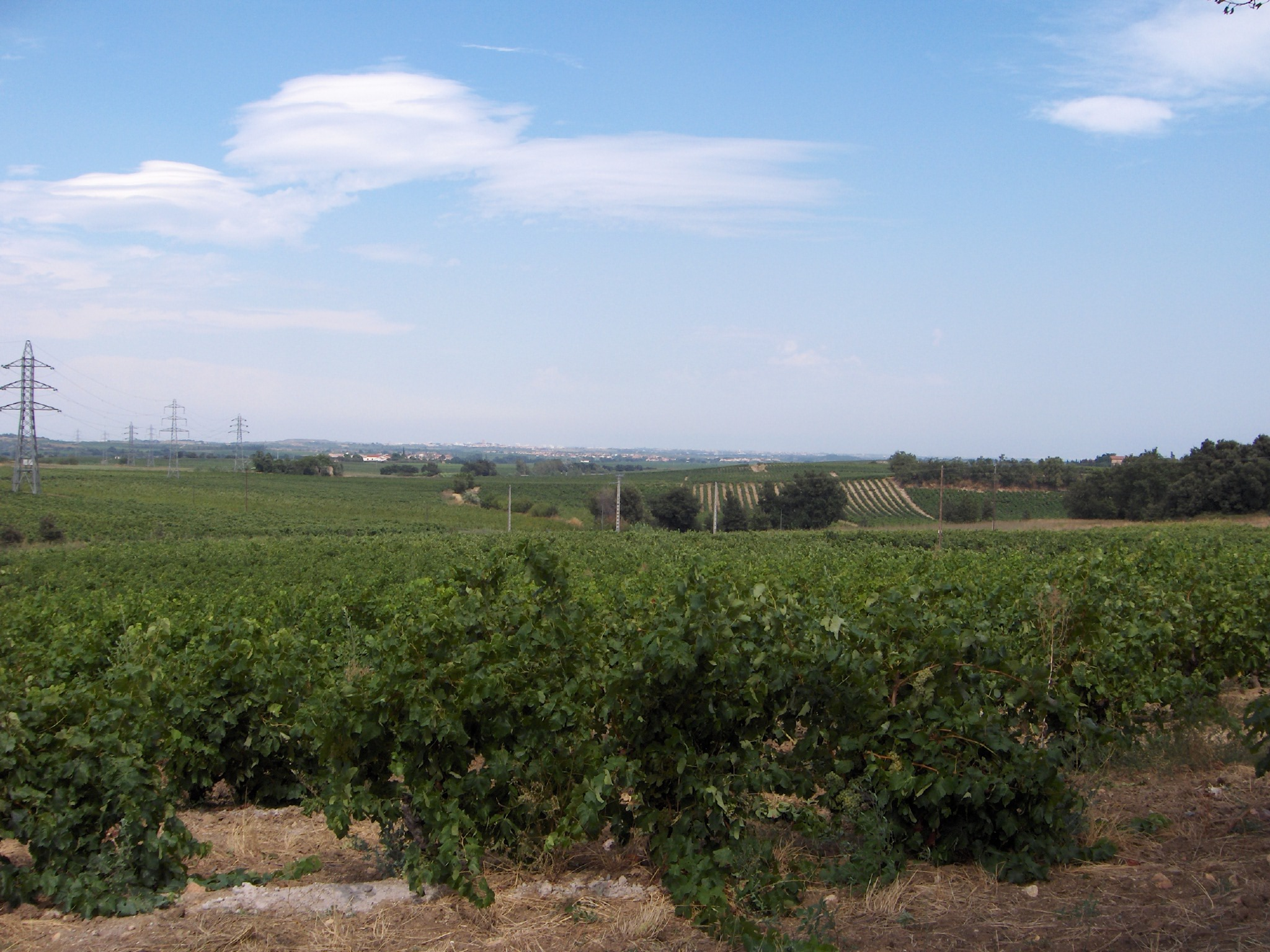
Photo shows the country near Mas Deu.

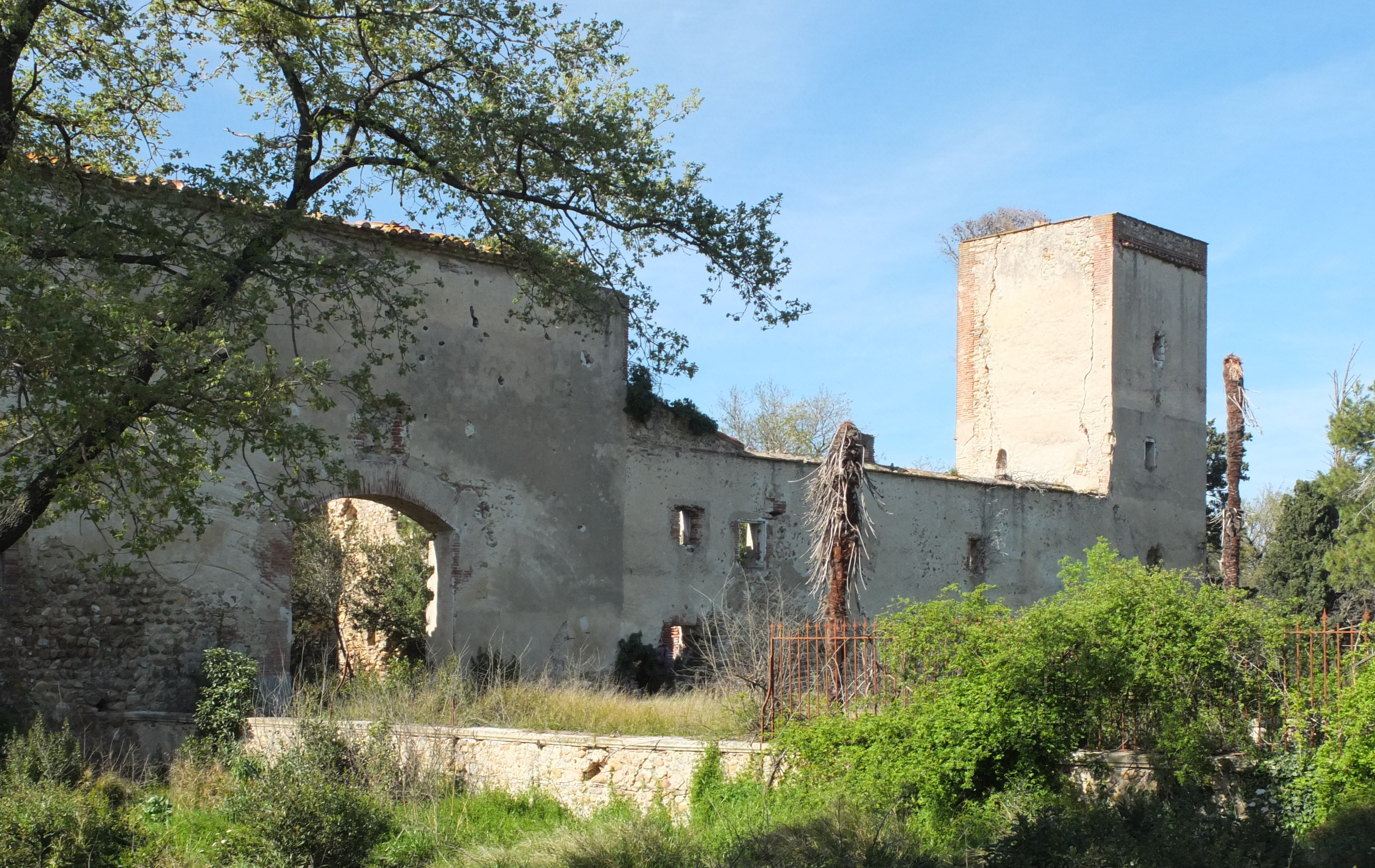
Ruin of the Commanderie du Mas Deu as it looks today.

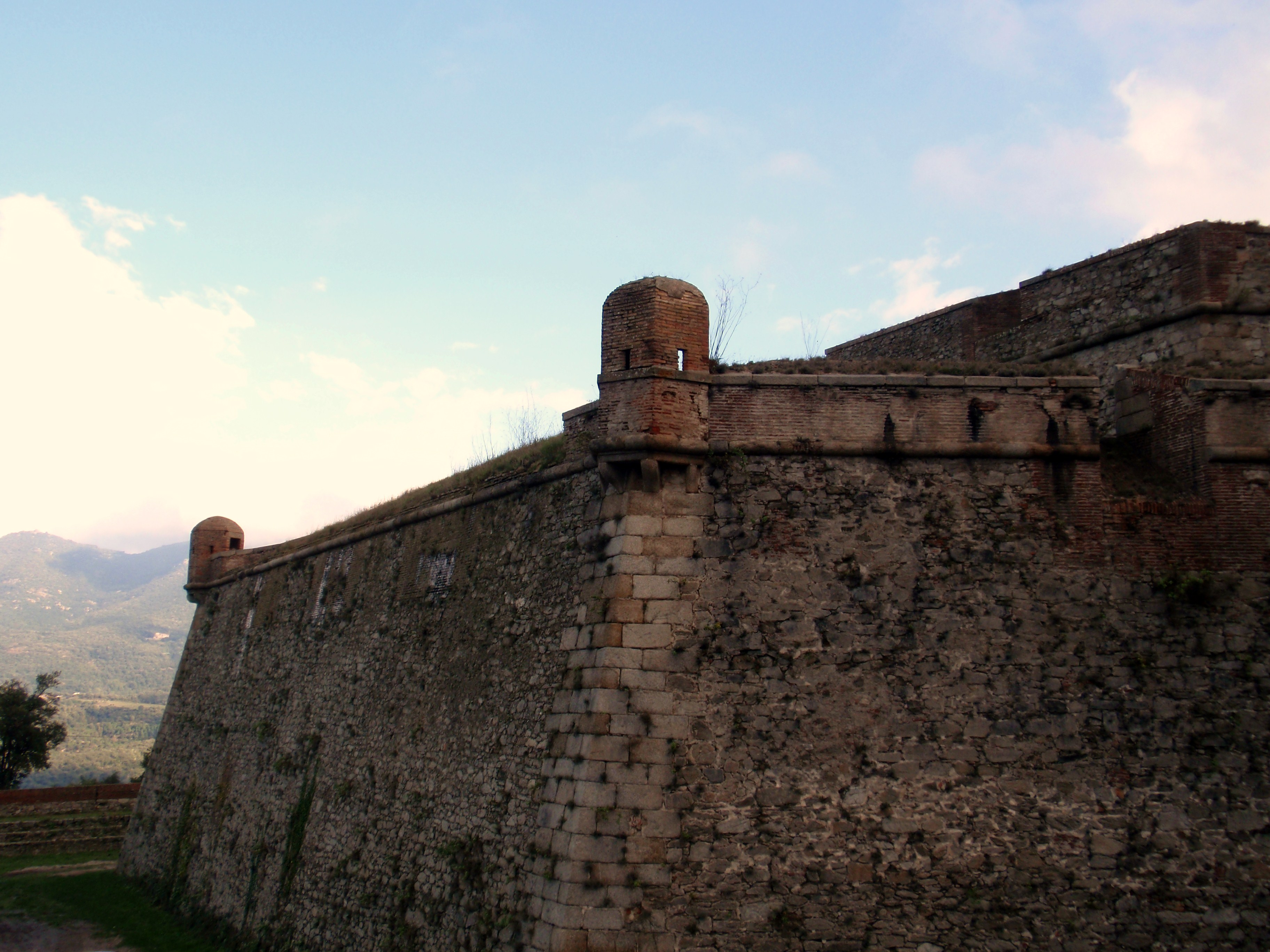
Fort de Bellegarde occupied the Spanish army for a month after the battle.

== Results ==
The next day, Perpignan was crowded with demoralized soldiers and frightened refugees. The local political leaders appropriated churches, convents, and the homes of émigrés to house the refugees. De Flers issued an address, "Soldiers, great cowardice has been committed. Some of the defenders of liberty have fled the satellites of despotism..." One volunteer battalion declared that it would not fight the Spanish and had to be disbanded. Historian Digby Smith credited the Spanish army with only 7,000 men in six line battalions, eight grenadier companies, and 30 provincial militia companies. He listed French casualties as 150 killed and 280 wounded, with three 6-pound cannons and six ammunition wagons becoming prizes of the Spanish. The Spanish admitted losing 34 killed but did not list the number of wounded. Rather than follow up his badly shaken opponents, Ricardos chose to turn back and invest the Fort de Bellegarde. This fortress dominated the main road through the Pyrenees at the Col du Perthus.

The Siege of Bellegarde began on 23 May and lasted until 24 June when Colonel Boisbrulé surrendered the 1,450 surviving members of the garrison. Another 30 men had been killed and 56 wounded. The fortress was armed with 41 cannons and seven mortars. Ricardos maintained 6,000 Spanish troops and 34 guns in the siege lines. While the main siege went on, the Spanish were also obliged to reduce two outworks, Fort les Bains and Fort de la Garde. These places surrendered on 3 and 5 June, respectively. De Flers tried to send a resupply convoy into Bellegarde on 29 May, but the effort failed when the 3,350-man escort was driven off.

On 24 May, de Flers began construction of the Camp de l'Union. This was laid out under the walls of Perpignan between the village of Cabestany on the east to the mill of Orles on the west. As a result of the battle, Dagobert was elevated in rank to divisional general, while Sauret was promoted to colonel. On the Spanish side, Osuna proved to be a difficult subordinate and was transferred to the Army of Navarre in the western Pyrenees in October.
