= Army of the Eastern Pyrenees =

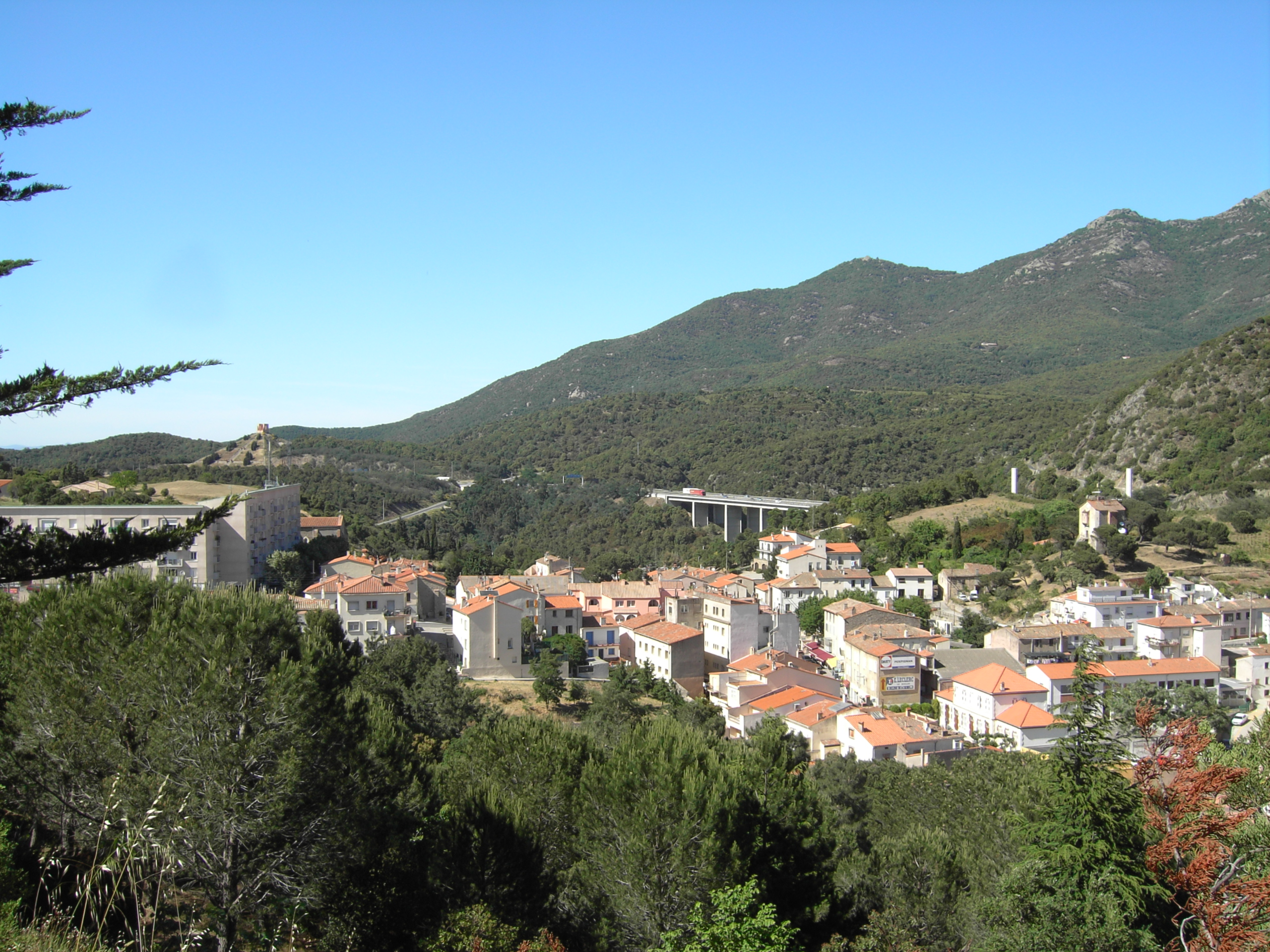
- View from Fort de Bellegarde in the Pyrenees. Spanish territory is in the right foreground; the rest belongs to France. During the fighting, the French first lost, then regained Bellegarde.
- Active: 30 April 1793 – 12 October 1795
- Country: Republican France
- Type: Army
- Role: Operations in the eastern Pyrenees
- Engagements: War of the Pyrenees

Commanders
- Notable commanders: Louis-Charles de Flers; Eustache Charles d'Aoust; Jacques Dugommier; Dominique Pérignon; Barthélemy Schérer

The Army of the Eastern Pyrenees (Armée des Pyrénées Orientales) was one of the French Revolutionary armies. It fought against the Kingdom of Spain in Roussillon, the Cerdanya and Catalonia during the War of the Pyrenees. This army and the Army of the Western Pyrenees were formed by splitting the original Army of the Pyrenees at the end of April 1793 soon after the war started. Shortly after the Peace of Basel on 22 July 1795, the fighting ended and the army was dissolved on 12 October that same year. Many of its units and generals were transferred to join the Army of Italy and fought under Napoleon Bonaparte in 1796.

In the first dismal months of fighting, the Army of the Eastern Pyrenees was beaten at Mas Deu and Bellegarde and forced back under the walls of Perpignan. Then the French repelled two Spanish attacks at Perpignan and Peyrestortes. Though the army was defeated again at Truillas and in other actions, the Spanish invaders withdrew to the Tech River in late 1793. Throughout the year the representatives on mission had enormous powers and used them to interfere with the military effort and to arrest officers that they deemed unpatriotic or unsuccessful. In 1794, the army's fortunes improved when Jacques François Dugommier took command. The army drove the Spanish army from France soil at Boulou and recaptured the Fort de Bellegarde and Collioure. After establishing itself on Spanish territory, the army won a decisive victory at the Battle of the Black Mountain in November during which Dugommier was killed. His replacement, Dominique Catherine de Pérignon soon captured the Sant Ferran fortress and the port of Roses. After these events the front became static and the last notable action was a Spanish victory at Bascara in June.

The war took a severe toll on the commanders of the Army of the Eastern Pyrenees. Aside from Dugommier's death in battle, three were executed by the guillotine and another died of disease. Five officers from the army later became Marshals of France under Napoleon. These were Pérignon, Pierre Augereau, Claude Perrin Victor, Jean Lannes and Jean-Baptiste Bessières.

== Formation ==
The executions of King Louis XVI and Queen Marie Antoinette outraged the ancient monarchies of Europe. Even so, it was the French First Republic that declared war on its ancient ally the Kingdom of Spain on 7 March 1793. Spain joined the War of the First Coalition and invaded Roussillon on 17 April 1793. The Army of the Pyrenees was formed on 1 October 1792 and commanded by Joseph Marie Servan de Gerbey. On 30 April 1793, the army was divided into two separate armies. The Army of the Eastern Pyrenees was responsible for all territory between the Rhône and the upper Garonne Rivers while the Army of the Western Pyrenees defended territory between the upper Garonne and the Gironde estuary. At the start of the War of the Pyrenees, Servan went to Bayonne in the west, assigning Mathieu Henri Marchant de La Houlière to take charge at Perpignan in the east.

== History ==
=== 1793: Invasion and defeats ===
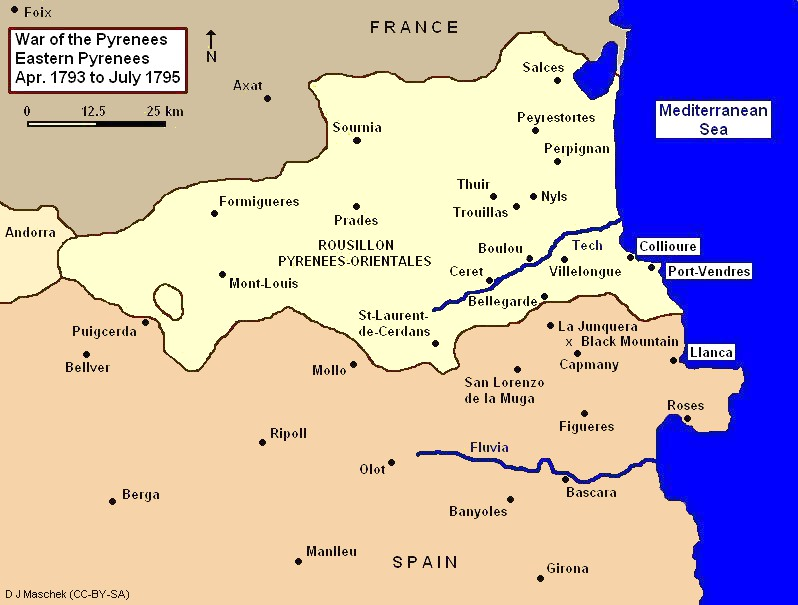
War of the Pyrenees, Eastern Pyrenees

At first the war went badly for France. A Spanish column of 4,500 soldiers under Captain General Antonio Ricardos invaded France on 17 April 1793, driving a French garrison from the town of Saint-Laurent-de-Cerdans. On 20 April, Ricardos routed 1,800 unsteady French soldiers from Céret and crossed the Tech River. The representatives on mission blamed La Houlière for the fiasco and removed him from command. The distraught La Houlière put a gun to his head and killed himself on 18 June 1793. The old soldier was 76 years old. General of Brigade Claude Souchon de Chameron was appointed to lead the local forces on 25 April and he took interim command of the newly created army from 1 to 13 May. Chameron was arrested later and sent to the guillotine on 12 April 1794.

The Army of the Eastern Pyrenees was in the grip of its representatives on mission, "to an extent unknown elsewhere", according to historian Ramsay Weston Phipps. This may have been because of the lack of officers from the regular army establishment and because the representatives were local men who wanted to promote their personal friends. Their arrogance was almost beyond belief. Raymond Gaston boasted, "I know neither Generals nor special powers. As to the Minister, he is like a dog on a race course. I alone should command here, and I shall be obeyed." His colleague Claude Dominique Côme Fabre described the army commanders-in-chief as "useless" and wished the office to be abolished. Joseph Guiter asserted, "What good are Generals? The women of our faubourgs know as much as they do." Fabre demanded and got 100 Jacobins to be sent from Paris to be distributed within the army as "Civic Apostles" where they stirred up trouble among the enlisted men.

On 14 May 1793, General of Division Louis-Charles de Flers took command of the army which numbered 12,000 men of whom only 9,000 were armed. Five days later, Ricardos with 15,000 troops attacked and beat 5,000 French soldiers at the Battle of Mas Deu. After the action, the defeated troops were seized by a sudden panic and stampeded back to Perpignan in utter confusion. Meanwhile, Ricardos turned back to reduce the Fort de Bellegarde. Flers used the time to build the fortified Camp de la Union under the walls of Perpignan where his drilled his 12,000 men. The Siege of Bellegarde occupied the invaders from 23 May until the place fell on 24 June. With his supply line to Spain secure, Ricardos moved against the Camp de la Union on 17 July. He intended to unnerve the French by bombarding them with 100 field pieces. In the event, the French artillery under the direction of Jean Fabre de La Martillière outdueled the Spanish guns and Ricardos withdrew. The Battle of Perpignan involved 12,000 French and 15,000 Spanish troops. Despite his victory, Flers' reputation was damaged by his former association with Charles François Dumouriez who had defected to the enemy. At this time the Spanish captured the town of Villefranche-de-Conflent west of Perpignan. On 7 August the representatives on mission removed Flers for the crime of "having lost the confidence of the citizen-soldiers". He was sent to Paris where he was guillotined on 22 July 1794.

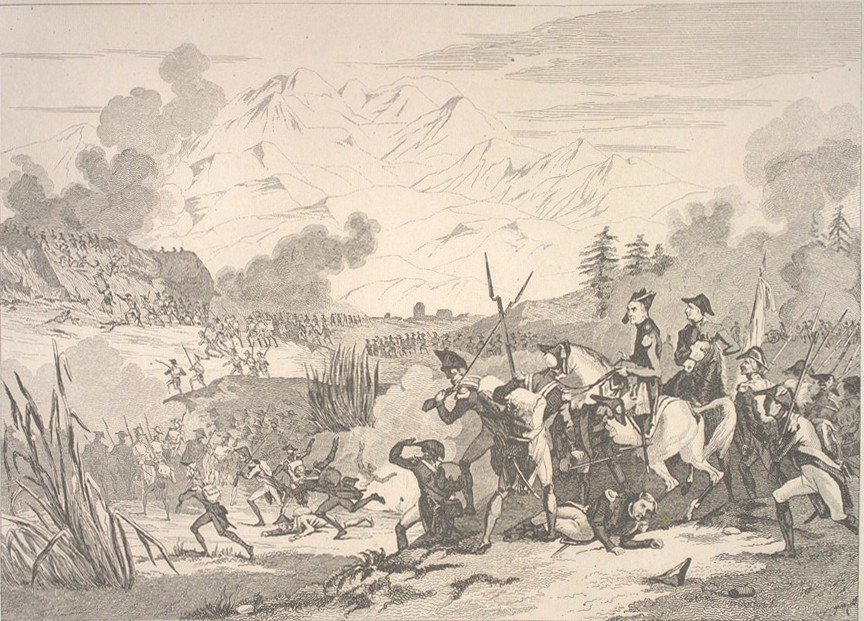
The Battle of Truillas was fought on 22 September 1793.

On 7 August 1793 General of Division Hilarion Paul Puget de Barbantane accepted the army command from the representatives on mission, assuring them that he wanted to "wash out his original sin" of being an aristocrat. At the same time, General of Division Luc Siméon Auguste Dagobert was sent inland with 3,000 reinforcements to the Cerdagne. Dagobert with 6,500 soldiers defeated Manuel la Peña at Puigcerdà on 28 August. Meanwhile, Ricardos pursued a strategy of surrounding Perpignan by fortified camps. He built camps at Argelès-sur-Mer to the southeast, Ponteilla to the southwest, Olette to the west and Peyrestortes to the northwest. Instead of seeing an opportunity to strike at the dispersed Spanish army, Barbantane was seized with fright. Leaving General of Division Eustache Charles d'Aoust in charge of Perpignan, Barbantane retreated with one division to Salses-le-Château, then the terrified man went to Narbonne to look for reinforcements. Finally, Barbantane wrote his resignation which was accepted. He was of course arrested, but amazingly he avoided the guillotine. Napoleon later described him as "useless". In the crisis, the government sent for General of Division Louis Marie Turreau to lead the army. To fill the command vacuum, the representatives on mission called for the return of Dagobert from the Cerdagne, appointed d'Aoust as temporary commander and named General of Brigade Jacques Gilles Henri Goguet, a former doctor, to lead the division at Salses. In the Battle of Peyrestortes on 17 September, d'Aoust with 8,000 troops defeated Lieutenant General Juan de Courten's 6,000 men. Since Spanish had occupied Vernet on the outskirts of Perpignan, d'Aoust attacked and recaptured this position in the morning. In the evening d'Aoust, Goguet and Representative Joseph Cassanyes improvised a successful assault on the camp at Peyrestortes, driving the Spanish forces south of the Têt River and capturing 500 men, 43 guns and seven colors. The cautious Ricardos never budged while his camps were being overrun and the French soon recovered Villefranche-de-Conflent as well.

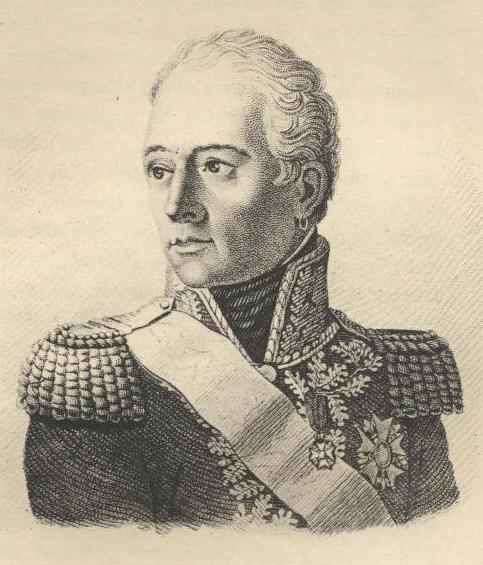
Louis Marie Turreau

Dagobert returned to Perpignan on 19 September. He led his 22,000-man army to attack Ricardos' 17,000 Spanish troops on 22 September in the Battle of Truillas. The Spanish were victorious and lost 2,000 killed and wounded while claiming to have inflicted 3,000 killed and wounded on the French as well as capturing 1,500 men and 10 guns. Even though he had won, Ricardos retreated to Le Boulou on the Tech because he feared getting cut off from Spain. But when the Spanish commander recommended a retreat into Spanish territory, his government insisted that he hold his position. About this time the Spanish army was reinforced by 6,000 Portuguese under Lieutenant General John Forbes. Dagobert tried to outflank the Spanish by a move through Banyuls-dels-Aspres but the representatives forbade this. Enraged by this meddling, Dagobert resigned the army command on 29 September and resumed leadership of the Cerdagne Division. The representatives reappointed d'Aoust as army commander and he launched a number of futile attacks on the Spanish army in the fall. There was a battle at Le Boulou on 3 October where Ricardos lost 300 killed and wounded out of 15,000 troops while d'Aoust's army lost 400 killed and 800 wounded out of 16,000. Turreau arrived to take command on 11 October and found that the representatives were not pleased with his coming. He saw the degree to which the representatives had taken control of the army and used a bureaucratic oversight by the War Ministry as an excuse to stay on the sidelines. Meanwhile, he let d'Aoust conduct operations while sending letters to the War Minister complaining about d'Aoust and the representatives.

On 17 November Dagobert was arrested for disagreeing with the representatives. He was eventually acquitted and returned to his division where he died on 18 April 1794. Meanwhile, on 3 November the government replaced Turreau with François Amédée Doppet, another ex-doctor. Not wanting to wait for Turreau's successor, the representatives reappointed d'Aoust to command from 22 to 27 November. Doppet came to take command on 28 November but was practically ignored by the representatives on mission. On 7 December, d'Aoust with 10,000 men was defeated at Villelongue-dels-Monts by Ricardos with 8,000 Spanish and Portuguese troops. The Allies lost only 56 casualties while inflicting losses of 340 killed and wounded, 312 missing, 26 guns, two colors and 2,000 muskets on the French. Doppet decided to pull back to Perpignan for the winter under cover of a spoiling attack on Villelongue. D'Aoust led the attack on 18 December which overran the Portuguese camp and slaughtered its garrison. Doppet soon came down with illness and spent the next two and a half months in bed recovering. D'Aoust was finally in full command just in time to be blamed for a disaster. In the Battle of Collioure, a Spanish corps commanded by Lieutenant General Gregorio García de la Cuesta drove the French out of Collioure and Port-Vendres on 20 December, inflicting 4,000 casualties on the French. Fort Saint-Elme was betrayed to the Spanish by its traitorous commander. D'Aoust ordered a retreat on the 21st but the Spanish harassed it severely. Finally, the French fought their way back to the safety of Perpignan but their total losses in the debacle were 7,700 men and 23 guns. The government singled out the Army of the Eastern Pyrenees for disapproval despite the fact that its representatives were in large part responsible for the defeats. D'Aoust was arrested and the representatives on mission were recalled, except Fabre who was killed at Collioure. New representatives Édouard Jean Baptiste Milhaud and Pierre-Amable de Soubrany celebrated their arrival by purging the army of both good and bad army officers. However, they subsequently did a better job of keeping the army supplied while letting the army officers do their work. D'Aoust fell victim to the guillotine on 2 July 1794.

=== 1794: French victories ===
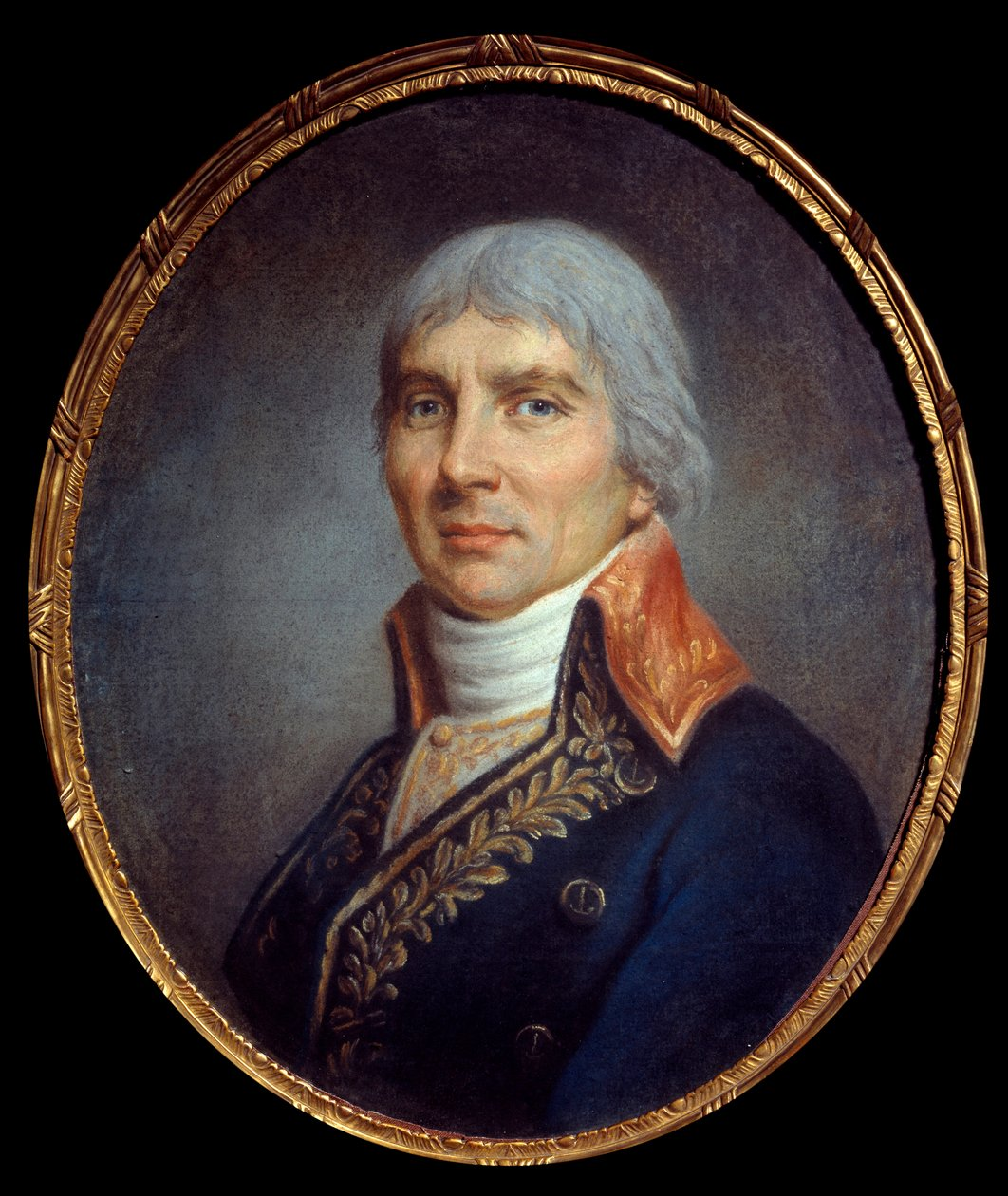
Jacques Dugommier

On 16 January 1794, the French government appointed General of Division Jacques François Dugommier to lead the army. The victor of the Siege of Toulon began a thorough reorganization of the ill-used Army of the Eastern Pyrenees. Dugommier established supply depots, hospitals, and arsenals, and constructed roads. The army's reorganization and resupply was necessary because seven-eighths of the infantry's muskets had no bayonets, the artillery was badly armed, the cavalry and wagon train's horses were starving because of a lack of forage, the food supply was intermittent and the men's uniforms were in poor condition. After receiving reinforcements from the Toulon army, Dugommier counted a field army 28,000 strong, backed by 20,000 garrison troops and 9,000 untrained volunteers. He formed his troops into three infantry divisions under Generals of Division Dominique Catherine de Pérignon, Pierre Augereau, and Pierre François Sauret. He placed General of Division André de La Barre in charge of his 2,500 cavalry troopers. Both Pérignon and Augereau, as well their subordinates General of Brigade Claude Perrin Victor and Colonel Jean Lannes, later became Marshals of France under the First French Empire.

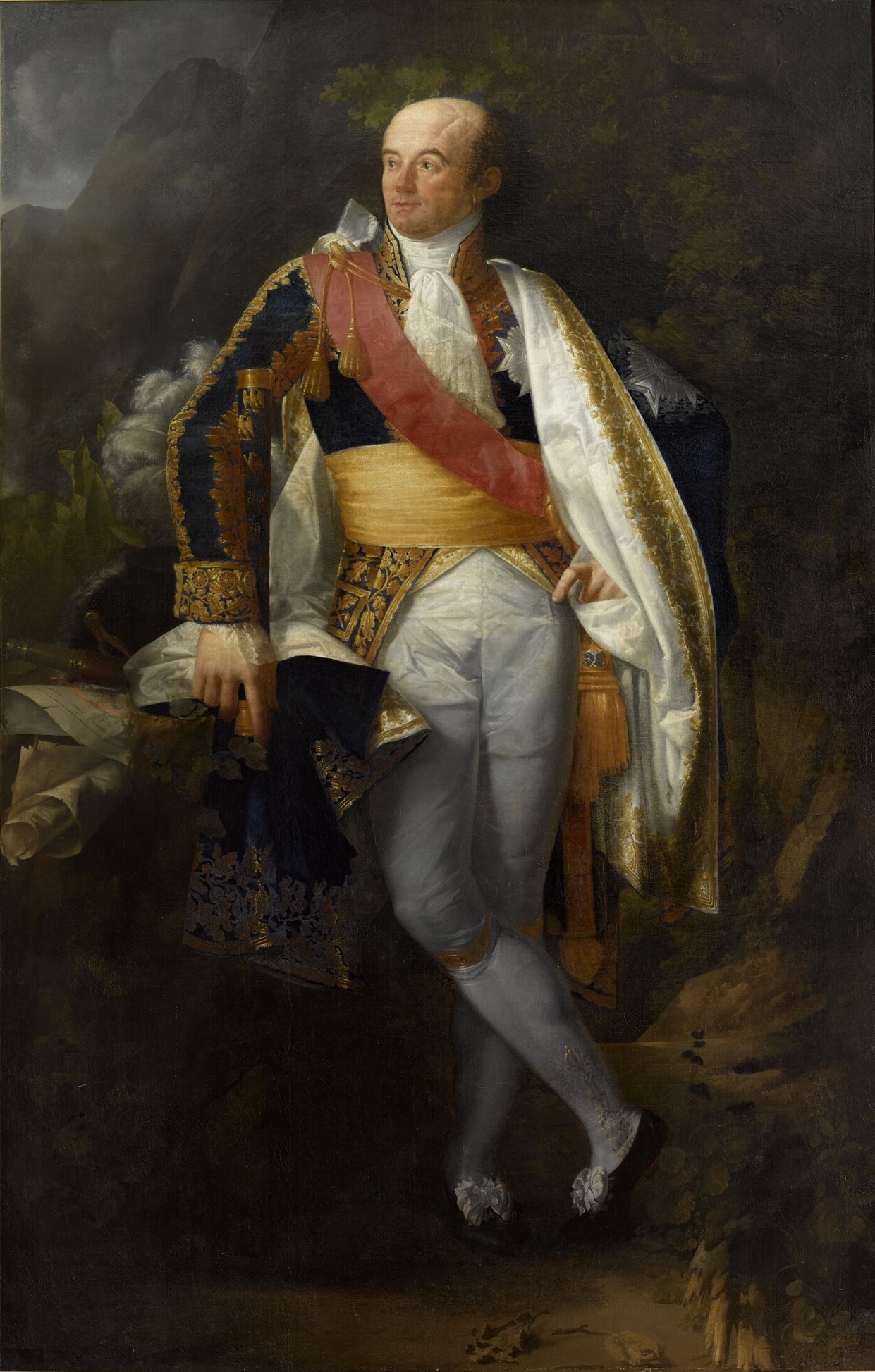
Dominique Pérignon

In Madrid for a conference, Ricardos died on 13 March 1794 supposedly from poison intended for Manuel Godoy, Prince of the Peace. His successor, Lieutenant General Alejandro O'Reilly died on 23 March of a stomach ailment while traveling to take command. Lieutenant General Luis Firmin de Carvajal, Conde de la Union was given command of the Allied army. The Battle of Boulou from 30 April to 1 May 1794 was a French victory. The Spanish suffered 2,000 killed and wounded while losing 1,500 prisoners, 140 artillery pieces and their entire wagon train. On 29 April Dugommier's feint attack on the Spanish left led de la Union to reinforce that wing. The next day Pérignon's division launched the main attack through a gap in the Spanish right-center. Pérignon gained the summits behind the Spanish defenses and on 1 May the entire position collapsed. On 26 May, Sauret and La Barre recaptured Collioure after a 25-day siege. By the terms of capitulation, the 7,000-man Spanish garrison was to be exchanged for an equal number of French prisoners, neither side being able to employ the exchanged troops against the other side. But after the return of the Spanish prisoners, de la Union reneged on the agreement, claiming that it was void without his consent. Besides, he argued, the repatriated Spanish troops could not serve against France while the repatriated French could fight against other enemies. A furious Dugommier now asked his government to declare a "war to the death" and the National Convention voted that Spanish prisoners were to be executed. For a while, some units carried out the order very thoroughly, but the Spanish refused to murder French prisoners in retaliation.

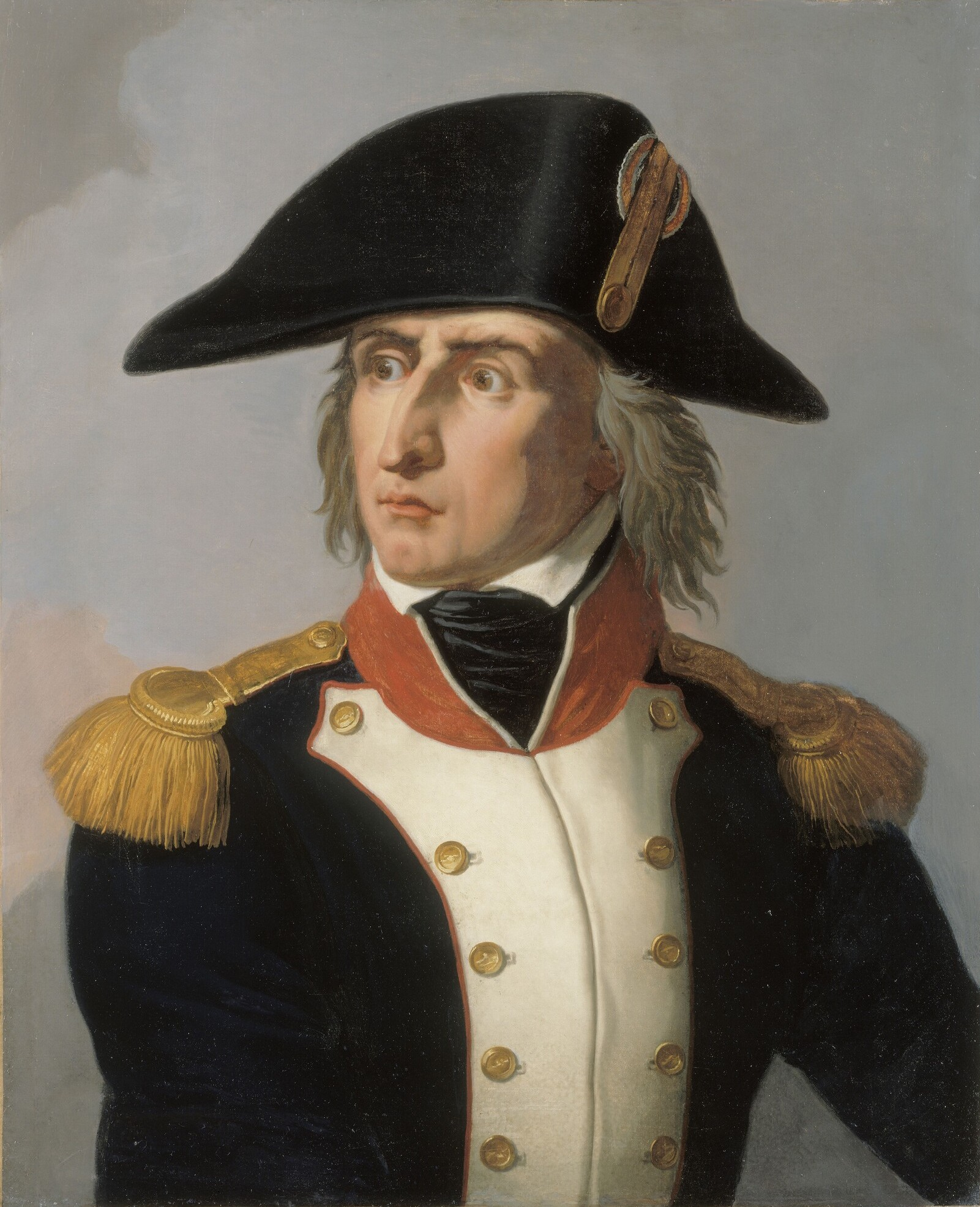
Pierre Augereau

On 6 May, Augereau's division drove two Spanish line battalions and about 1,000 miquelets from Sant Llorenç de la Muga (San Lorenzo de la Muga), seizing the cannon foundry there. Dugommier disapproved of this move while Pérignon besieged Bellegarde, but he allowed Augereau stay in this exposed position. On 19 May de la Union tried to surround Augereau's 6,000 troops with 15,000 men in seven columns. Though the encircling columns reached their positions behind the French, it did not matter. Augereau's men smashed the Spanish columns in their front with heavy losses and de la Union's attack failed. Pérignon fought the Spanish at La Junquera on 7 June, in an action that saw the death of La Barre. General of Brigade Charles Dugua replaced him as head of the cavalry. Doppet, who took command of the 12,886-strong Cerdagne Division after Dagobert died, raided Ripoll on 11 June. Doppet took too long and, when de la Union moved against him, Augereau had to send a column under General of Brigade Louis Lemoine to help. Doppet got away but Lemoine was nearly trapped, having to be rescued by 1,200 men under Lannes. During this operation Cuesta probed the French Cerdagne but was repulsed. On 15 September, General of Division Étienne Charlet took command of the Cerdagne Division from Doppet.

De la Union's attempt to relieve Bellegarde failed at the Battle of San-Lorenzo de la Muga on 13 August. The French sustained 800 casualties including General of Brigade Guillaume Mirabel killed. Augereau led 9,000 men on the right, Pérignon had 16,000 troops in the center while Sauret commanded 9,000 on the left. The Spanish attacked with 45,000 troops including 4,000 cavalry. De la Union tried to overwhelm Augereau with 22,000 men but made the same mistake as in the May attack by attacking in six columns. This time the struggle lasted 16 hours in which Augereau was nearly driven from the field but held it at the end. The French took only 140 prisoners and killed 1,336 of their enemies. Sauret had repelled an attack on his wing while Victor's brigade had repulsed a seaborne assault on the coast. At last, Dugommier ordered Augereau to abandon the cannon foundry and move toward the center. Bellegarde proved to be a tough nut to crack and its 1,000 surviving defenders only capitulated on 17 September. The French won a decisive victory at the Battle of the Black Mountain fought from 17 to 20 November. Uniquely, both army commanders Dugommier and de la Union were killed in action. The French had 36,700 troops to oppose 46,000 entrenched Spanish. Augereau began the attack at dawn on the 17th and began rolling up the Spanish left. After Dugommier was killed by a Spanish shell that morning, Pérignon took command of the army and called off the attack for two days. General of Division Jean Baptiste Beaufort de Thorigny took command of the center. On the 20th, Augereau's assault recommenced and captured the key Roure redoubt. De la Union led his cavalry in a countercharge and was later found dead with two bullet wounds. Taking few prisoners, the French massacred 8,000 of their foes as they overran all the defensive works on the left and center. The undefeated Spanish right wing under Lieutenant General Juan Miguel de Vives y Feliu was also compelled to retreat. The French lost about 3,000 killed and wounded. Pérignon quickly seized Figueres and bluffed the powerful Sant Ferran fortress into surrendering on 28 November with 9,000 Spanish prisoners and 171 guns.

=== 1795: War ends ===
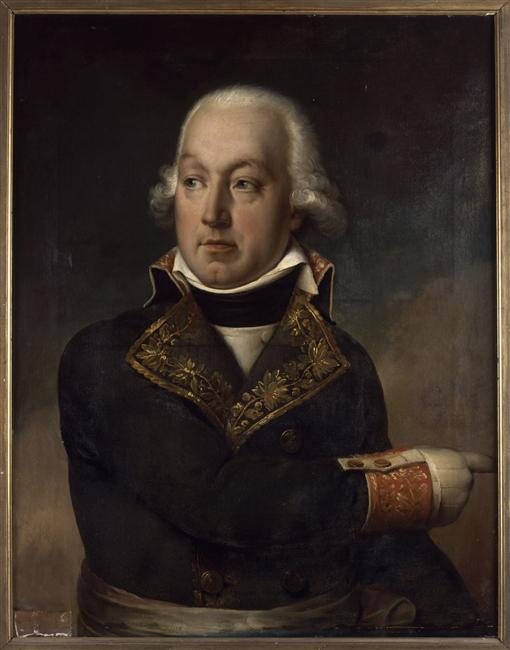
Barthélemy Schérer

The Siege of Roses lasted from 21 November until 3 February 1795 when the Spanish fleet evacuated the garrison by sea. The operation was conducted by Sauret and 13,261 men while the city was defended by Lieutenant General Domingo Izquierdo and 4,000 troops. French losses were not reported while the Spanish lost 113 killed, 470 wounded, 1,160 sick and 300 captured. The last group of men were caught because Victor was alert and drove off the last convoy of boats. Antoine-François Andréossy performed notable service as a military engineer. The mid-winter siege led to heavy desertion among the newly conscripted soldiers. On 1 March Pérignon probed the Spanish defenses on the Fluvià River but was driven back. He asked the government for reinforcements of 10,000 foot and 2,000 horse with which he proposed to drive Lieutenant General José de Urrutia y de las Casas back into Girona.

The government's response was to replace Pérignon with General of Division Barthélemy Louis Joseph Schérer on 3 March. They were aware of the rivalry between Pérignon and Augereau and preferred someone from another army to assume army command. Pérignon gave way with good grace, but was not successful in his subsequent operations. Schérer did not take up his new command until 31 May. The French government determined that the army would stand on the defensive without reinforcements, while the Army of the Western Pyrenees conducted the main offensive. On 15 June Scherer began a movement for the purpose of foraging. Thinking that the French were attacking, Urrutia assaulted the French center and defeated it at the Battle of Bascara. Augereau's division intervened and forced back the victorious Spanish. Unwisely, Schérer then began building a line of defenses in marshy ground which caused hundreds of his troops to sicken with fever. With a column of between 7,000 and 9,000 men, Cuesta wiped out the French garrisons at Puigcerdà and Bellver de Cerdanya in late July. These actions occurred after the Peace of Basel on 22 July. The news of the peace arrived on 30 July to the relief of the French and the annoyance of the Spanish, who finally had hopes of success.

On 21 July 1795 the Army of the Eastern Pyrenees numbered 36,491 men. After the peace treaty, about 12,000 soldiers in 51 weak battalions were left in the south. Another 15,000 troops in 53 battalions were transferred to the Army of Italy along with Schérer, who was named to command that army on 31 August. Many of the volunteers took the opportunity of deserting when they marched through their own communities. In addition to Pérignon, Augereau, Victor and Lannes, Captain Jean-Baptiste Bessières of the cavalry also became a marshal under Napoleon. Schérer's chief of staff General of Division Charles Pierre de Lamer particularly praised Lannes as a talented leader. Other officers of the army who had distinguished military careers were Louis André Bon, Bertrand Clausel, Joseph Marie Dessaix, Dugua, Jean Joseph Guieu, Lemoine, Sauret and Jean-Antoine Verdier. The army was dissolved on 12 October 1795 at which time Lamer was its commander.

== Commanders ==
The leaders of the Army of the Eastern Pyrenees and their dates of command are listed as follows.

- General of Brigade Claude Souchon de Chameron, 1–13 May 1793
- General of Division Louis-Charles de Flers, 14 May–6 August 1793
- General of Division Hilarion Paul Puget de Barbantane, 7 August–11 September 1793
- After Barbantane's desertion, the army was briefly split into independent divisions, 12–18 September 1793
  - General of Division Luc Siméon Auguste Dagobert
  - General of Division Eustache Charles d'Aoust
  - General of Brigade Jacques Gilles Henri Goguet
- General of Division Dagobert, 18–28 September 1793
- General of Division d'Aoust, 29 September–11 October 1793
- General of Division Louis Marie Turreau, 12 October–21 November 1793
- General of Division d'Aoust, 22–27 November 1793
- General of Division François Amédée Doppet, 28 November–20 December 1793
- General of Division d'Aoust, 21 December 1793 – 15 January 1794
- General of Division Jacques François Dugommier, 16 January–17 November 1794 †
- General of Division Dominique Catherine de Pérignon, 17 November 1794 – 29 May 1795
- General of Division Barthélemy Louis Joseph Schérer, 30 May–15 September 1795
- General of Division Charles Pierre de Lamer, 16 September–12 October 1795

Source: Clerget, Charles (1905). Tableaux des armées françaises pendant les guerres de la Révolution. Paris: Librarie Militaire R. Chapelot et Cie.
