= Landing Craft (Gun) Tower =

Catamaran

Class overview
- Name: Landing Craft (Gun) Tower
- Builders: Derman Long & Sir Alexander Gibb
- Operators: Royal Navy
- Planned: Several
- Completed: One, LC(G)T1
- Active: None

General characteristics
- Class & type: Landing Craft (Gun) Tower
- Length: 130 ft (40 m)
- Beam: 13 ft (4.0 m)
- Height: 50 ft (15 m) from keel to top of structure; 12.5 ft (3.8 m) from keel to main deck
- Draught: Variable
- Installed power: circa 300 bhp (220 kW)
- Propulsion: 2 x shaft diesel engines, one to each hull, Leyland bus pattern
- Complement: 12
- Armament: 2 × 6-inch howitzer; 4 × 20mm guns

Landing Craft (Gun) Tower, abbreviated as LC(G)T, also known as the Normandy Bombardment Tower, was a unique catamaran built in 1943. It was designed to act as a semi-mobile gun tower which could be used to out-gun any German beach defences during the Allied invasion of Normandy in 1944. It is described in some sources as a "semi-submersible austerity inshore monitor".

Several were originally planned, but only one was built as the design had been superseded by the various other support craft in production, such as the Landing Craft Tank (Rocket).

HMS LC(G)T 1 was never used, and was sold post-war to a company in Hong Kong, who used it as a lifting craft.
