= Siege of Bellegarde (1793) =

1793 siege during the War of the First Coalition

- Part of the War of the Pyrenees
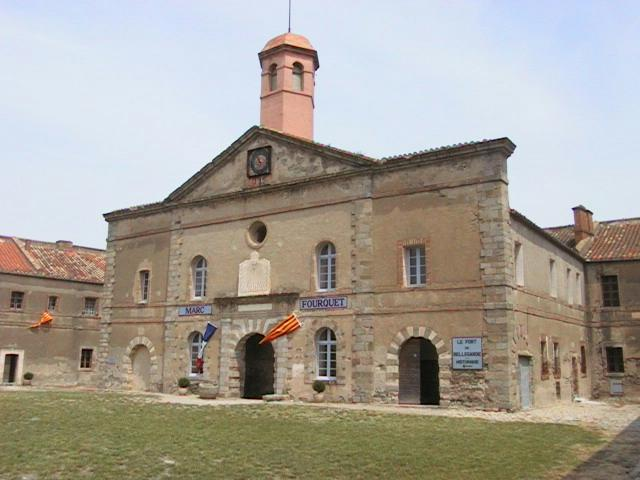
- Bellegarde fortress chapel.
Date	23 May to 24 June 1793
Location	Le Perthus, Pyrénées Orientales, France 42°27′31″N 2°51′33″E
Result	Spanish victory

Belligerents
Spain (Kingdom of France) French Émigrés	France

Commanders and leaders
(Spain) Antonio Ricardos	(France) Colonel Boisbrulé

Strength
6,000, 34 guns	1,536, 48 guns

Casualties and losses
Unknown	1,536
- Location within Europe

The siege of Bellegarde commenced on 23 May 1793 and ended on 24 June 1793 when Colonel Boisbrulé's French garrison surrendered the Fort de Bellegarde to a Spanish army under the command of Antonio Ricardos. The capture of the fort gave Spain control of an important road through the Pyrenees. The siege took place during the War of the Pyrenees, part of the French Revolutionary Wars. Fort de Bellegarde is on a height overlooking the border town of Le Perthus, which lies on the modern A9 autoroute and Autovía A-7.

== Background ==
King Louis XIV of France built Fort de Bellegarde after 1678 according to a plan drawn up by Sébastien de Vauban. This strong masonry fortress defended the Col du Perthus which crosses the Pyrenees at an altitude of 305 metres (1,001 ft). The pass is the most important route from Spain into France in the eastern Pyrenees. As Vauban noted, "Nothing overlooks this place", and the fortress is situated on the highest ground in the area.

When Spain went to war with revolutionary France in mid-April 1793, Captain General Antonio Ricardos faced a strategic problem. With Bellegarde dominating the main road into France, the Spanish commander had to capture the fort before he could use the main road as a supply route for his invading army. Accordingly, Ricardos crossed the Pyrenees 20 km to the southwest with 4,500 soldiers and descended on the village of Saint-Laurent-de-Cerdans. In the first skirmish of the War of the Pyrenees, the Spanish evicted the 400 French defenders. Continuing his left hook, Ricardos' 4,400 troops fell upon a French force at the town of Céret on the Tech River. The French, 800 regulars and 1,000 National Guards with 4 cannon, panicked and fled. Between 100 and 200 Frenchmen became victims of Spanish musketry and steel, while another 200 drowned trying to cross the Tech. Ricardos reported only 17 men wounded. During the initial operations, the Spanish commander placed a detachment near Bellegarde to keep Boisbrulé and his garrison from raiding Spanish supply convoys.

With the seizure of Céret, Ricardos placed his army nearly in the rear of Bellegarde. After receiving some reinforcements, he advanced farther to the northeast to the vicinity of Trouillas. At this location, the 7,000 Spanish troops were confronted by the Army of the Eastern Pyrenees led by General of Division Louis-Charles de Flers. At the Battle of Mas Deu on 19 May, Ricardos defeated de Flers with the loss of 150 killed, 280 wounded, plus three cannons and six ammunition wagons captured. The Spanish lost 34 killed and an unknown number of wounded. The demoralized French soldiers retreated north to the department capital of Perpignan, where a battalion of National Guard mutinied and had to be disbanded. Rather than press on, Ricardos turned back to besiege Bellegarde, which overlooked his main supply route back to Barcelona.

== Siege ==
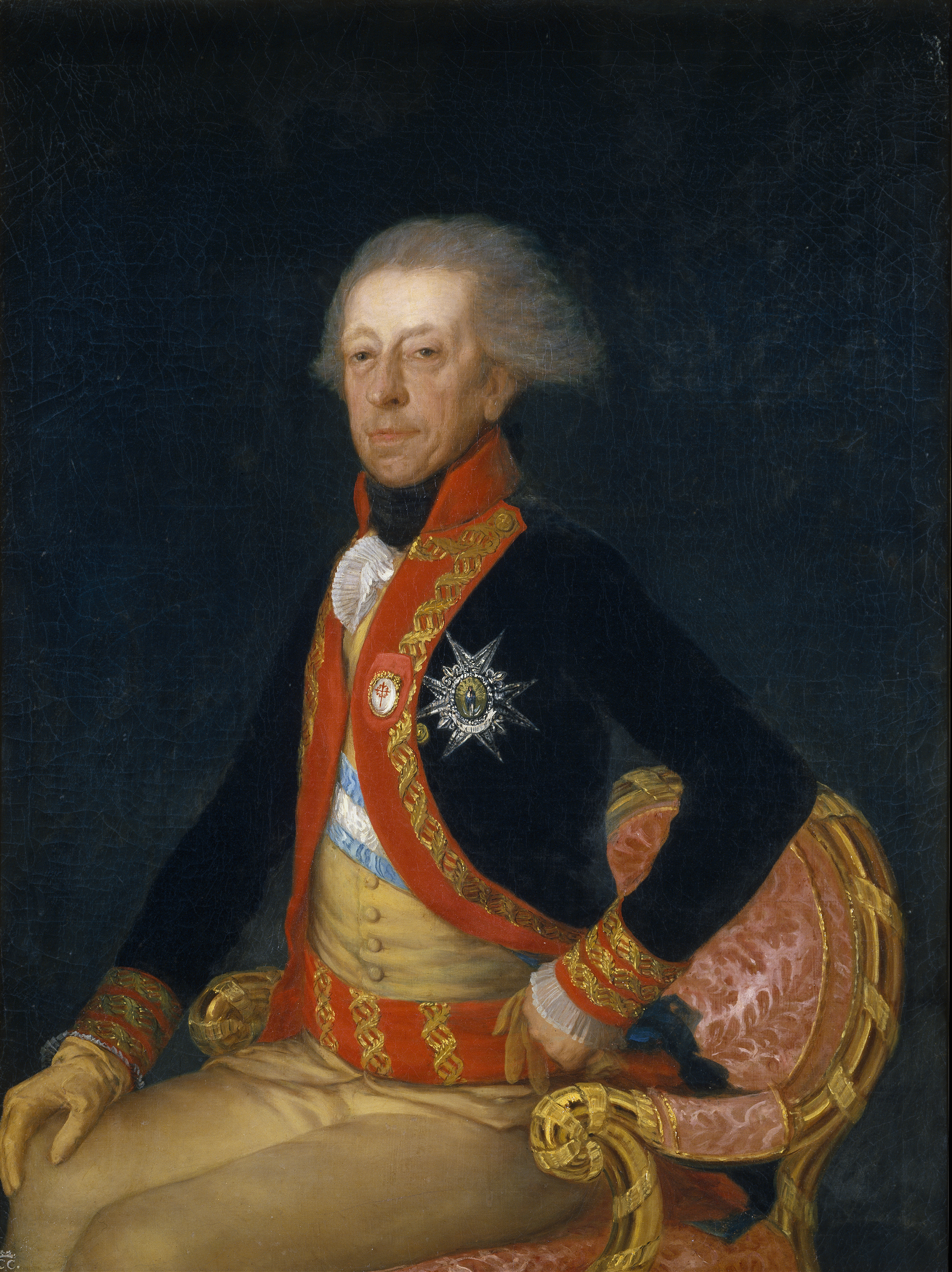
Antonio Ricardos

Concurrent with the siege of Bellegarde, Spanish General Antonio Ricardos attacked two French fortresses along the Tech River associated with Fort de Bellegarde, Fort les Bains at Amélie-les-Bains-Palalda 16 kilometers to the northwest and Fort de la Garde at Prats-de-Mollo-la-Preste 31 kilometers to the west. Fort les Bains was besieged on 23 May and the garrison of 350 men surrendered on 3 June after bombardment. The 200 man garrison of Fort de la Garde surrendered on 5 June after the fort's water supply was cut off.

The siege of Bellegarde and its garrison of 1,536 French soldiers began on 23 May. The garrison's firepower included at least 41 cannon and seven mortars. For several weeks the Spanish siege guns pounded Fort de Bellegarde until a breach was made in the main wall. By this time, 42 of the approximately 50 French artillery pieces were dismounted. Facing the prospect of an assault with his defenses compromised, Boisbrulé formally surrendered Bellegarde on 24 June. The remaining soldiers of the garrison marched into captivity. During the month-long siege, the French suffered losses of 30 killed, 56 wounded, and 1,450 captured. Spanish losses are not known.

== Results ==
With the Fort de Bellegarde secured, the Spanish army was able to use the Col de La Perthus as a supply route. Ricardos advanced on the city of Roussillon but suffered a stinging repulse at the Battle of Perpignan on 17 July 1793. De Flers' French suffered 800 casualties out of a total of 12,000 troops. The French also lost one cannon and had 600 desertions. Out of 15,000 soldiers, the Spanish lost approximately 1,000 casualties. De Flers had used the month in which Ricardos reduced Bellegarde to train his green recruits and surround Perpignan with field fortifications. The French turned back Ricardos again in the Battle of Peyrestortes on 17 September, but the Spanish turned the tables on their opponents in the Battle of Truillas five days later.

== Footnotes ==
Preceded by Battle of Hondschoote	French Revolution: Revolutionary campaigns Siege of Bellegarde (1793)	Succeeded by Battle of Peyrestortes
