= Antonio Ricardos =

Spanish general (1727–1794)

Antonio Ricardos Carrillo de Albornoz
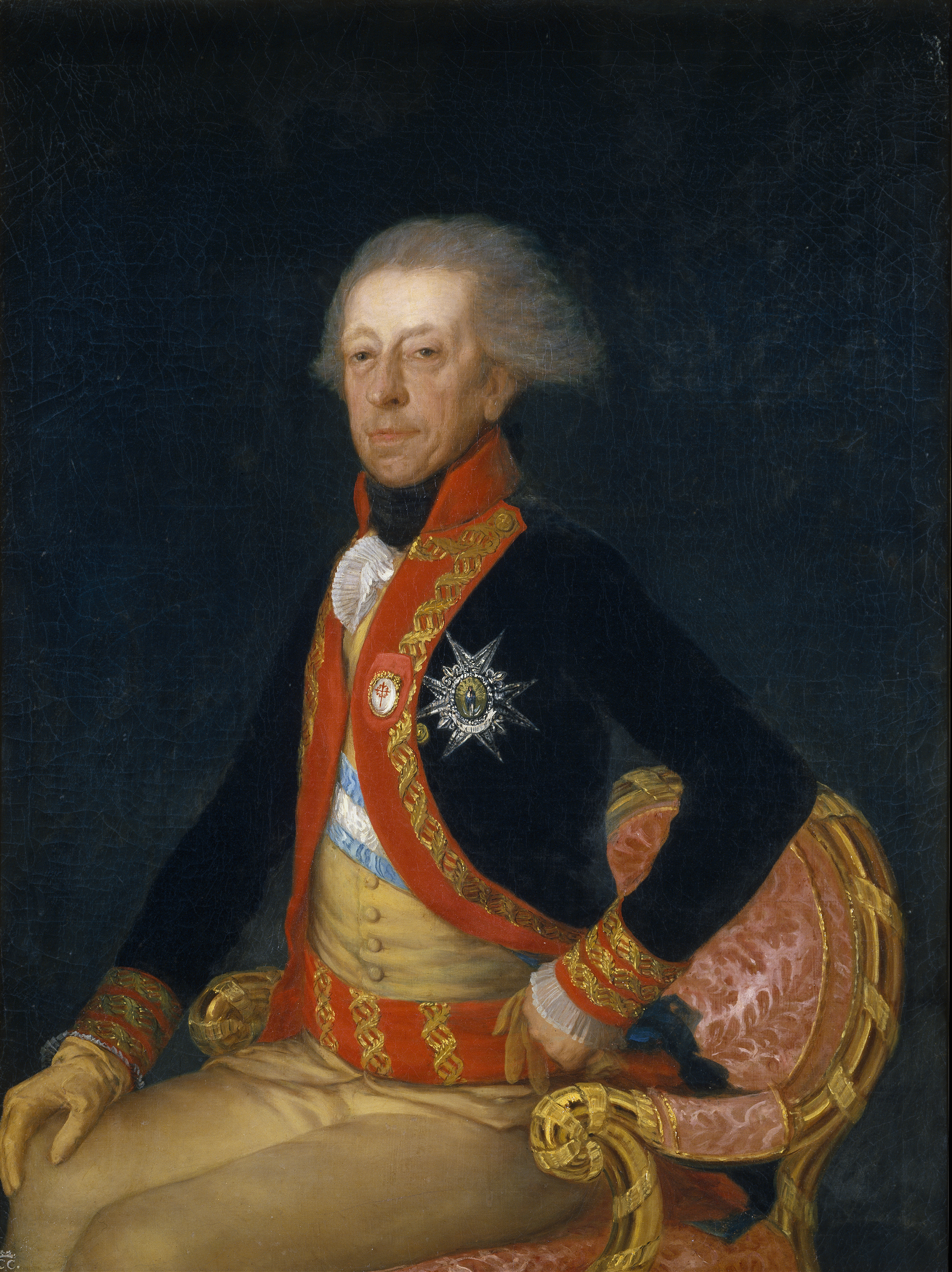
- Antonio Ricardos by Francisco Goya
- Born: 1727; Barbastro, Spain
- Died: 13 March 1794 (aged 66–67); Madrid, Spain
- Military career
- Allegiance: Spain
- Branch: Cavalry
- Rank: Captain general
- Conflicts: War of the Austrian Succession; Battle of Piacenza; Spanish-Portuguese War; French Revolutionary Wars; Battle of Mas Deu; Siege of Bellegarde; Battle of Perpignan; Battle of Peyrestortes; Battle of Truillas; Battle of the Tech; Battle of Villelongue
- Awards: Knight-commander of the Order of Santiago (1768); Order of Charles III, Grand Cross (1794)

Antonio Ricardos Carrillo de Albornoz (1727 in Barbastro – 13 March 1794) was a Spanish general. He joined the army of the Kingdom of Spain and fought against Habsburg Austria, the Kingdom of Portugal, and the French First Republic during a long military career. By embracing the Spanish Enlightenment, he earned the displeasure of conservative elements of society. He played an active role in reforming the Spanish military. Upon the outbreak of the War of the Pyrenees in 1793, the king sent him to command the army in Catalonia. He invaded Roussillon where he won several victories over the French. After his death in early 1794, the war went badly for Spain.

== Early career ==
In 1727, Ricardos was born in the same house as the dramatist and poet Lupercio Leonardo de Argensola in the city of Barbastro, part of Aragon. He joined his father's regiment, the Cavalry of Malta, while still in his teens. Being of noble blood, he served as a captain, and at the age of 16 briefly commanded the regiment in place of his father. In the War of the Austrian Succession, he fought in the Battle of Piacenza on 16 June 1746 and in another action on the Tidone River on 10 August of that year.

== Enlightened reformer ==
Nearly twenty years later, Ricardos fought in the Spanish–Portuguese conflict known as the Fantastic War (1761–1763), which was part of the Seven Years' War. Afterward he seriously studied the military organization of the Kingdom of Prussia. King Charles III of Spain then sent him on a mission to reorganize the military system of New Spain. In 1768 he was a member of the commission to establish the border between Spain and France and, for this meritorious service, he received an "Encomienda" in the Orden de Santiago. Ricardos accepted the Age of Enlightenment and its reforms. He co-founded the Royal Economic Society of Madrid. Promoted to lieutenant general (LG) and appointed Inspector of Cavalry, he established the Ocaña Military College where he taught the techniques of modern warfare.

As an enlightened reformer, Ricardos was opposed by the conservative forces of society, epitomised by the Spanish Inquisition, which remained in existence until 1834. Thanks to the Encomienda de Santiago, he was able to escape the worst attentions of the Inquisition and its political allies. However, his enemies forced him to leave Ocaña and take up a lesser position in Guipuzcoa in the north.

== War with France ==
When King Louis XVI and Queen Marie Antoinette were executed in the French Revolution, Spain prepared to join the First Coalition. King Charles IV of Spain promoted Ricardos to Captain General (CG) and sent him take command of the army in Catalonia. When the War of the Pyrenees broke out, Ricardos invaded France on 17 April 1793 with 4,500 soldiers, capturing Saint-Laurent-de-Cerdans. He then routed 1,800 Frenchmen at Céret on the 20th, thus isolating the imposing Fort de Bellegarde at the Pass of Le Perthus. After beating Louis-Charles de Flers and the French Army of the Eastern Pyrenees at the Battle of Mas Deu on 19 May, he turned back to invest Bellegarde. The Siege of Bellegarde ended on 24 June when the French garrison surrendered. Ricardos faced de Flers again in the Battle of Perpignan on 17 July. On his occasion, Ricardos was defeated, but only after inflicting 800 killed and wounded on his enemies.

On 28 August, French General Luc Siméon Auguste Dagobert defeated Manuel la Peña, at Puigcerdà in the central Pyrenees. In early September, Ricardos tried to isolate and capture Perpignan by swinging two divisions around its western side while bombarding it in front. However, his subordinates lacked his tactical skill. On 17 September, French Eustache Charles d'Aoust repulsed Juan de Courten and Jerónimo Girón-Moctezuma, Marquis de las Amarillas at the Battle of Peyrestortes. This costly setback marked the high tide of the Spanish invasion. Ricardos quickly rallied his army and confronted the victorious French. He inflicted a sharp defeat on Dagobert at the Battle of Truillas on 22 September. In this major action, the Spanish suffered 2,000 casualties out of 17,000 engaged, while French losses numbered 4,500 out of a total of 22,000. After his victory, Ricardos fell back to defend the Tech River valley. He repulsed d'Aoust in an action at Le Boulou on 3 October, where the 1,200 French casualties were four times greater than Spanish losses. He won another victory over Louis Marie Turreau at the Battle of the Tech (Pla del Rey) in mid-October.

While leading a mixed force of 3,000 Spanish and 5,000 Portuguese, Ricardos defeated d'Aoust again on 7 December at Villelongue-dels-Monts in the Pyrenees foothills. This was his last victory. Two weeks later his subordinate Gregorio García de la Cuesta routed the French defenders of Collioure, capturing that port. Ricardos returned to Madrid to plead for reinforcements and died there of pneumonia on 6 March 1794. His successor, Alejandro O'Reilly died on 23 March 1794, leaving Luis Firmín de Carvajal, Conde de la Unión in command of the Spanish army. De la Unión proved unable to stop the French from recovering Bellegarde and Collioure in 1794, and died at the Battle of the Black Mountain on Spanish soil in November. In early 1795, the Siege of Roses ended in a French victory. The Peace of Basel ended the war in July 1795. Ricardos' widow became the Countess of Truillas in honor of his victories.

== Sources ==
- Hamel, Michael C. "The Roussillon Campaign of 1793-94: Spain’s Lost Opportunity." Age of Revolutions (13 May 2024). https://ageofrevolutions.com/2024/05/13/the-roussillon-campaign-of-1793-94-spains-lost-opportunity/.
- Ostermann, Georges. "Pérignon: The Unknown Marshal". Chandler, David, ed. Napoleon's Marshals. New York: Macmillan, 1987. ISBN 0-02-905930-5
- Smith, Digby. The Napoleonic Wars Data Book. London: Greenhill, 1998. ISBN 1-85367-276-9
