= Battle of Perpignan =

Battle of the War of the First Coalition

Coordinates: 42.6986°N 2.8956°E

Battle of Perpignan (1793)
- Part of the War of the Pyrenees
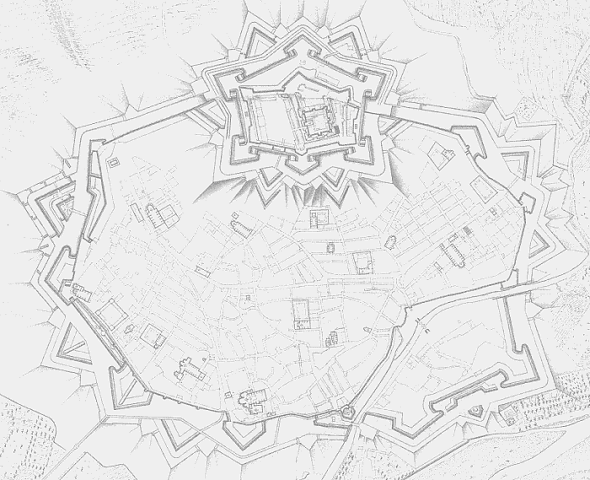
- Plan of Perpignan fortress with south up.
Date	17 July 1793
Location	Perpignan, Pyrénées Orientales, France
Result	French victory

Belligerents
(French First Republic) France	Spain

Commanders and leaders
(French First Republic) Louis-Charles de Flers	(Spain) Antonio Ricardos

Strength
12,000	15,000

Casualties and losses
800	1,000

The Battle of Perpignan or Battle of Niel (fr:Bataille de Perpignan) on 17 July 1793 saw the French Army of the Eastern Pyrenees led by Louis-Charles de Flers defending against an offensive by the Spanish Army of Catalonia commanded by Antonio Ricardos. The French turned back the Spanish attacks and forced their opponents to pull back. Perpignan is now the capital of Pyrénées Orientales department, but in 1793 was the chief city of Roussillon province. The action was fought during the War of the Pyrenees, part of the War of the First Coalition.

== Background ==
Captain General Ricardos and his Spanish army defeated the French in a skirmish at Céret on 20 April 1793. The Spanish beat Louis-Charles de Flers and the Army of the Eastern Pyrenees at the Battle of Mas Deu on 19 May. After this success, Ricardos turned back and invested the Fort de Bellegarde. The Siege of Bellegarde lasted from 23 May until 24 June when the French garrison's 1,450 survivors capitulated. During the siege, the Spanish army captured the Fort de Bains on 3 June and the Fort de la Garde on 5 June. While the Spanish reduced Bellegarde, de Flers was busy trying to turn his raw recruits into soldiers. He was able to secure the services of trained coastal gunners to man his artillery. He had a number of field fortifications built to defend the area.

== French Defences ==
The French troops defending the area included:

- 19éme Régiment de Chasseurs à Cheval (Rosenthal)
- 7éme Régiment d'Infanterie de Ligne (Champagne)
- 20éme Régiment d'Infanterie de Ligne (Cambrésis) – Suffered massively to officers' desertion and a planned takeover of the fort
- 35éme Régiment d'Infanterie de Ligne (Aquitaine)
- 36éme Régiment d'Infanterie de Ligne (Anjou)
- 53éme Régiment d'Infanterie de Ligne (Alsace)
- 57éme Régiment d'Infanterie de Ligne (Beauvoisis)
- 59éme Régiment d'Infanterie de Ligne (Bourgogne)
- 70éme Régiment d'Infanterie de Ligne (Médoc)
- 72éme Régiment d'Infanterie de Ligne (Vexin)
- 79éme Régiment d'Infanterie de Ligne (Boulonnais)

== Battle ==
With the fortress captured, Ricardos turned his attention to De Flers' army which was holding Perpignan. On 17 July 1793, the Spanish commander split his 15,000 available troops into five columns. He intended for the columns to envelop Perpignan on all sides. The first column on the far right was directed to seize Cabestany on the southeast side of Perpignan. The second column, led by Jerónimo Girón-Moctezuma, Marquis de las Amarillas, was ordered to advance via Canohès and Nyls to Orles, southwest of the city. The third column was to move from Thuir and Trouillas to seize Pézilla-la-Rivière on the Têt River. The fourth and fifth columns were instructed to cross the Têt at Millas. From there, the fourth column was to strike east to Saint-Estève. The fifth column under Luis Firmín de Carvajal, Conde de la Unión would thrust northeast to capture a key bridge near Rivesaltes.

Initially, all the Spanish columns made progress. The third column seized some important hills near Orles. But the Marquis de las Amarillas' column got held up and failed to support the third column. De Flers saw an opportunity and fell on the isolated third column in strength, driving it back. Conde de la Unión's column turned back to help and was able to stabilize the line for a while. However, the French launched another attack and routed the Spanish soldiers.

== Result ==
The French lost 800 killed and wounded out of 12,000 men. The Spanish captured one gun. Despite the victory, two National Guard battalions were disbanded for trying to surrender and 600 more soldiers deserted the colors. In the fighting near Nyls, the Spanish lost 31 killed, 131 wounded, and three captured. However, it is estimated that a total of 1,000 Spanish troops became casualties during the battle. The Spanish army was defeated because its columns were not within supporting distance of one another. This allowed de Flers to take advantage of the third column's isolation.
