= Louis-Charles de Flers =

French general

Louis-Charles de La Motte-Ango, vicomte de Flers
- Born: 12 June 1754; Paris, France
- Died: 22 July 1794 (aged 40) Paris, France
- Allegiance: France
- Rank: General of Division
- Conflicts: French Revolutionary Wars; Battle of Jemappes; Battle of Mas Deu; Siege of Bellegarde; Battle of Perpignam

Louis-Charles de La Motte-Ango, vicomte de Flers (12 June 1754 – 22 July 1794) joined the French Royal army and rose in rank to become a general officer in the French Revolutionary Wars. After serving in the Austrian Netherlands, he was appointed to command the Army of the Eastern Pyrenees. His army suffered several defeats in May and June 1793, but he rallied his troops to win a defensive victory at the Battle of Perpignan in July. The all-powerful Representatives-on-mission arrested him in August 1793 for a minor setback and sent him to Paris under arrest. The Committee of Public Safety executed him by guillotine on trumped up charges in the last days of the Reign of Terror. De Flers is one of the names inscribed under the Arc de Triomphe.

== Early career ==
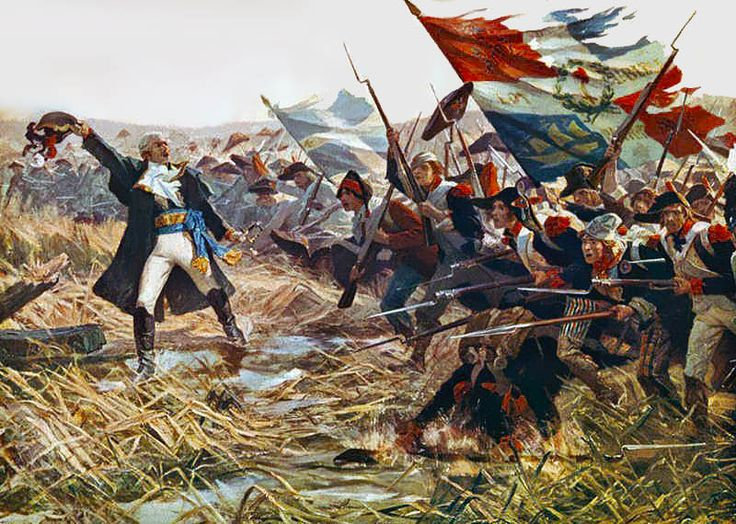
De Flers fought at Jemappes

De Flers was born into a noble family in Paris on 12 June 1754. His parents were Ange Hyacinthe Ango de la Motte-Ango, comte de Flers (1719–1788) and Marie Madeleine Charlotte de Chertemps de Seuil, baroness de Reaux (1722–1775). De Flers enlisted in a cavalry regiment at a very early age. He embraced the French Revolution and became a marechal de camp in 1791. At the direction of General Charles Francois Dumouriez, de Flers established the camp of Maulde in 1792 and was badly wounded defending it. After recovering, he joined Dumouriez's invasion of Belgium as a division commander in 1792.

On 6 November 1792 he commanded the Reserve of the Left Wing at the Battle of Jemappes. Under his command were two squadrons of Mounted National Gendarmes and a number of grenadier battalions. The French defeat at the Battle of Neerwinden on 18 March 1793, left de Flers commanding an isolated garrison at Breda. After a brief siege, he surrendered the place and was allowed to march out with the honors of war on 3 April.

== War of the Pyrenees ==
On 14 May General of Division de Flers assumed command of the Army of the Eastern Pyrenees. The War of the Pyrenees had opened badly for the French. The Spanish Army of Catalonia under Captain General Antonio Ricardos invaded France on 17 April with 4,500 men and routed the 400-man garrison of Saint-Laurent-de-Cerdans. Three days later, the Spanish force fell upon the 1,800 French defenders of Céret. The French were defeated with losses of 100 to 200 killed, wounded, and missing. In addition, 200 soldiers drowned in the Tech River trying to swim to safety. Ricardos reported losing only 17 men wounded.

On 19 May, Ricardos with 7,000 troops advanced on de Flers' camp of Mas Deu, a group of medieval-era buildings established by the Knights Templar. In the Battle of Mas Deu, the French suffered losses of 150 killed, 280 wounded, three 6-pound cannons, and six ammunition wagons. The Spanish lost 34 killed and an unknown number wounded. De Flers fell back to the fortress of Perpignan where a battalion of National Guard mutinied and had to be disbanded. Rather than pursue his beaten enemy, Ricardos turned back to invest the Fort de Bellegarde.

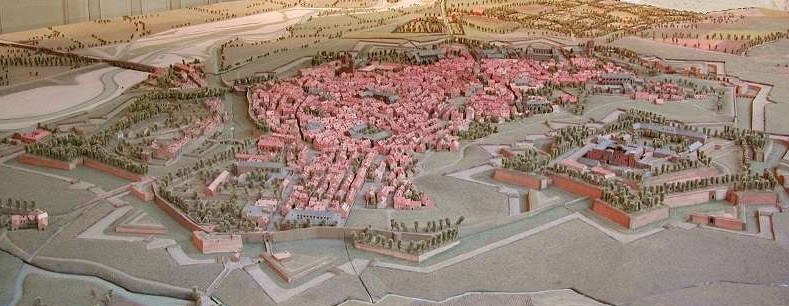
A model of the fortress of Perpignan

The powerful Bellegarde fortress guarded the Le Perthus pass at 300 metres (984 ft) altitude on the main road between Barcelona and Perpignan. De Flers tried to relieve the garrison without success, including an attempt by 3,350 men to escort a supply convoy through the siege lines on 29 May. While the Spanish army was preoccupied with the siege, de Flers drove another enemy force away from the port of Collioure. The Siege of Bellegarde ended on 24 June with a French surrender.

After the fall of Bellegarde, de Flers began arming the local farmers. Ricardos wrote a letter on 3 July protesting this, and threatening to hang any civilian caught with arms. De Flers replied that all Frenchmen were soldiers and that their only uniform was the tricolor cockade. He also promised to retaliate if the Spanish began shooting civilians. De Flers drilled his troops so that they might fight the Spanish regulars on more equal terms. He also put his men to work building field fortifications around Perpignan and drafted experienced coastal artillerists to serve the guns in his redoubts. When the Spanish attacked again his efforts paid off.

On 17 July, de Flers with 12,000 soldiers turned back an attack by Ricardos and 15,000 Spanish troops in the Battle of Perpignan. Historian Digby Smith called the Battle of Niel a French victory and gave French losses as 800 killed and wounded, plus one cannon captured. Smith listed Spanish casualties as only 31 killed, 131 wounded, and three captured. A second authority gave de Flers credit for good tactical leadership and stated that Spanish casualties numbered 1,000. When Ricardos sent five separate columns forward to envelop Perpignan, de Flers concentrated his main strength on the third column and defeated it. The fifth column turned back to assist the third column, but the French routed it as well to claim the victory. A third authority called the July battle a French triumph, but gave no details.

== Execution ==
On 4 August 1793, a Spanish force captured Villefranche-de-Conflent in the Cerdagne. Though this was a relatively minor defeat, the Representatives-on-mission accused de Flers of treason. Arrested and sent to prison in Paris, de Flers was brought before a Revolutionary Tribunal the following year. The court condemned him to die for communicating with enemies of the state and for taking part in the Luxembourg Prison conspiracies, charges which one source called a "ridiculous pretext". De Flers went to the guillotine on 22 July 1794. Five days later, the government fell and Maximilien de Robespierre and his political allies quickly shared de Flers' fate. The name DEFLERS is inscribed on Column 33 of the Arc de Triomphe.

De Flers was married to Maximilienne Albertine Guillemine de Latre-Neuville. The couple had two children, a daughter Guillemine Aline Ange, born in 1787, and a son Charles Amédée Guillain who was born in 1789 and died in 1857. Guillemine married Alexandre René de Saffray (b. 1785) on 18 August 1828. Charles Amédée first married Anne Bernard Flavie de Froissard (1801–1835). His second wife was countess Nathalie Charlotte Ferdinande d'Oultremont (1818-1900).
