= First Battle of Sant Llorenç de la Muga =

Coordinates: 42.3158°N 2.9303°E

Battle of San Lorenzo de la Muga
- Part of the War of the Pyrenees
Date	19 May 1794
Location	Sant Llorenç de la Muga, Catalonia, Spain
Result	French victory

Belligerents
Republican France	Spain; Portugal

Commanders and leaders
(France) Jacques Dugommier (France) Pierre Augereau	(Spain) Conde de la Unión; John Forbes

Strength
6,000	15,000

Casualties and losses
Unknown	Unknown

The First Battle of Sant Llorenç de la Muga (Catalan) or Spanish: San Lorenzo de la Muga) (19 May 1794) between a Spanish army commanded by the Luis Firmín de Carvajal, Conde de la Unión and a French army led by Jacques François Dugommier. Two weeks earlier, the French had driven the Spanish army from French territory in the Second Battle of Boulou. Pierre Augereau's division was separated from the main body of Dugommier's army and La Unión hoped to take advantage of its isolation. The Spanish mounted an overly complex attack on Sant Llorenç de la Muga that Augereau's French division repulsed.
