= Juan de Courten (elder) =

Juan Courten y Gonzalez
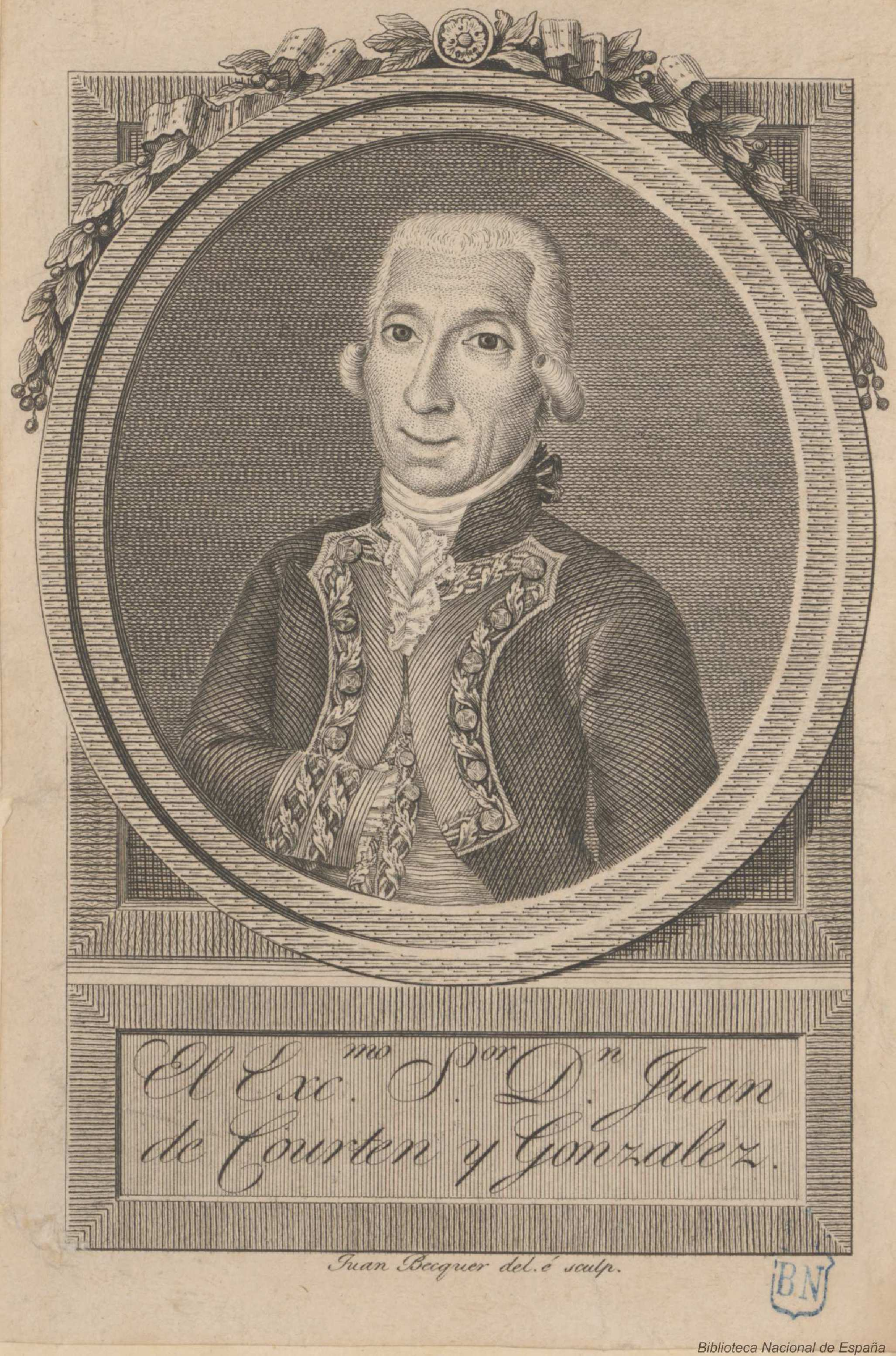
- Born: 10 October 1730; Tortosa
- Died: 21 December 1796 (aged 66); Zaragoza
- Military career
- Allegiance: Kingdom of Spain
- Branch: Infantry
- Rank: Lieutenant General
- Conflicts: War of the Austrian Succession; Spanish–Portuguese War; Great Siege of Gibraltar; War of the Pyrenees
- Other work: Governor of Oran (1790–1792)

Juan Courten y Gonzalez (10 October 1730 – 21 December 1796) was a Spanish military officer. He began his career in the War of the Austrian Succession at the age of 14. Courten fought in the Fantastic War, the Invasion of Algiers in 1775, and the Great Siege of Gibraltar. He was the last Spanish governor of Oran in 1792. As a lieutenant general, he led an infantry division during the War of the Pyrenees against the French First Republic in several actions including Perpignan, Peyrestortes, Truillas, Boulou, and the Black Mountain. He was appointed Captain General of Aragon in 1795.

== Early career ==
Born on 10 October 1730, in Tortosa, Courten hailed from a family that migrated to Spain from the Valais, in present-day Switzerland. His father was Brigadier General Jean-Etienne Amand de Courten, a military engineer. In 1692, his grandfather Amand de Courten had married Anne Judith Herreford, the daughter of a rich English merchant, and the couple had three sons. Amand was killed in the Siege of Venlo on 13 September 1702, during the War of the Spanish Succession. Jean-Etienne Amand was born in 1695 in Dunkirk and went to the Royal Military Academy in Barcelona in 1719 to study engineering. He married Ana Antonio Gonzales in 1726 and was killed in the siege of Tortona on 3 September 1745, during the War of the Austrian Succession.

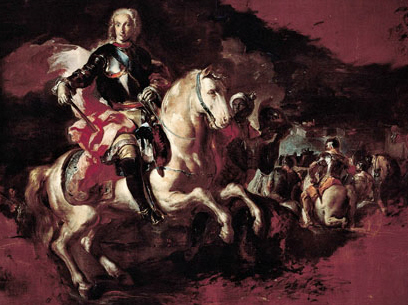
King Charles III of Spain was victorious at the Battle of Velletri.

Juan Antonio de Courten joined the Spanish army at the age of 12 and served in the Walloon Guards Regiment. He became an ensign on 11 January 1744 while in garrison at Rimini. He participated in the War of the Austrian Succession, fighting at the Battle of Velletri on 12 August 1744 and the Battle of Piacenza on 16 June 1746. He was also present at the sieges of Alessandria, Tortona, and Valenza during this period. On 13 August 1746 he became a second lieutenant. Promotion to first lieutenant came on 22 September 1754 and the following year he was appointed adjutant major of an artillery detachment.

Courten served in the Fantastic War. He was promoted to captain on 14 May 1768. In 1775 Courten took part in the Invasion of Algiers, a humiliating defeat of the Spanish army at the hands of the Moors. Because of public anger at the disaster, the officers who were involved were disgraced and posted far from the royal court. Officers whose reputations suffered in the debacle were Alejandro O'Reilly, Antonio Ricardos, Luis Firmín de Carvajal, Conde de la Unión, Jerónimo Girón-Moctezuma, Marquis de las Amarillas, Domingo Izquierdo, Pedro Caro, 3rd Marquis of la Romana, and Ventura Caro. These men banded together in a secret society within the military to push for modernization. Courten was a member of this group.

Courten fought under Ventura Caro in the Great Siege of Gibraltar which lasted from 1779 to 1783. He was elevated in rank to brigadier general on 1 January 1783 and to mariscal de campo on 14 January 1789. With the temporary rank of lieutenant general, he was put in command of the Walloon Guards. Courten was the last Spanish governor of Oran. He commanded from 4 November 1790 to 17 February 1792. On that date the port passed into the hands of the Ottoman Empire. Oran had been under Spanish control since 1732. Courten followed royal orders to evacuate Oran, removing all Spanish property accumulated during the long occupation.

== War of the Pyrenees ==
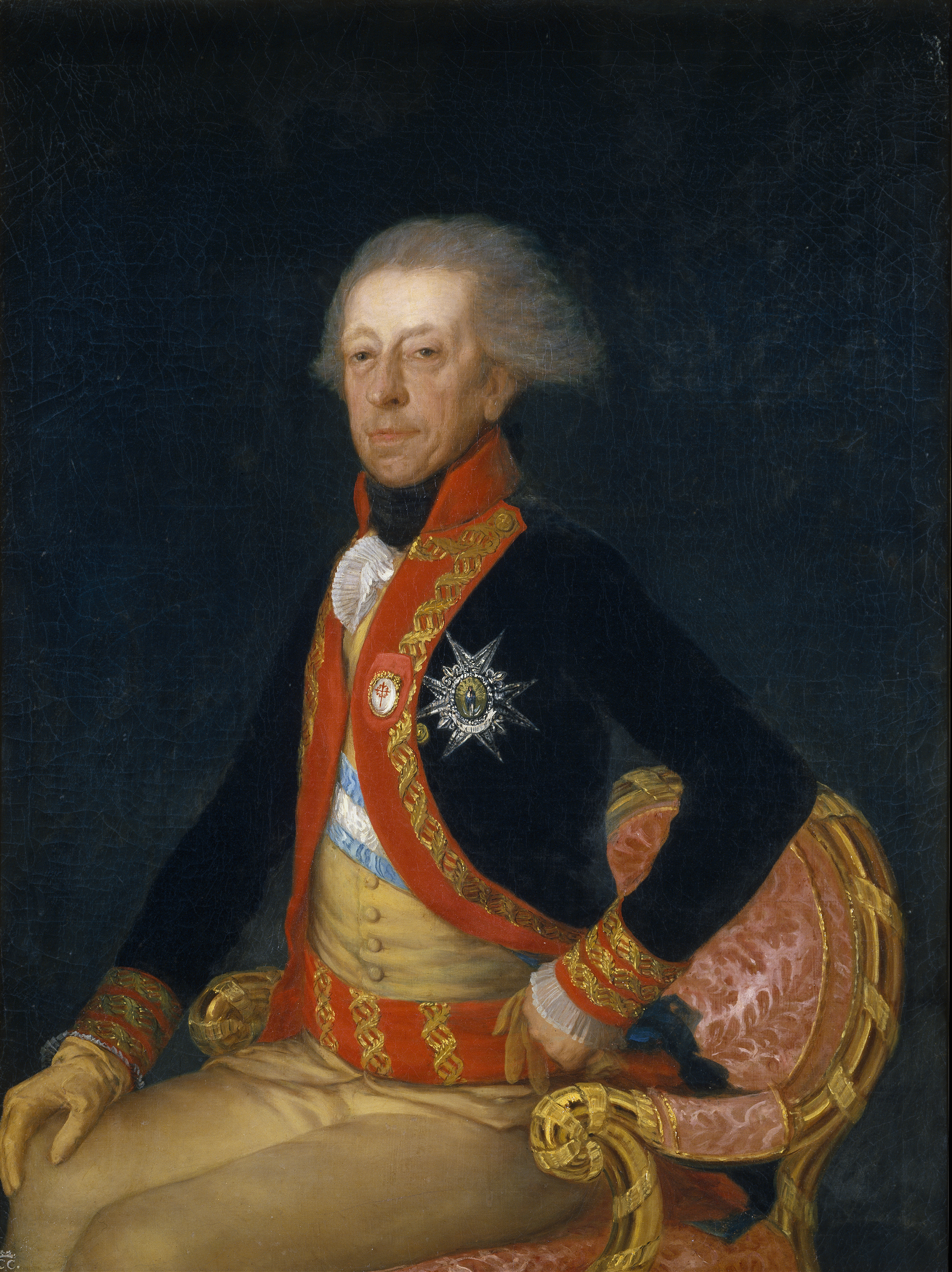
Antonio Ricardos had a good opinion of Courten.

Promoted to teniente general, Courten played a prominent role in the War of the Pyrenees against the French First Republic which began in 1793. The army commander Ricardos had a good opinion of Courten's military competence and entrusted him with important commands. He led the 1st, 2nd, and 6th Battalions of the Walloon Guards in the Battle of Perpignan on 17 July 1793. His troops acquitted themselves well in this unsuccessful action. On 17 September 1793 he fought at the Battle of Peyrestortes. The French attacked his division in its camp at Le Vernet and forced it to retreat with a loss of 1,200 soldiers, 26 guns, and seven colors. He played a notable part in the Spanish victory at the Battle of Truillas five days later. At Truillas, 24,000 French attacked in the morning but were stopped. Don Juan Courten and the Count de la Union led an infantry counterattack that helped win the battle. The French lost 1,500 prisoners and 10 artillery pieces.

After directing his troops in an action at the Col de Banyuls on 14 December, the 63-year-old general became ill. He fought in the Battle of Boulou in late April and early May 1794. In October 1794 an order of battle listed Teniente General Courten as commanding the following units. They were two battalions of the Burgos Line Infantry Regiment, one battalion each of the Principe Line Infantry, Granada Militia, and Voluntarios de Tarragona Light Infantry, the first battalions of the España, Extremadura, Granada, Malaga, and Savoia Line Infantry, and one company of Granaderos de Cordoba.

Courten commanded the left wing at the Battle of the Black Mountain. On 17 and 18 November 1794 Pierre Augereau's French division defeated Courten and forced his troops to withdraw. The climax of the battle came on 20 November when the French overran the Roure redoubt in the center and put the Spanish army to flight. Both army commanders were killed in the hard-fought action, Conde de la Unión and Jacques François Dugommier. In 1795 Courten was appointed Captain General of Aragon. He died near Zaragoza on 21 December 1796.

== Family ==
The Curten family was originally from Italy but moved to Switzerland where they settled near the Simplon Pass. By charging tolls on travelers they became wealthy and built a castle in the Valais canton. Later they altered the family name to Courten. The family was important enough that they raised a regiment of mercenary Swiss soldiers to serve in the French royal army. This arrangement continued until the Swiss regiments were suppressed by the French Legislative Assembly on 20 August 1792. In 1789 the De Courten Regiment Nr. 88 was commanded by Antoine-Pancrace, Comté de Courten who was born on 6 October 1720 and died later that year on 27 November. Other leading officers were Joseph Hyacinthe Elie and Charles de Preux. After 1792 the regiment was taken into the army of King Charles IV of Spain. In 1808 the Spanish army included the Preux Swiss Regiment Nr. 6 with 1,708 men in two battalions. The unit was stationed at Madrid.

A younger Juan de Courten was promoted to mariscal de campo in 1810 and commanded troops at the Siege of Tarragona in May and June 1811.
