= Luc Siméon Auguste Dagobert =

Luc Siméon Auguste Dagobert de Fontenille
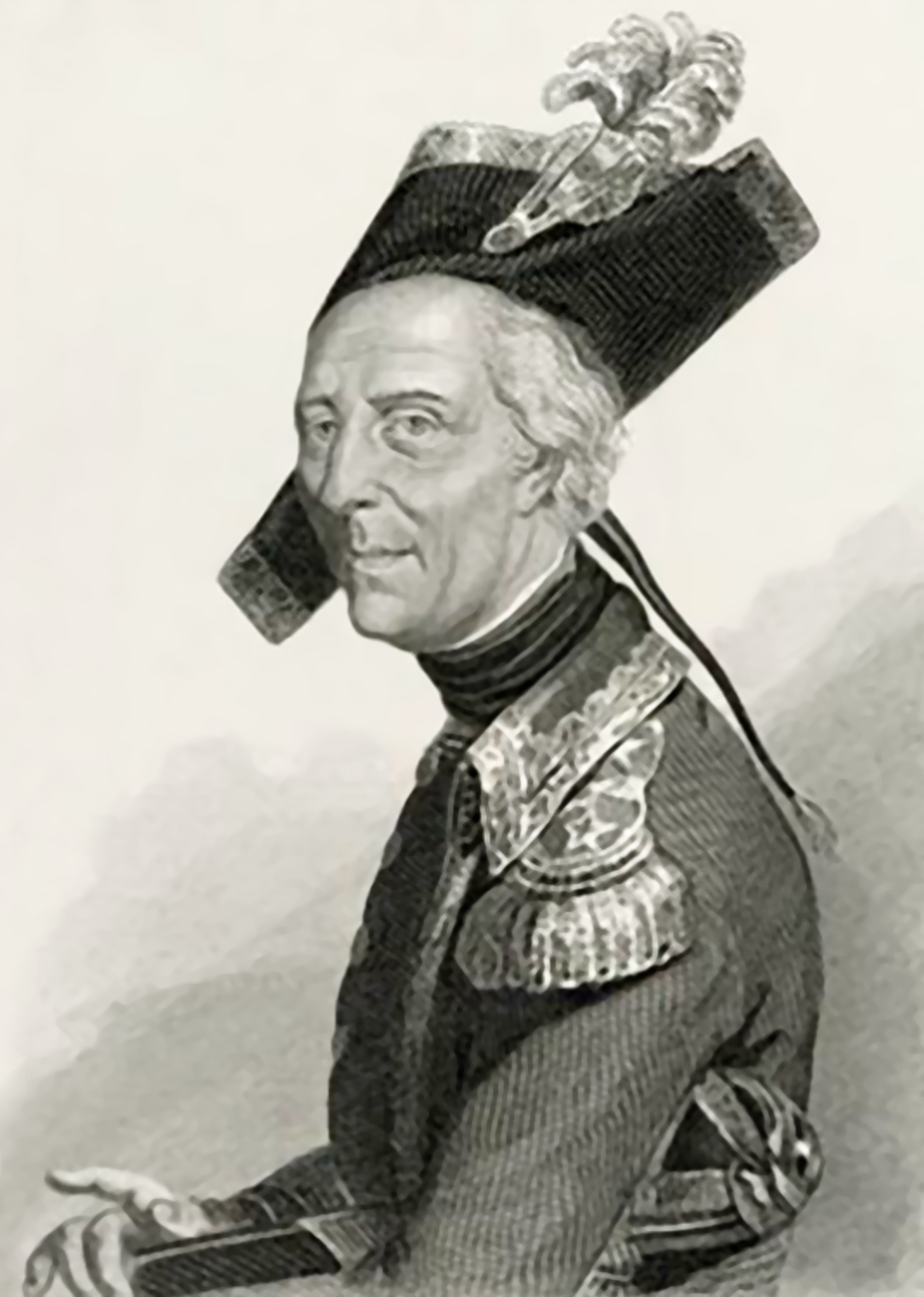
- General Dagobert de Fontenille
- Born: 8 March 1736; La Chapelle-en-Juger, France
- Died: 18 April 1794 (aged 58) Puigcerdà, Spain
- Allegiance: Kingdom of France; Kingdom of France; French First Republic
- Service years: 1792–1794
- Rank: General, Commander in chief
- Awards: Name engraved on the raised column at the Panthéon; Name engraved on the Arc de Triomphe in Paris; Monument in Mont-Louis

Luc Siméon Auguste Dagobert de Fontenille (English: /ˌdæɡoʊˈbɛər/ dag-oh-BAIR, French: [lyk simeɔ̃ oɡyst daɡɔbɛʁ də fɔ̃tənij]; 8 March 1736, La Chapelle-en-Juger, near Saint-Lô, Manche – 18 April 1794, Puigcerdà) was a French general of the French Revolutionary Wars.

== Life ==
=== Ancien Régime ===
Descended from a noble family, Dagobert de Fontenille was major of the bataillon de chasseurs royaux du Dauphiné in 1788. Sous-lieutenant in the régiment de Touraine, he served in the Seven Years' War as an officer in Le Royal-Italien, and remained in that unit for the Corsican campaign of 1769. Whilst on Corsica he came into direct contact with the Bonaparte family.

By his marriage on 8 August 1780 to Jacquette Pailhoux de Cascastel (daughter of a Conseiller souverain of Le Roussillon), he became master of the forges and formed a company to exploit the mines at Les Corbières and Le Razès under the jurisdiction of the abbey of Lagrasse with his cousin, Jean-Pierre François Duhamel, correspondent of the Académie des sciences and commissaire of Louis XVI for mines and forges.

=== Under the French Revolution ===
In 1789, he and Louis-Philippe d'Orléans, grand-maître of the Grand Orient de France, rallied to the revolutionary cause. He was made colonel in May 1792, at the outbreak of the War of the First Coalition, and sent to the Army of the Var, in which he had many successes. Moved to the Army of Italy under d'Anselme and Biron, he distinguished himself before Nice and at the col de Negro.

==== War against Spain ====
When the French National Convention declared war on Spain on 7 March 1793, de Fontenille moved to the Army of the Eastern Pyrenees, under general de Flers, and commanded an entrenched camp of 8,000 men. He repulsed a Spanish attack on this position on 19 May but was still forced to abandon it, though he then stopped an enemy column of 6,000 men marching on Perpignan. Made commander in chief of the Armée centrale des Pyrénées after de Flers was removed from this post, he seized Puycerda on 29 August 1793 and the whole of the Spanish Cerdagne within 24 hours, before defeating the Spanish again on 4 September 1793 at Mont-Louis, capturing 14 cannon and recapturing part of Le Roussillon.

Made commander in chief of the Army of the Eastern Pyrenees in September after Barbantane's removal, he renounced this position after his defeat on 27 September at Truillas by the Spanish general Antonio Ricardos.

==== Fall from and return to favour ====
He was discharged for this defeat and returned to Paris to give an account of his conduct. He was imprisoned, then released and returned to his previous post at the head of the Army of the Eastern Pyrenees. Arriving back at Perpignan in March 1794, he could not obtain some battalions from Dugommier (12,000 infantry and 600 cavalry in total) which had been put at his disposal. He nevertheless invaded Spain, where he removed several enemy positions and won various victories, taking Urgel on 10 April 1794, before dying of illness at Puigcerdà in April 1794. The Convention decided to engrave his name on the raised column at the Panthéon.

== Family ==
François-Gilles Dagobert, a cousin of Dagobert de Fontenille via a cadet (and Breton) branch of the family, took up the revolutionary torch in 1793 at the time of the War in the Vendée.

== Sources ==
- "Luc Siméon Auguste Dagobert", in Charles Mullié, Biographie des célébrités militaires des armées de terre et de mer de 1789 à 1850, 1852

== Bibliography ==
- Le général Dagobert by Arthur Chuquet 1913
- Campagne de la Révolution française dans les P-O by J.-N. Fervel, chef de bataillon du Génie
- Nouveaux Lundis Tome 2 by Sainte-Beuve – 1864
- Notes et histoire de la Famille Dagobert by Mme Destors, née Hayaux du Tilly (1962) non édité
- Le Roi Dagobert. Histoire d'une famille et d'une chanson 1990, prix d'histoire de la société Académique de Nantes et de Loire-Atlantique
- Le général Dagobert by Christian Laroze – 2000
