= 6-inch howitzer =

A 6-inch howitzer is a howitzer with a 6 in (152.4 mm) bore. Examples include:

- BL 6-inch 26 cwt howitzer
- BL 6-inch 30 cwt howitzer
- 6 inch field howitzer M-1908

== See also ==
Category:155 mm artillery, for other weapons that could be described as "6-inch" howitzers
