= Saint-Laurent-de-Cerdans =

Saint-Laurent-de-Cerdans Sant Llorenç de Cerdans
- Commune
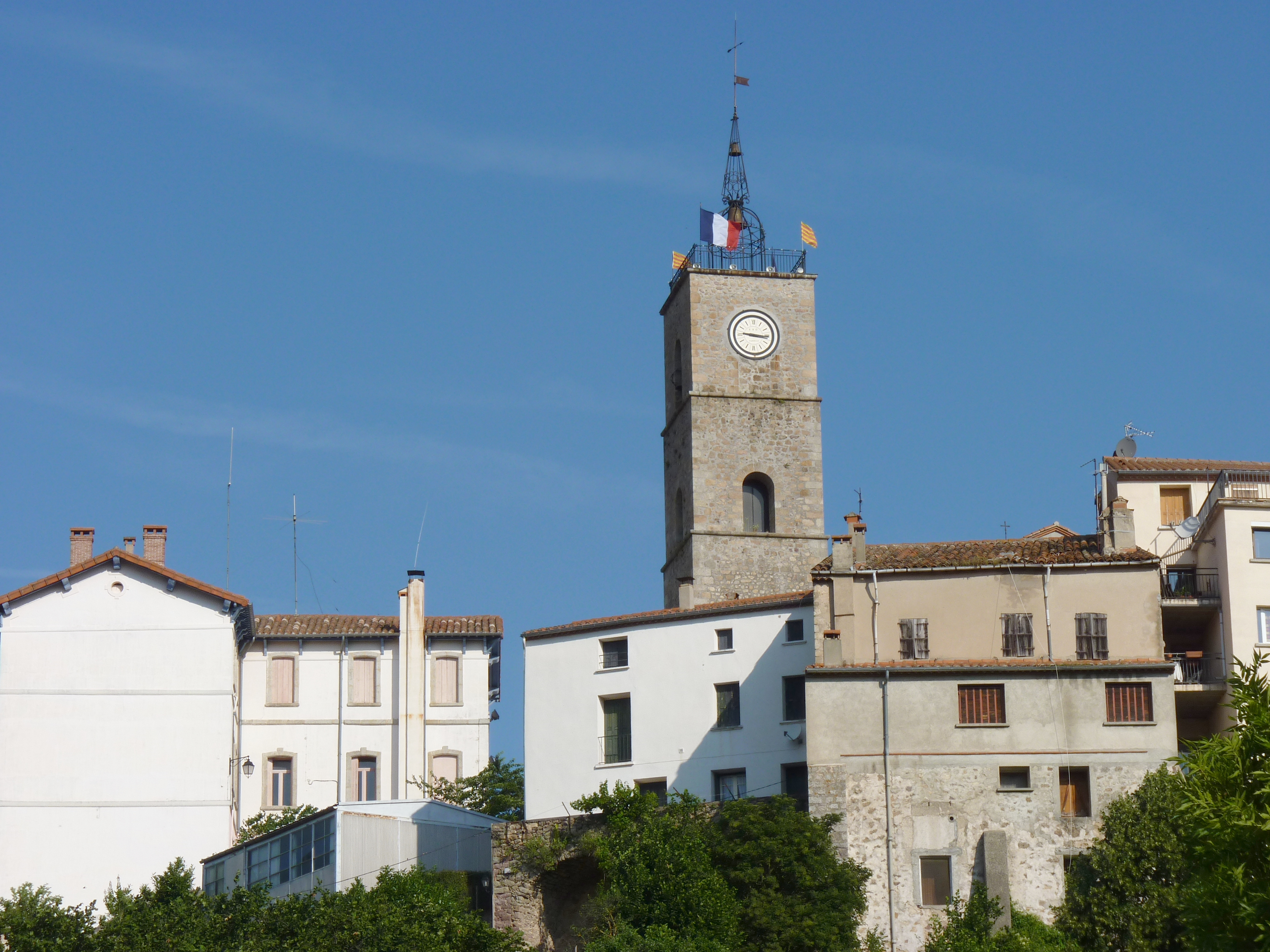
- The village and its church
- Location of Saint-Laurent-de-Cerdans
- Location within France Location within Occitanie
- Coordinates: 42°23′12″N 2°36′50″E
- Country: France
- Region: Occitania
- Department: Pyrénées-Orientales
- Arrondissement: Céret
- Canton: Le Canigou
- Intercommunality: Haut Vallespir

Government
  - Mayor (2020–2026): Louis Caseilles
- Area^{1}: 45.08 km^{2} (17.41 sq mi)
- Elevation: 675 m (2,215 ft)
- Highest elevation: 1,305 m (4,281 ft)
- Lowest elevation: 382 m (1,253 ft)
- Population (2023): 1,045
  - Density: 23.18/km^{2} (60.04/sq mi)
- Time zone: UTC+01:00 (CET)
  - Summer (DST): UTC+02:00 (CEST)
- INSEE/Postal code: 66179 /66260
- ^{1} French Land Register data, which excludes lakes, ponds, glaciers > 1 km^{2} (0.386 sq mi or 247 acres) and river estuaries.

Saint-Laurent-de-Cerdans (French pronunciation: [sɛ̃ lɔʁɑ̃ də sɛʁdɑ̃]; Catalan: Sant Llorenç de Cerdans) is a commune in the Pyrénées-Orientales department in southern France.

== Geography ==
Saint-Laurent-de-Cerdans is located in the canton of Le Canigou and in the arrondissement of Céret.

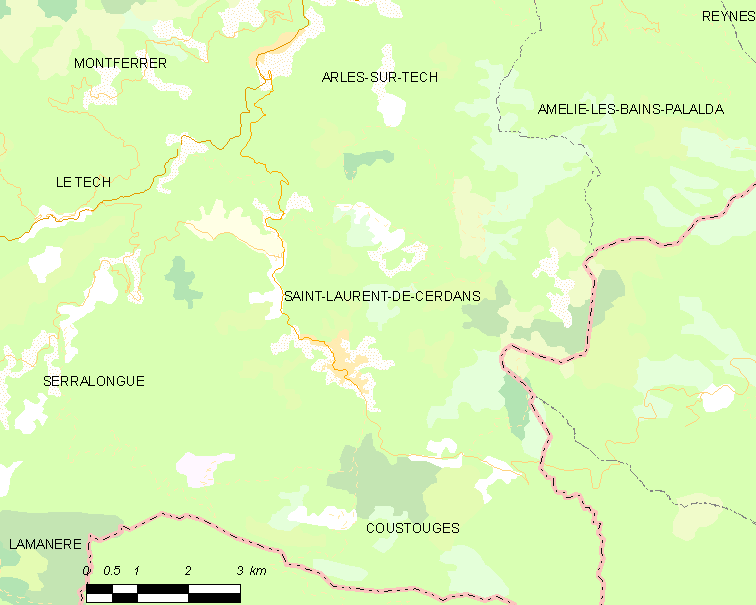
Map of Saint-Laurent-de-Cerdans and its surrounding communes

== Government and politics ==
=== Mayors ===
Mayor	Term start	Term end
Jacques Roitg	2008	2014
Louis Caseilles	2014	

== Population ==
Historical population
Year	Pop.	±% p.a.
1968	1,992	—
1975	1,807	−1.38%
1982	1,607	−1.66%
1990	1,489	−0.95%
1999	1,218	−2.21%
2007	1,288	+0.70%
2012	1,204	−1.34%
2017	1,098	−1.83%
2023	1,045	−0.82%
Source: INSEE

== Culture ==
Aleksandra Fontaine opened a gallery in the village.

== See also ==
- Communes of the Pyrénées-Orientales department
