= Siege of Antwerp =

Siege of Antwerp may refer to:

- Fall of Antwerp, a 1584–1585 siege of Antwerp conducted by Spanish forces against a Dutch garrison during the Eighty Years' War
- Siege of Antwerp (1789-1790), conducted by the Belgian Patriot army against the Austrians during the Brabant Revolution.
- Siege of Antwerp (1792), conducted by French forces against an Austrian garrison during the War of the First Coalition
- Siege of Antwerp (1814), conducted by Allied forces against a French garrison during the War of the Sixth Coalition.
- Siege of Antwerp (1832), conducted by French forces against a Dutch garrison after the Ten Days' Campaign.
  - The Siege of Antwerp, an 1840 painting by Horace Vernet depicting the 1832 siege
- Siege of Antwerp (1914), conducted by German forces against a Belgian and British garrison during World War I.

== See also ==
- The Sack of Antwerp (1576), a Spanish Fury conducted during the Eighty Years' War.
- The Bombardment of Antwerp (1830), when the Dutch started bombarding Antwerp during the Belgian Revolution
- The Capitulation of the Citadel at Antwerp, an 1837 painting by Henri Félix Emmanuel Philippoteaux
