= David Hendrik Chassé =

Dutch army officer (1765–1849)

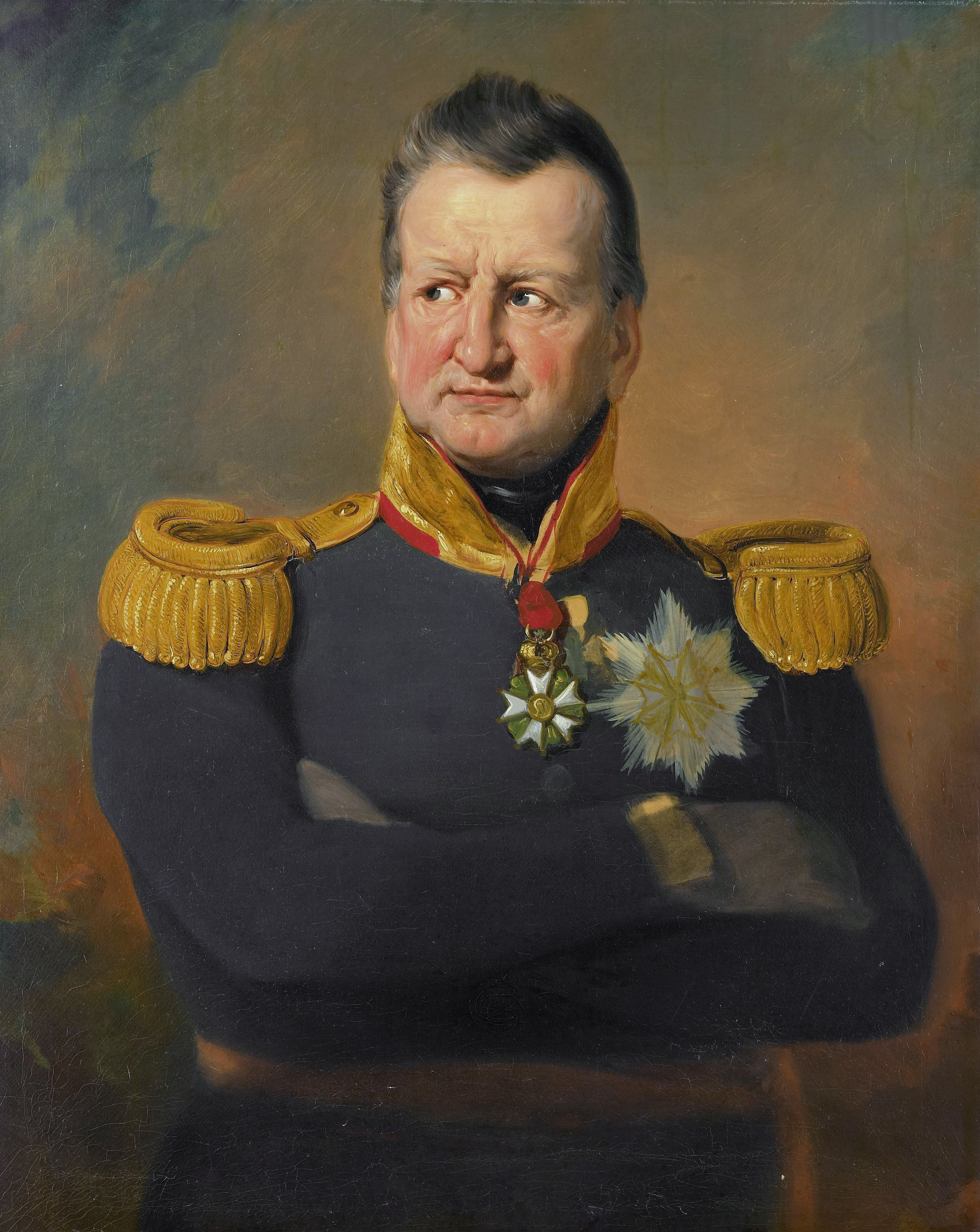
- General David Hendrik Chassé by Jan Willem Pieneman
- Born: 18 March 1765; Tiel, Dutch Republic
- Died: 2 May 1849 (aged 84); Breda, Netherlands
- Burial place: Ginneken
- Military career
- Allegiance: United Kingdom of the Netherlands
- Branch: Infantry
- Service years: 1775–1839
- Rank: General
- Commands: Dutch brigade, Division-Leval; Third Netherlands Division; Dutch Mobile Army in Belgium; Citadel of Antwerp
- Conflicts: Fourth Anglo-Dutch War; Prussian invasion of Holland; War of the First Coalition; Battle of Menin; Battle of Mouscron; Battles of Hooglede; War of the Second Coalition; Battle of Callantsoog; Battle of Krabbendam; Battle of Bergen; Battle of Alkmaar; Battle of Castricum; Napoleonic Wars; War of the Third Coalition; Napoleon's planned invasion of the United Kingdom; Peninsular War; Battle of Zornoza; Battle of Mesas de Ibor; Battle of Talavera; Battle of Almonacid; Battle of Ocaña; Battle of Vitoria; Battle of Maya; War of the Sixth Coalition; Battle of Arcis-sur-Aube; Hundred Days; Battle of Waterloo; Belgian Revolution; Bombardment of Antwerp; Ten Days Campaign; Siege of Antwerp
- Awards: Knight's Grand Cross Military William Order

David Hendrik, Baron Chassé (18 March 1765 – 2 May 1849) was a Dutch army officer who fought both for and against Napoleon. He commanded the Third Netherlands Division that intervened at a crucial moment in the Battle of Waterloo. In 1830 he bombarded the city of Antwerp as commander of Antwerp Citadel during the Belgian Revolution.

== Biography ==
=== Family life ===
Chassé was the son of Carel Johan Chassé, a scion of an old Huguenot family, who was a major in the army of the Dutch Republic, and of Maria Johanna Helena Schull, and the younger brother of Petrus Theodorus Chassé. He married Johanna Adriana van Nieuwenhoven on 10 November 1786 and divorced her in 1795. His second marriage was to the English widow Elisabeth Irish on 12 April 1796. They had one son. This marriage also ended in divorce in 1816.

=== Early career ===
Chassé entered the Dutch army as a ten-year-old cadet in his father's regiment in the Dutch States Army in 1775. He was promoted to second lieutenant in 1781 and in 1787 to captain. He resigned his commission in 1787 because of his sympathy for the Patriots in their opposition to the autocratic regime of stadtholder William V, Prince of Orange. Instead he became a captain in a Patriot Free Corps, defending Muiden and Weesp against the Prussian invaders that restored William to power in 1787. Because of this role in the revolt he had to go into exile in France, as many other Patriots. Another reason for going abroad was that he had killed a man in a duel.

In 1788 Chassé received a commission as a first lieutenant in the royal French army. After the revolution of 1789 he took part in the campaigns of the revolutionary French armies, during the War of the First Coalition, in 1793 as a captain in the Légion franche étrangère (Free foreign legion), where he led the 1st company chasseurs à pied. He took part in the invasion of the Dutch Republic with Dumouriez in February 1793. Chassé was promoted to lieutenant-colonel in November, 1794, and made commander of the 3rd battalion chasseurs, which was part of the Brigade-Daendels. He received a wound in the right upper arm in 1794 that would make writing difficult for the rest of his life. Chassé's battalion formed the vanguard of Daendel's attack on the Bommelerwaard and the capture of Zaltbommel, shortly before the fall of the Dutch Republic in January 1795.

=== Batavian Republic and Kingdom of Holland ===
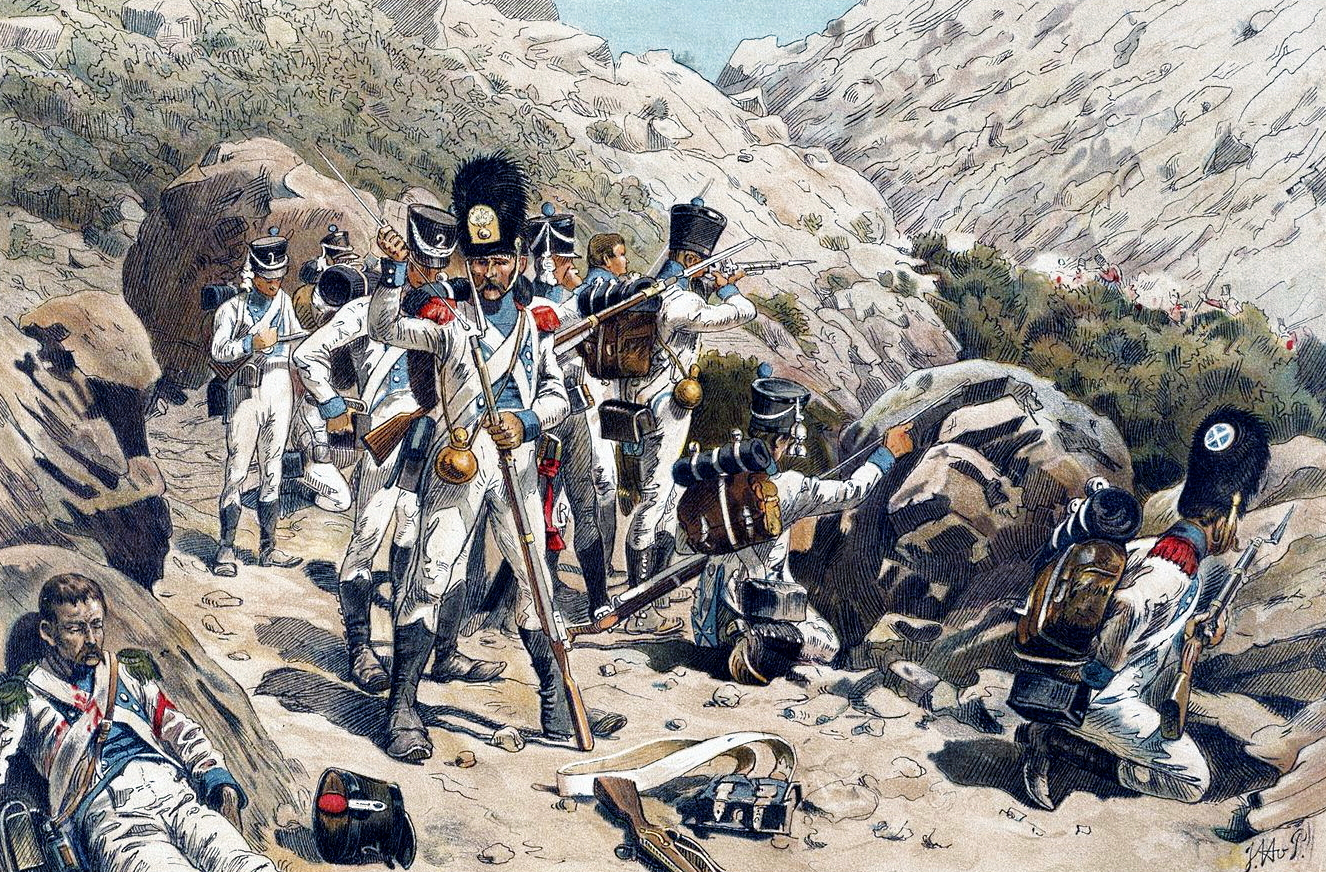
The Dutch Brigade in action during the Peninsular War

Chassé now entered the service of the Batavian Republic on 8 July 1795, with the rank of lieutenant-colonel as commander of the 2nd battalion Jagers. As such he took part in the Rhine campaign of 1796, under Daendels to support Kléber. He usually performed garrison duties, but was with his Jagers in 1799 part of the Franco-Batavian army that countered the Anglo-Russian invasion of Holland. In 1800 he commanded battalions that took part in the French campaigns in northern Germany. He was mentioned in dispatches at the siege of Würzburg. He was promoted to colonel in 1803 and to major-general in 1806 under the Kingdom of Holland.

King Louis Bonaparte put him in command of the Dutch brigade (part of the Division-Leval) that his brother Napoleon obliged him to contribute to the French campaign in Spain in 1808. For his exploits in that harsh guerilla war in the battles of Zornoza, Mesas de Ibor (1809), Talavera (1809), Almonacid (1809) and Ocana (1809; where he assumed command of the Division-Leval), King Louis created Chassé baron on 1 July 1810, just one week before Napoleon annexed the Kingdom of Holland to the French Empire. Like many Dutchmen, Chassé resented this annexation, so much so, that he refused to accept the diplome in which Napoleon elevated him to baron de l'Empire on 30 June 1811. Nevertheless, he continued serving in the army that now became part of the imperial French army.

=== French army service ===
He was now made a général de brigade in that French army, (Note: This was not a demotion as the army of the Kingdom of Holland did not have the rank of brigadier-general. A Dutch major-general was therefore equivalent to a French général de brigade. Likewise, when it came to divisions we see later that Dutch divisions of the time were commanded by lieutenant-generals, whereas the rank of major-general for a divisional commander would otherwise appear more appropriate.) serving in the army corps of Jean-Baptiste Drouet, Comte d'Erlon in Spain. As such he fought in the Battle of Vitoria and the Battle of Maya, where he saved the French army. For this feat he was made an officer in the Légion d'honneur and nominated by d'Erlon for promotion to lieutenant-general in the imperial army. Napoleon affectionately called him "général baionette" for his fierceness and his predilection for bayonet attacks.

In 1814 Chassé was transferred to the Champagne theatre of war where he joined the Division Boyer as commander of its 2nd Brigade. He fought in the battles of Bar-sur-Aube and Arcis-sur-Aube, where he was wounded. He directed the defense of Sens on 3 April 1814. However, after the fall of Paris and Napoleon's first abdication he had had enough and asked to be released from French service. This was granted with the rank of lieutenant-general on 6 October 1814.

He now returned to the Netherlands which had become independent again. The sovereign prince William I of the Netherlands was keen to engage the services of such an experienced general, and had no doubts about his loyalty. Chassé was commissioned as a major-general in the new Mobile Netherlands Army on 22 October 1814. He was made commander of the Third Netherlands Division on 25 March 1815 and promoted to lieutenant-general on 21 April.

=== Battle of Waterloo ===
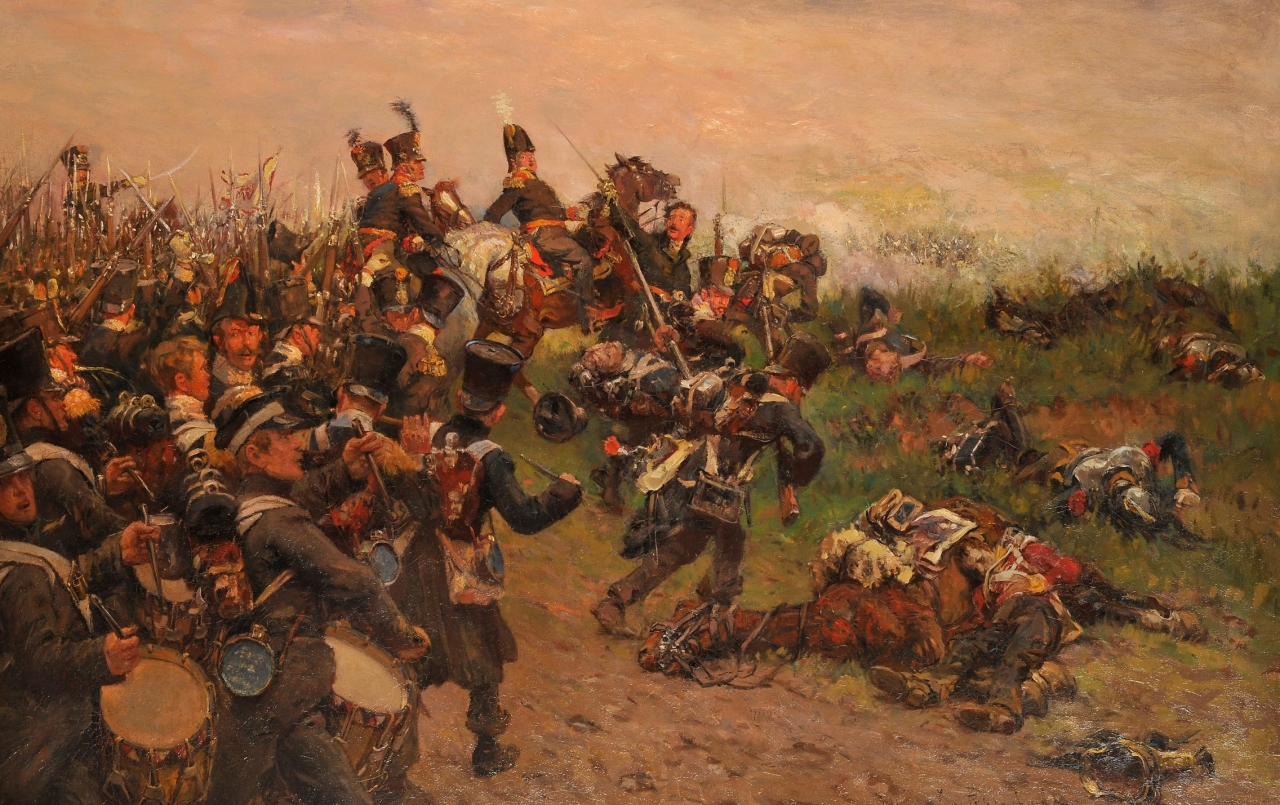
Chassé at the head of his division during the Battle of Waterloo by Jan Hoynck van Papendrecht

At the battle of Waterloo Chassé's third division was part of the First Netherlands Corps under the Prince of Orange in the right-center of the Duke of Wellington's Anglo-Allied army. As Wellington, who had often fought against Chassé in Spain, was still apprehensive about his military skill, (Note: In a confidential assessment of the Netherlands army of April 2, 1815, entitled "Memorandum relative to the Dutch Army," the anonymous drafter writes about Chassé: "Pourquois ne pas éloigner ces Généraux inutiles et dangereux, tel que M. Chassé, Storm de Grave, Matusowitz, gens sans moyens, et des plus mauvaises principes? … partout il seroit mieux, et moins dans le cas de faire du mal, que sur la frontière de la France, ou ils se trouvent actuellement." ('Why not remove these useless and dangerous Generals, such as Mr. Chassé, Storm de Grave, Matusowitz, people without means, and of the worst principles? ... anywhere it would be better, and less likely to do harm, than on the border of France, where they are currently located'.)) the third division was placed in and around the town of Braine l'Alleud, behind the right wing. However, Chassé was soon called up to move his division behind the center, as no further attacks were expected in that sector.

Around 7:30 pm, in the final part of the battle, Chassé noticed that the fire of the artillery in front of him slackened. In response he ordered Major Van der Smissen to send the Horse artillery battery commanded by Captain Carel Frederik Krahmer de Bichin into the firing line. It was at this moment that Napoleon sent his Imperial Guards to attack the center. In preparation for the second counterattack Chassé ordered the Detmers brigade (part of the division) to take position behind Van der Smissen. (Note: At this time the other brigade, of major-general Aubremé, was placed behind that of Detmers between the British Guards and the dragoons of Vandeleur in two grand echeloned squares.) His counterattack was to be a bayonet charge, as Chassé had a predilection for this type of manoeuvre (that had earned him the nickname of "général baionette" from Napoleon), and it proved to be decisive. (Note: General Lord Hill, commander of II Corps at Waterloo, gave Chassé full honors in his dispatch to Wellington of 20 June 1815, writing "I have also to mention the steady conduct of the 3rd Division of the troops of the Netherlands, under the command of Major-General (sic) Chassé, which was moved up in support of Major-General Adams' brigade to repulse the attack of the Imperial Guard...)

=== Belgian Revolution ===
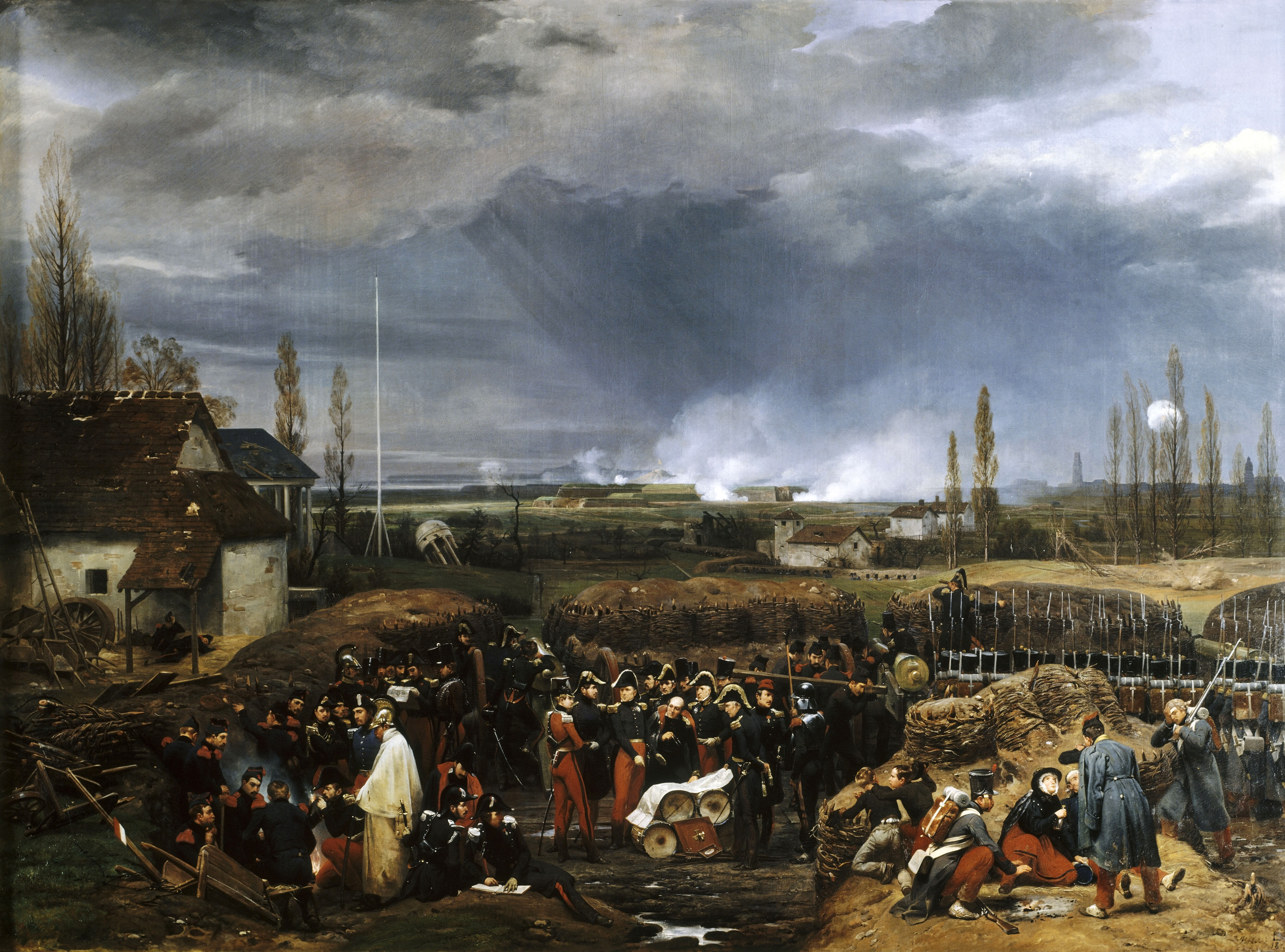
The Siege of Antwerp by Horace Vernet

After Waterloo Chassé was given several high commands. After the beginning of the Belgian Revolution he replaced Prince Frederick of the Netherlands as commander-in-chief of Dutch forces in Belgium on 17 October 1830. The next day he ordered the retreat to the fortified area around Antwerp. As commander of the citadel of Antwerp he ordered the bombardment of that city after an incident, the exact cause of which is still in dispute, on 27 October 1830. Whatever the provocation, the large loss of civilian life this bombardment caused seems hard to justify. The resentment it caused among Antwerp civilians helped lose Antwerp for the Dutch cause.

Nevertheless, the citadel remained in Dutch hands, and Chassé its commander. In 1832 (by now a full general) he commanded a garrison of 5,000 Dutch troops that was besieged by a French army under Marshal Gérard ten times that number. Despite this superiority, and the fact that the citadel was bombarded day and night by the French, the garrison held out for twenty-four days, before Chassé was finally forced to surrender. This earned him a knight's-grand cross in the Military William Order by promotion, and the admiration of the French, who made his imprisonment in Saint-Omer as pleasant as feasible. He was released as a prisoner of war in June 1833 and appointed governor of the fortress of Breda that same month.

After the peace with Belgium in 1839 Chassé finally retired. He was at first promised his full salary as a general for life, but this was reduced to the usual pension after government economies in 1841. King William I had appointed him a member for life of the First Chamber of the States-General in 1839 (which supplemented his income for a while), but after life memberships of that Senate were abolished by the constitutional reform of 1848 he lost that income also. He therefore had to sell his beloved horses.

Chassé died a few months later, aged 84. He was almost alone at his death, because his only son had predeceased him. His relatives declined a state funeral at his wish. He was laid to rest in Ginneken, now part of Breda, in a very simple burial.

== Memorial ==
- Chassé’s monument or ‘Citadelmonument’ in Ginneken, was erected on initiative of King William III in hounder of the fallen defenders of the 'citadel of Antwerp'. Aldo the general was initially buried at the back of the ‘Nederlandse Hervormde Kerk’ in Ginneken, on 5 May 1849, the remains of Chassé were brought over, 58 years later, to the crypt in front of the monument on 10 June 1907. By doing so the explicit wish of the general to be buried among his brothers in arms was granted.
- In the Amsterdam city district ‘De Baarsjes’ a street is named after him. The ‘Chasséstraat' is situated in the neighbourhood that later became the ‘Chassébuurt’. The church in the street officially is called the ‘Onze-Lieve-Vrouw van Altijddurende Bijstand’ (Our Lady of Perpetual Help) due to the length of this name the church is often referred to as ‘Chassékerk’.
- in the city of. Breda a square is named ‘Chasséveld’ (Chassé field, since it is a former field) and a part of the moat is called ‘Chassésingel’. The 1995 city theatre and connecting movie theatre are also named after him, respectively, Chassé Theater and Chassé Cinema.
- In his birth place Tiel the former theatre also was called Chassé Theater as well as the shooting association and a street.
- The Chasséstraat in Den Haag is situated west of the centre.

== Sources ==
- Aa, A. J. van der, ed. (1858). "Braam, Jacob Andries van". Biografisch Woordenboek der Nederlanden.Deel 3 (DBNL) (in Dutch). pp. 322–328.
- Bas, F. de; De T'Serclaes de Wommersom, J. (1908). La campagne de 1815 aux Pays-Bas d'après les rapports officiels néerlandais. Tome II : Waterloo (in French). Paris: Librairie Plon.
- Blok, P.J.; Molhuysen, P.C., eds. (1930). "Chassé, David Hendrikus (by Koolemans Beijnen)". Nieuw Nederlandsch biografisch woordenboek (DNBL) (in Dutch). Sijthoff. pp. 270–278.
- Gabriëls, A. J. C. M. "David Hendrik Chassé 1765-1849, Legerofficier". Biografisch Woordenboek Gelderland (in Dutch).
- Mullié, Charles (1852). "Chassé (David-Henri, baron de)" . Biographie des célébrités militaires des armées de terre et de mer de 1789 à 1850 (in French). Paris: Poignavant et Compagnie.
- Van Uythoven, Geert (2017). "David Hendrik Chassé" (PDF) (in Dutch). Archived from the original (PDF) on 22 August 2017.
- van Uythoven, Geert. "Horse Artillery Officers of the Netherlands Serving from 1813 to 1815: Smissen, Jacques-Louis-Dominique, Baron van der". Napoleon Series.
- Wellington, A. W. (1863). Supplementary Despatches and Memoranda of Field Marshal Arthur, Duke of Wellington, K. G. Vol. 10.
