= Dutch Brigade (Peninsular War) =

Hollandse Brigade (Dutch Brigade)
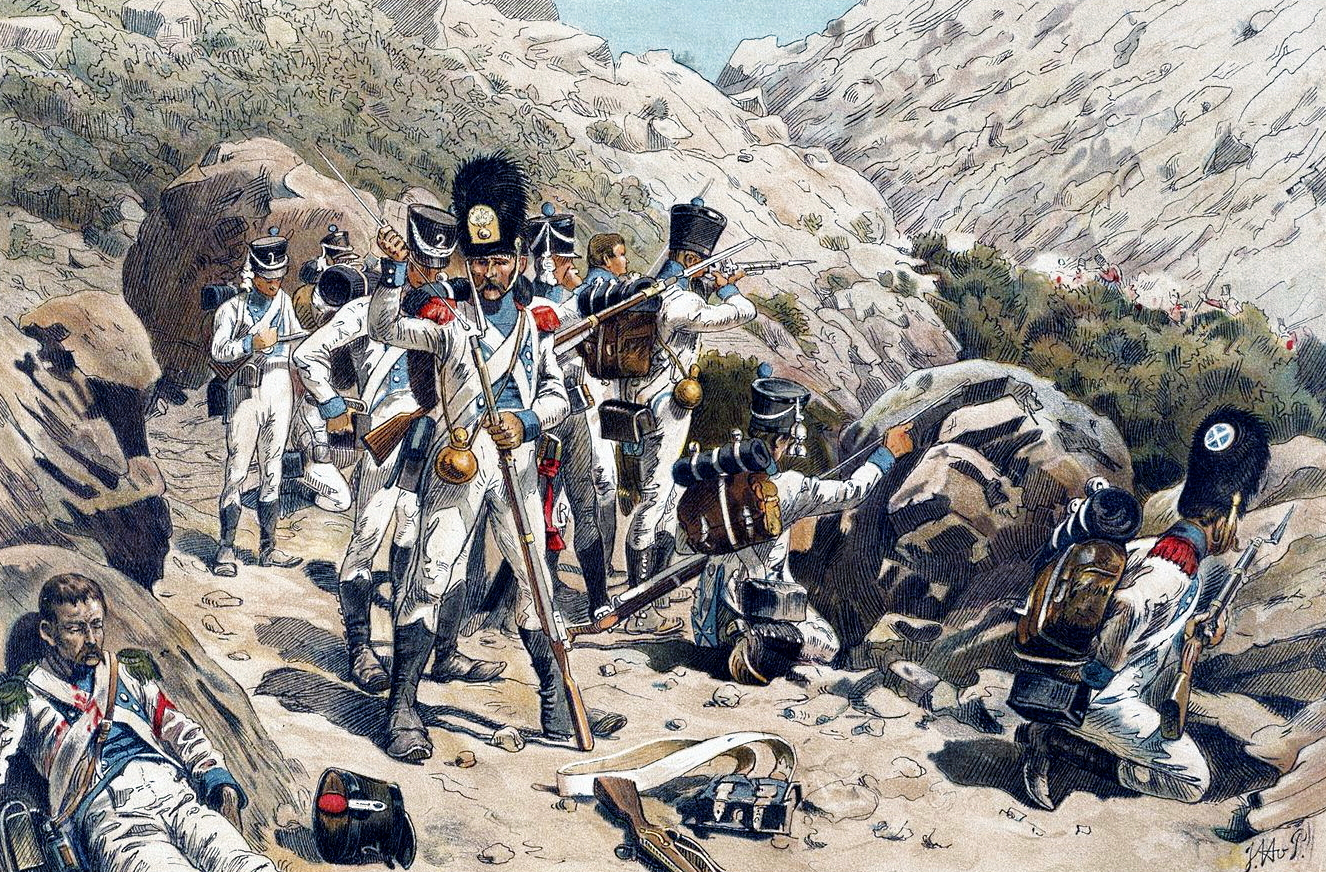
- Illustration of the Dutch Brigade in action by Jan Hoynck van Papendrecht
- Active: 1808–1810
- Country: Kingdom of Holland
- Branch: Army of the Kingdom of Holland
- Type: Combined arms
- Role: Infantry
- Size: 3,000
- Engagements: Battle of Zornoza; Combat of Mesas de Ibor; Battle of Medellin; Battle of Talavera; Battle of Almonacid; Battle of Ocaña

Commanders
- Notable commanders: David Hendrik Chassé

The Dutch Brigade (Dutch: Hollandse Brigade) was a formation of the army of the Kingdom of Holland. King Louis Bonaparte sent the brigade in September 1808, to take part in the Peninsular War on the French side at the request of his brother Emperor Napoleon of France. The brigade was under the command of Major-General David Hendrik Chassé and was made part of the so-called "German Division" which consisted of units from the Nassau, the Baden and other German allies of the French empire, commanded by the French general Leval. It was, in turn, part of the French Army's IVth Corps commanded by Marshals Lefebvre and Sébastiani, and was later part of the Marshal Victor's Ist Corps.

The brigade distinguished itself initially in several major battles, and was later employed mainly in counter-guerrilla warfare. After the annexation of the Kingdom of Holland by the French empire in 1810, the brigade was formally decommissioned and its members, now French subjects, absorbed into the French 123rd Line Infantry Regiment, and later into the 130th Line Infantry Regiment. The other battalions of the 123rd remained in the Netherlands and were later reassigned to the Russian campaign of 1812.

== Formation of the Brigade ==
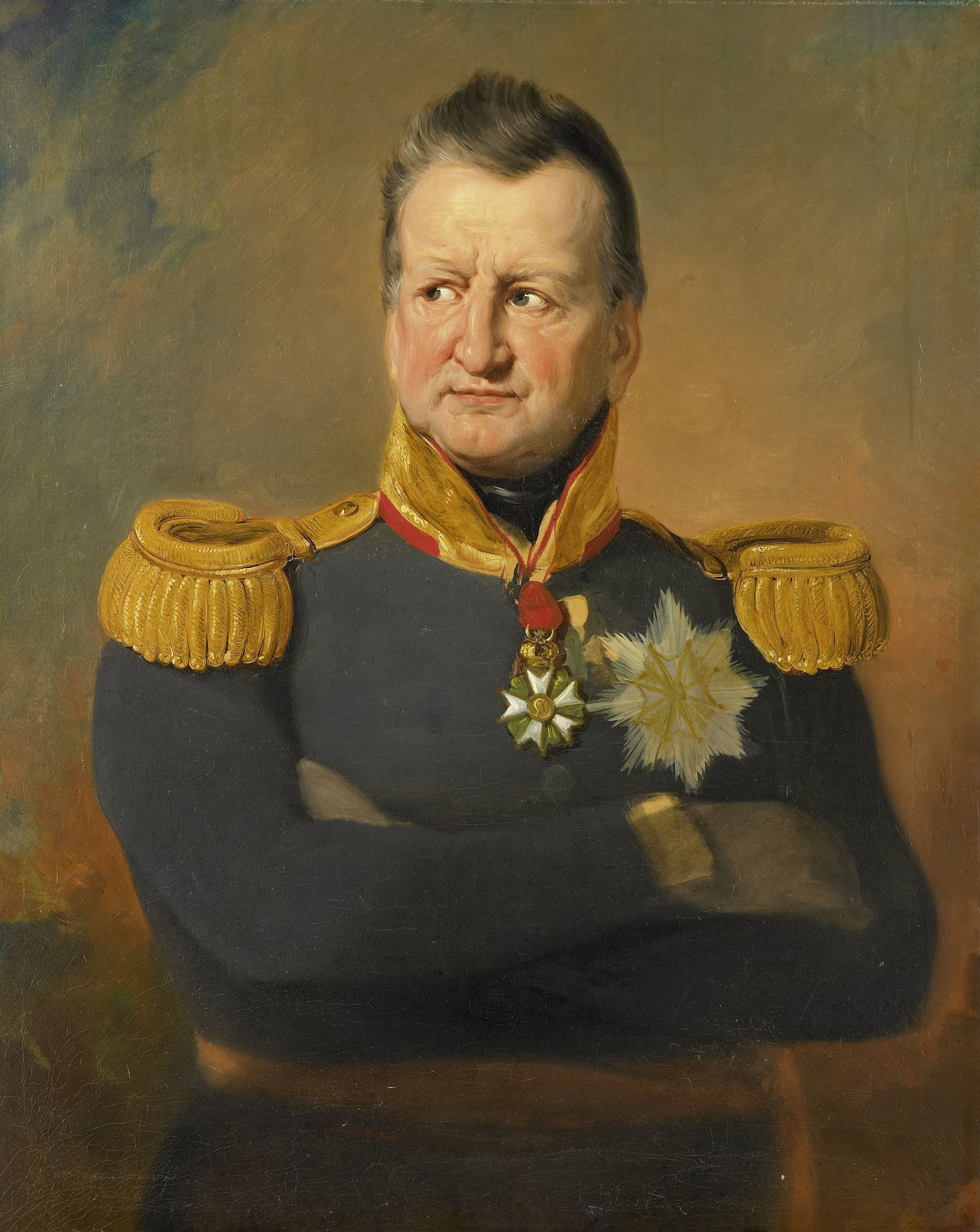
David Hendrik Chassé in 1832

On 17 August 1808, Emperor Napoleon of France sent a peremptory demand to his brother, King Louis of Holland, to furnish a brigade for service in the campaign in Spain. The brigade was to include a cavalry regiment of 600 horses, a company of artillery with three guns and three howitzers, three battalions of infantry with a total of 2,200 men, and a detachment of miners and sappers, for a grand total of 3,000 men. The brigade was to consist of veteran soldiers and was to march within ten days of receipt of the demand. Despite being the Emperor's brother, King Louis did his best to defend the interests of his kingdom, often dragging his feet when it came his brother's demands. Nevertheless, with this request he found it politic to comply immediately, despite the fact that the Dutch army (about 22,000 men) had already sent 6,000 men to Germany. The Minister of War, General Janssens, and the Commander-in-Chief, Marshal Dumonceau, recommended Major-General David Hendrik Chassé as commander of the newly created brigade. Chassé's staff consisted of Colonel A. Lycklama à Nijeholt as commander of the infantry; Major F. F. C. Steinmetz as commander of the artillery, and sappers; Colonel O. F. von Goes as commander of the cavalry (later Colonel Van Merlen); Captain H. R. Trip as commander of a company of horse artillery; and a field ambulance under command of surgeon G. Sebel. Lieutenant-Colonel Vermeulen would serve as chief of staff, assisted by captain of horse Van Zuylen van Nijevelt.

Organising the brigade proved difficult. Initially, the first battalion of the 3rd regiment of Jagers, encamped in the province of Zeeland, was selected to form the core of the brigade. But it turned out that the regiment was so stricken by "Zeeland fever" (probably malaria (Note: Which would in 1809 also bring the British invasion of Zeeland, known as the Walcheren Campaign, to an untimely end.)) that most of its members were unfit for duty. The army leadership therefore had to replace this battalion with the 2nd battalion of the 4th regiment of the line, commanded by Lieutenant-Colonel C. L. von Pfaffenrath. The other infantry battalion designated to the brigade, commanded by Lieutenant-Colonel A. W. Storm de Grave, came from the 2nd regiment of the line in Groningen. Problems with equipment and lack of basic supplies, including shoes, also delayed the deployment of the brigade. On the other hand, the cavalry, four squadrons of the 3rd regiment of hussars, was available immediately. These 2,200 troops, short of the requested 3,000, eventually concentrated near Bergen op Zoom to march to France on 2 September 1808. It was promised that the lacking 800 would follow later. (Note: An interesting question is what nationalities were represented in the brigade. The fact that conscription had not been introduced at this time, (this would only happen in 1811), makes it likely that an appreciable number of the soldiers would not have been Dutch nationals, because the army of the Kingdom of Holland, like its predecessors, the Dutch States Army and the army of the Batavian Republic, was forced to make extensive use of foreign mercenaries. Unfortunately, the regimental rolls are lacking, both in the Dutch Nationaal Archief and the French archives of the SHAT at Vincennes; cf. Moor and Vogel, p. 205.) On 1 September part of the infantry rioted because of arrears in pay. The government hastily arranged an advance, which restored the peace. The brigade was sent off on 2 September by Marshal Dumonceau personally.

== History of the Brigade ==
=== The march to Spain ===
Since transport by sea was impossible due to the blockade by the Royal Navy, the brigade had to march all the way to Spain, a distance of over 2,000 kilometres. The troops first marched to Paris, by way of Antwerp, Ghent, Lille, and Amiens. Although French authorities had promised support, it turned out that none of the local authorities had been made aware that they were to provide food and shelter. The Dutch quartermaster, (Note: Romar was actually a civilian from the Ministry of War with the official title of "commissioner of war," but his tasks were comparable to those of a quartermaster; cf. Moor and Vogel, p. 49.) O. J. Romar, was often fobbed off by the local French commanders and had to organize victualling himself. This depleted his war chest. Soldiers often had to buy food themselves from their pay (three stuivers a day), a sum which could not provide adequate sustenance. Hunger and fatigue caused a growing stream of stragglers. The younger officers began to criticise Chassé openly.

The brigade arrived in Saint-Denis near Paris on 19 September. By this time its strength was 2,130 men and 846 horses. Chassé complained to Kingdom of Holland Minister Janssens about the lack of support he had received. The Minister instructed the Dutch ambassador in Paris, Admiral Verhuell, to press the French authorities to fulfil their obligations, and pay the promised advances through the Paris bankers Audenet and Slingeland. On 20 September, the brigade paraded before Queen Hortense de Beauharnais, King Louis' estranged wife. The next day Emperor Napoleon honored the brigade with an inspection with Marshal Lefebvre. Napoleon used the occasion to change the organisation of the infantry battalions reducing their nine companies to six, thereby beefing up the strength of the individual companies. He also decreed that the brigade would become part of the German division, composed of troops from a number of German states that were allied with the French Empire commanded by General Leval. The German division was to become part of IV Corps under the command of Marshal Lefebvre. Finally, Napoleon organised two depots, one for the infantry in Saint-Denis, and another for the cavalry in Versailles, where stragglers and sick personnel (208 men, among whom was Major Steinmetz) were to be collected for eventual transfer to their units in Spain.

The brigade left Paris for Bayonne near the Spanish border on 22 September, marching via Chartres, Le Mans, Saumur, Niort and Bordeaux. On this leg of their march, the reception by the local population was much better and the troops were treated on a par with French troops. The brigade arrived in Bayonne on 24 October. The city had been the staging point for the French invasion of Spain, and was now full of troops. Thanks to the efforts of Quartermaster Romar, the French were persuaded to provide new uniform coats and shoes. At this point the strength of the brigade had shrunk to 1,700 men. (Note: This number would be replenished by reinforcements the Dutch government sent in November and December of about 800 men under command of Colonel Alberti and Captain C. van Stapele.; cf. Moor and Vogel, pp. 70–72.) The remaining soldiers were the stronger men; the march having eliminated the weaker troops. Common experiences had forged a sense of comradeship among the troops. When the brigade entered Spain the brigade had to fend for itself in competition with French and allied units for food and shelter. The brigade leadership for the first time was confronted by the dangers posed by the Spanish guerrillas (usually called "brigands" by the French), who continually preyed on the French supply lines. Marching to Bilbao by way of Irun, Tolosa, Mondragon and Durango; the brigade arrived at Bilbao around the end of October 1808.

=== Durango (31 October 1808) ===
Almost immediately after the brigade's arrival on Spanish soil, Marshal Lefebvre took away General Chassé's miners, sappers, cavalry and artillery. Chassé's protests were ineffective, despite the orders by King Louis to keep the brigade together. The combat engineers disappeared without a trace. It later turned out that they had been ordered to improve the defences of the citadel of Burgos. They did this although Captain Lambert was forced to pay them from his own purse. The engineers would later destroy the citadel in a rear-guard action on 10 May 1811, just before the British could enter it. The hussars were integrated into a cavalry brigade attached to the division of General Sébastiani.

The infantry battalions, the Nassau regiments, forming the core of the brigade, were assigned to Leval's division and would be the only ones to carry the honour of the brigade as a fighting unit. Besides the Dutch troops, the division consisted of the Baden regiment, the Hesse-Darmstadt regiment, a Frankfurt battalion, a battalion of Parisian guards, and two batteries of artillery. Together with Sébastiani's division and Villatte's division, Leval's division formed the IVth French Corps under the command of Marshal Lefebvre. The IVth corps was concentrated around Durango and its objective was to march on Bilbao and from there to Madrid.

To achieve the march on Bilbao and ultimately Madrid the Spanish army of General Blake first had to be defeated. The Spanish and French armies met at the Battle of Zornoza, near Durango, on 31 October 1808. The Dutch Brigade had been inspected by Marshal Lefebvre the previous day. The Dutch troops, among other foreign troops under the temporary command of General Villatte, attacked the Spaniards by moving uphill and, despite the difficult terrain, they first succeeded in driving the Spanish from the hillock of Bernagoitia, and then Nevera. There, the Dutch lit a fire to signal the French center (Sébastiani) and right wing (Leval) to start their advance. General Chassé subsequently led the pursuit of the fleeing Spaniards. In passing, Dutch voltigeurs slaughtered a flock of sheep, grazing in a wood; they appreciated the meat after going without for a long time. The Dutch troops received much praise for their actions in battle; Chassé was awarded the Legion of Honour, and five other officers received a medal for bonne conduite et bravoure (good conduct and bravery).

After the battle, the French army pursued the Spanish, looting along the way. On 9 November, a few days after the battle of Valmaseda, the Dutch Brigade reached Valmaseda, while the town was being sacked in reprisal for the murder of three Frenchmen. After marching through the burning town, Dutch troops initially joined the looters, but were quickly brought under control. Captain Van Oudheusden, sabre drawn, rescued a few Spanish women from being raped by French grenadiers.

=== From Durango to Mesas de Ibor (17 March 1809) ===
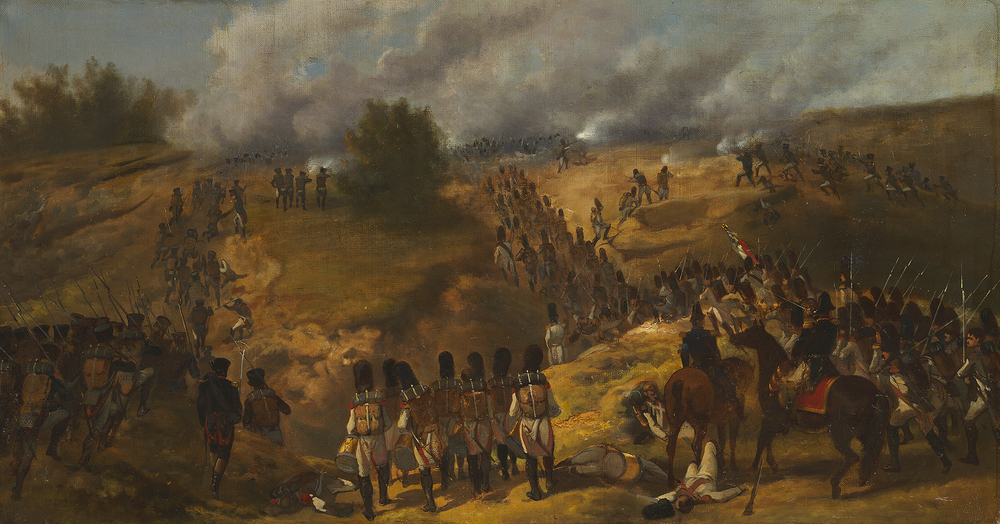
The attack of the Brigade at Mesas de Ibor

In the following months, the brigade was used mainly to perform guard and escort duties. Chassé was appointed military governor of Bilbao on 9 November and the brigade was tasked with occupation duties. Chassé led a reconnaissance force of 500 men in the coastal area west of Bilbao. On 14 December, he was recalled to lead the brigade to Madrid in the train of the 4th Corps. The march across high country was hard because an extremely cold winter had set in and foraging was difficult, because other troops had effectively looted everything of value, and the population had fled. Madrid was reached on New Year's Eve 1808.

The logistical problems that plagued the entire Iberian army, were felt even more keenly by the Dutch, as they were supplied only after the French needs were fulfilled. (Note: Chassé complained in early 1809 that Dutch soldiers were still waiting for their second pair of shoes, while French soldiers, who had served an equal length of time, had already received their third replacement. Cf. Moor and Vogel, p. 91.) The Dutch cavalry, in particular, had insufficient high quality fodder for the horses, and the horses often lost shoes due to the difficult terrain. Arriving at Bilbao, only 91 of 231 horses were fit for duty. The horse artillery lost so many horses that their caissons had to be drawn by three, instead of the usual six horses. Because the Dutch infantry used a different type of musket that could not use French ammunition, a shortage of ammunition soon occurred. The younger officers blamed Chassé for being insufficiently forceful in his representations to the French corps command, and they openly showed their displeasure making personal relations with the general difficult. Chassé subsequently removed a number of "difficult" officers, among them the chief-of-staff Vermeulen, who was replaced by Captain Van Zuylen van Nijevelt.

In Madrid, the entire German division was transferred to the I Corps under the command of Marshal Victor (who was married to a Dutch woman) in January 1809. The brigade received orders to guard one of the three bridges across the Tagus river, at El Puente del Arzobispo, where they arrived at the end of January. The Dutch hussars remained with the IV Corps, now commanded by General Sébastiani, and took part in, among others, the battle of Ciudad-Real (27 March 1809), at which Colonel Roest van Alkemade was mentioned in despatches.

Meanwhile, the Dutch infantry fortified the bridge at Arzobispo under the direction of engineer officers Van Schelle and De Boer, making it impassable. But the Corps command directed them to make the bridge passable again at the end of February. Chassé, aware that Spanish troops were nearby, formed a bridgehead on the "Spanish" side of the Tagus and had his troops patrol intensively from 19 to 23 February in the Sierra de Altamira to guard against guerrillas. The local guerrillas, about 10,000 in number, were mostly escaped prisoners of war, former soldiers of the army of General Venegas, who had been defeated by Marshal Victor at the Battle of Uclés (1809). The German division was tasked with suppressing their activity in the area beyond the Tiétar river.

This counter-guerrilla operation, the first of its kind in the Peninsular War, soon led to excesses. The Dutch Brigade became involved in a reprisal against the town of Arenas de San Pedro, where the inhabitants had murdered a number of Westphalian dragoons, and mutilated their bodies. The Germans were enraged and under the direction of Major Von Holzing, they sacked the town on 25 February 1809 during which not even infants were spared. To the horror of their own officers, Dutch soldiers also were involved in the carnage. The officers swore that they would never allow things to get out of hand like this again. Apparently they kept their word because as far as is known the atrocities at Arenas are the only ones in which the Dutch troops were involved during the war. (Note: It is less remarkable that the atrocities at Arenas occurred in a war that was rife with atrocities from both sides, or that German and Dutch troops took part in it, as in this era most military men would consider murder by civilians, especially women (as was the case in Arenas), of their comrades so heinous that almost anything was justified to exact revenge, but that Dutch officers were so shocked and shamed by the affair. Captain Van Zuylen van Nijevelt wrote in a letter home: "Sixty people have been killed, among whom women, children and greybeards. Pregnant women were not spared... [However], fourteen Frenchmen were butchered in this town, the regiment has avenged them in a horrible, unworthy and cruel manner... There is nothing so terrible, nothing so dreadful, as a soldier in these times. Our profession, the finest and noblest that exists, is so tarnished, that one hesitates to admit to being a soldier."; cf. Moor and Vogel, pp. 105–108.)

After the Second Siege of Zaragoza had ended with a French victory on 24 February 1809, Marshal Victor decided to attack the Spanish forces on the south bank of the Tagus, giving the German division a lead role in this attack. On 17 March 1809, the division encountered a strong Spanish force at Mesas de Ibor. General Leval first sent in the Nassau regiment against the ensconced Spaniards, but they were repulsed by heavy Spanish fire. Then Leval decided on a general attack on a broader front. The Dutch Brigade was in the center, flanked by the Baden regiment on the left, and the Hessen-Darmstadt regiment on the right. Chassé ordered a bayonet attack and the Dutch troops stormed the Spanish field works without firing a shot. Though the troops suffered from grapeshot and musket fire they did not waver. Miraculously, only ten Dutch soldiers were killed and 49 wounded in the hail of fire. The Spanish troops fled from the Dutch bayonets. The rest of the Spanish front at Almaraz collapsed and the French were able to advance across the Tagus.

=== Medellin, Talavera and Almonacid ===
The French now aimed to force the Spanish army to accept battle, which they did on 28 March at the Battle of Medellín. At this battle the only Dutch unit involved was the Dutch hussars, who were part of the cavalry attack that broke the Spanish line. After the battle, Major Steinmetz, tasked with collecting the weapons that had been thrown away, found more than 8,000 muskets. Following this battle, the Dutch infantry was kept in reserve and Chassé was appointed military governor of the province of Trujillo in the Extremadura region, whose capital is Trujillo. Although the Dutch were able to recuperate during this tranquil period, supplies for the troops were a problem, as the local population refused to cooperate. Quartermaster Romar therefore organized a military bakery and butchery, with Dutch bakers and butchers recruited from the ranks, to take care of the brigade's needs. Also, the paymaster received enough funds to pay the troops' arrears in pay. The relative calm caused some troops to feel the pangs of homesickness. Due to the deficient field post service, contact with home was sporadic. The soldiers did not receive many Dutch newspapers, which may have been just as well from the standpoint of morale. This precluded them from knowing that apparently nobody in the Netherlands was aware of, or cared, what was happening to them. Many soldiers and officers were pining for their homes and hoped that the brigade would soon be recalled or failing that, they themselves would be able to return home. Influential family members of some officers applied pressure to have their loved-ones recalled.

The French offensive soon stalled. In June 1809, the French position in Extramadura became untenable due to supply problems and disease among the troops. I Corps gave up its position and withdrew between 14 and 19 June behind the Tagus; the Dutch were again encamped near Talavera. The Spanish troops hastened to fill the gap. Generals Cuesta and Venegas threatened the French from two sides, while the British expeditionary force under General Arthur Wellesley threatened to encircle the armies. At the end of July 1809, the Spanish and British armies met the French at the Battle of Talavera. The Dutch Brigade, as part of Leval's division, bivouacked in an olive grove on the night of 27 July, the eve of the battle. The next day, initial attacks by the French on the British positions were repelled with heavy losses. Around noon there was a pause in the hostilities during which the French held a council of war. On the advice of Marshal Victor, the French decided not to wait for reinforcements from the corps of Marshal Soult, but to attack again in the afternoon. Leval's division attacked the British 4th division under General Alexander Campbell. The Dutch troops were repelled and pursued by the British guards, who in turn were repelled as well. Later that afternoon the King's German Legion twice counterattacked, but without result. The battle ended in a tactical draw, but the British retreated to Badajoz, rebuffing offers from the Spanish to pursue as they did not trust their allies to provide sufficient supplies. ·

The Dutch Brigade's losses at Talavera amounted to 31 killed and 146 wounded, with many wounds becoming septic. The surgeons did not improve the prospects of their patients by the use of bloodletting. Most wounds to limbs were treated, often unnecessarily, by amputation without anesthesia, to prevent wounds becoming gangrenous, which happened in many cases. Major Steinmetz (by now commander of the artillery of Leval's division), who had been ill for a very long time, died on the battlefield from complications of podagra.

After the battle of Talavera, the depleted infantry battalions, now re-organised as the 2nd Infantry Regiment, were reunited with the cavalry and artillery of the brigade. The battalions were again made part of the IV Corps, now commanded by the newly promoted Marshal Sébastiani. They marched to Toledo for rest and recuperation.

On 11 August 1809, the IV Corps left Toledo to cut off the advance of General Venegas to Madrid. The armies met at the Battle of Almonacid. The Spanish army, consisting of 23,000 men and about 8,000 horses, was drawn up in a line in front of the village. Venegas had positioned artillery on two steep hills, one of which, Los Cerrojones, covered the entire battlefield. To the left of the Spanish main force, an unknown number of soldiers hid in an olive grove. Sébastiani directed Leval's division (on the French right) to encircle Los Cerrojones. Meanwhile, the French artillery duelled its Spanish counterpart, while Polish and Dutch horse artillery attacked the Spanish detachment in the olive grove; leading to the retreat of the Spaniards. Sébastiani then attacked the Jaén and Bailén battalions on top of the hill. First, the Spaniards repelled the Polish infantry which took heavy losses. Sébastiani then ordered Chassé to make an enveloping movement, which was countered by Spanish cavalry. Leval's division quickly formed squares and repelled the Spanish cavalry, which suffered heavy losses. After this setback, the Spanish troops left their positions on the hill, leaving the main force without flanks. By this time, King Joseph Bonaparte having arrived on the scene with reinforcements for the French, Sébastiani then launched a general attack on the Spanish center with cavalry, supported by Trip's horse artillery, attacking on the Spanish right, while Chassé led the infantry against the Spanish left. Under the ensuing pressure, the Spanish troops retreated uphill where they formed a defensive line around their artillery. Despite the heavy fire of the Spanish guns, which caused major losses on the advancing French Army infantry, they kept advancing, and finally charged the Spanish line with their bayonets. There was a short man-to-man fight before the Spaniards fled in disarray. The Spanish lost ten standards and 26 guns, and thousands of their soldiers were taken prisoner of war. The Dutch hussars under Van Merlen (now in charge of the Dutch cavalry), took part in the pursuit and captured a great number of Spanish carts and mules. King Louis was so pleased with the Dutch contribution to the victory that he authorized that every year of service in the campaign in Spain would count double. Though the number of losses on the French side was large (2,400 killed and wounded), the Dutch Brigade only lost seven killed and 37 wounded.

=== Ocaña and counter-guerrilla warfare ===
After the battle of Almonacid there was a pause in the hostilities which the Dutch Brigade sorely needed. In October 1809, Chassé reported to the army command in The Hague that the brigade had lost nine officers and 815 men. However, after the reinforcements of early 1809, there was no prospect of additional manpower. On the contrary, the Netherlands itself was involved in war due to the British landing in Zeeland, and King Louis demanded the recall of the brigade to help defend the Fatherland. The French supreme command refused. The Dutch Brigade could not be released; the Kingdom of Holland would have to take care of its own defense. The Dutch army command at home, informed by private letters from officers in the brigade, had become dissatisfied with Chassé's policies and his "lack of firmness" in the face of French attempts to disperse the several units of the brigade. According to Minister of War Krayenhoff, this lack of resolve was, to a large extent, responsible for the low state of fitness of the brigade as many sick and wounded were lost to the brigade for all practical purposes. In February 1809 Krayenhoff had already warned that about 400 men had "disappeared" in this way. Chassé defended himself against the reproaches by pointing out that the King himself had ordered him to obey the French orders. In addition he asked for understanding of the difficult circumstances under which he had to work: supplies were lacking; clothing, shoes and medications were not available; and weakened soldiers were unable to keep up with the marching tempo. Asking rhetorically, "Which barbarian would lash these exhausted men forward?" Chassé also pointed out that the German units of Leval's division were even more depleted.

The pause in hostilities lasted only a few weeks. The Duke Del Parque defeated General Marchand at Tamames on 18 October 1809, and this made the Spanish Central Junta overconfident. They directed General Areizaga to march on Madrid from La Mancha with his army of 50,000. The French could not allow this, and on 9 November Marshal Soult ordered Polish hussars, reinforced by the horse artillery of Captain Trip, to occupy the town of Ocaña. On the way, at Dosbarrios, they met the Spanish cavalry and a fierce firefight ensued. The Poles and Dutchmen won, but the event was worrisome enough to the French command that it ordered all available units across the Tagus to stem the Spanish advance.

On 18 November, Chassé, ordered to march overnight with the Dutch Brigade and the Polish cavalry from Aranjuez to Ocaña, arrived at daybreak. There, Areizaga's army was already deployed across the plain. The Spanish army had 50,000 men (though they were very fatigued after their forced marches of the previous days); the French and allies had about 30,000. Marshal Soult was in command of the French with King Joseph observing. Soult's opening move was an assault by the French left wing, consisting of Polish, German and Dutch troops, on the Spanish right. However, the Spaniards anticipated this move and launched a frontal assault that drove the French allies back to Girard's division, behind them. The Spanish artillery fired over the heads of its own troops and caused many casualties in Leval's division. Many horses, including Trip's, were killed, hampering his batteries of horse-artillery. However, Leval's division managed to re-form and advance against the Spanish fire. Colonel Von Pfaffenrath, commander of the two Dutch battalions, led the advance in the first line of the troops. He was accompanied by the Dutch surgeons who helped the wounded as best they could; one surgeon, Jacobsen, was killed; another, Dieudonné, though severely wounded, continued to serve.

With General Leval wounded, General Chassé assumed command of the division. The allied soldiers managed to infiltrate the ranks of the Spanish infantry, and man-to-man fights ensued which put the Spaniards on the defensive. French artillery prevented the Spanish infantry from rallying, and they broke after Polish lancers took them in the flank. A general Spanish rout ensued, with many Spanish soldiers being killed by French and allied cavalry. Many others were taken prisoner after their flight was cut short by the French 1st Corps, which had not taken part in the battle, but had just crossed the Tagus. More than 14,000 Spanish soldiers surrendered. The German division was praised extensively by the French command. Marshal Sébastiani, in a speech to Chassé, was highly complimentary, especially of the Dutch artillerists. Trip was knighted with the Legion of Honour, and a number of Dutch officers were mentioned in dispatches. The Dutch brigade suffered relatively heavy casualties, with 82 killed and 89 wounded.

The large number of prisoners of war posed insurmountable problems for the French command. There was simply no way to feed them, and there was a good chance that Spanish guerrillas would attempt to liberate them. It was therefore decided to march the prisoners to France. The German division, now under Chassé's command, was given the task of escorting the transports. The Dutch Brigade departed on 26 November with 4,000 prisoners. The Nassau and Baden regiments had already left on previous days with other transports (in total, 10,000 prisoners). To escort the transports with entire regiments would seem unnecessary, but with the large number of guerrillas along the route, which went by way of Burgos and Vitoria to Bayonne, this was certainly necessary. The prisoners were in a very sorry state. They had been robbed of all their possessions and had hardly eaten during the week they had spent in Madrid. The transport became a true "death march" during which 2,000 of the 10,000 prisoners died. (Note: According to Costa de Serda, of the 3,300 prisoners arriving in the column, escorted by the Dutch Brigade, in Bayonne, no less than 2,219 were put in hospital right away; Cf. Costa de Serda, pp. 80–81.) This march was very distasteful to Chassé and his men, who pitied the poor wretches, but lacked the means to lessen their suffering. Accompanying the transport were several Dutch officers who had been recalled to the Netherlands. Among them was Captain Van Zuylen van Nijevelt who was replaced by the French Colonel Brenot as chief-of-staff. The column arrived to Bayonne on 28 December 1809.

In the first half of 1810, the Dutch brigade was tasked with counter-guerrilla warfare in La Mancha. The guerrillas were numerous and very successful at harassing French supply lines. They operated in large bands, led by legendary leaders like El Empecinado, and El Chaleco. French counter-measures were largely ineffective often because their troops alienated the population with their harshness. Every action by "brigands" led to reprisals against the civilian population of nearby settlements. This caused a spiral of atrocities and reprisals. Civilians, blinded by hatred, murdered isolated patrols, gallopers, and wounded soldiers if they had a chance. The Dutch brigade was generally unsuccessful, too, though Captain J. P. Sprenger, with a detachment of 100 men, defeated a troop of 900 Spanish irregular cavalry near Lerma on 24 January. However, a month later, a Dutch squad was ambushed in Segovia and disappeared without trace; only a few bandoliers were recovered. In mid-April 1810, Chassé established his headquarters in Almagro and managed to capture a flock of 15,000 merino sheep being driven to Portugal by guerrillas on orders of the Junta Central. In mid-June, he arrived with the severely depleted brigade (only 600 men, 260 horses and two guns were left) in Manzanares to fight the local guerrillas, but his troops were too exhausted to do anything noteworthy. However, a detachment under Lieutenant-Colonel Aberson occupied Villanueva de los Infantes and improvised a patrol base. When Aberson left with most of his men on one of those patrols, the local population attacked the remaining Dutchmen, who retreated to the local church. They were besieged for a few days until Chassé and Aberson relieved them. The Dutchmen plundered the church and citizenry in reprisal, leaving with two cart-loads of silver.

On 9 July 1810, the Kingdom of Holland was "reunited with" (i.e. annexed to) the French Empire by decree of Emperor Napoleon. This was followed by the abolition of the royal army and its units, like the Dutch brigade, on 16 July 1810. The infantry of the Dutch Brigade were absorbed into the 123rd French regiment of the line. The hussars, for the most part, had already returned to the Netherlands in February 1810. Their first task was to learn French, as their new officers could not speak Dutch. The miners and sappers became the sixth company of the French First Battalion of Miners. Some Dutch soldiers deserted. Chassé had a number of those deserters executed by firing squad (Note: The deserters were duly tried and convicted by the mobile court-martial that had been attached to the brigade since its formation. A question is which law they applied in this particular case. The commissaris-rapporteur (comparable to a judge-advocate) G. F. Blom was trained in Dutch military law, but after the Annexation French military law would have been applicable; Cf. Moor and Vogel, p. 50.) in front of the troops in September 1810, at which occasion he reminded the troops that despite the dissolution of the Kingdom and the army, they were still bound (as was he) by their oaths. ·

== Aftermath ==
Despite the dissolution of the brigade as a Dutch unit, the war, and the role of the Dutch soldiers in it, was not finished. The 123rd Regiment remained a preponderantly Dutch unit, even under the command of French officers. Chassé was put in charge of a French brigade. From December 1810 on, they were involved, unsuccessfully, in the hunt for the guerrilla leader El Chaleco, though there was some severe fighting with the guerrillas. During 1811, the troops left over from the 123rd Regiment in Spain were placed 'a la suite', meaning they were surplus, and could be re-designated. They were incorporated into either the 1st, 3rd or 6th Bataillon Auxiliaire de l'Armee du Nord, which were used to form the 130th French regiment of the line which continued to fight in Spain, being present at the Siege of Burgos in 1812, the fighting around Pamplona and in the Pyrenees in 1813, and at the Battle of Bayonne in 1814. By then, there were few Dutchmen left. As early as January 1812, only 800 Dutch infantrymen were left in Spain. Meanwhile, the other, newly formed battalions of the 123rd Regiment, augmented with new Dutch conscripts, became part of the army with which Napoleon invaded Russia in June 1812. There were no Dutch Peninsular veterans amongst those battalions, however. Some battalions of the 123rd Regiment became part of the Coutard Brigade in Merle's division of the II Corps, commanded by Marshal Oudinot. On 19 October 1812, it was part of the rearguard that covered the retreat of the Corps across the Dvina river at the Second Battle of Polotsk, where it so distinguished itself that "Polotsk" is one of the battle honors on the standard of the regiment. At the Battle of Berezina it again formed part of the rearguard that was sacrificed to cover the French retreat. At the beginning of the battle the regiment still had 100 men fit for duty; after the battle it no longer existed. "Berezina" is another of the modern French regiment's battle honors. Chassé, in the meantime, had been commanding French troops during the Battle of Vitoria and the Battle of Maya, and was recalled to fight in France in 1814, serving with distinction at the Battle of Bar-sur-Aube and the Battle of Arcis-sur-Aube.

All in all, only a few of the Dutch veterans of the Peninsular War returned to the Netherlands. Among the returnees was General Chassé who, despite his personal misgivings about the Annexation, had remained in French service in Spain. At first he was promoted sideways to général de brigade. (Note: At the time the army of the Kingdom of Holland did not have the rank of "Brigadier-General". This rank was only in 1952 inserted between the ranks of "Colonel" and "Major-General" in the organisation of the modern Dutch army. At the time a major-general commanded a brigade and a lieutenant-general commanded a division. These ranks shifted upwards later on. This may have introduced the misunderstanding of later historians that Chassé was demoted. This would be an anachronism, however. The equivalent ranks in the Grande Armée at the time were général de brigade and général de division respectively. It is true, however, that Napoleon thought his brother had allowed too much "grade inflation" in the royal army; Cf. Moor and Vogel, p. 35.) Chassé made rapid career steps because of his abilities, however, and ended up as a lieutenant-general. (Note: The rank of lieutenant-general was reintroduced for the rank of général de division on 16 May 1814, therefore after the coming to power of King Louis XVIII. This may explain a certain amount of confusion, as Chassé had already left French service by that time. Several French sources give the promotion as to "lieutenant-general" instead of général de division;Cf. C. Mullié, Biographie des célébrités militaires des armées de terre et de mer de 1789 à 1850, pp. 304–305 and Eugène Fieffé, Histoire des troupes étrangères au service de France depuis leur origine jusqu'à, nos jours, et de tous les régiments levés dans les pays conquis sous la première République et l'Empire: avec 32 gravures coloriées représentant plus de 80 types d'uniformes, Tome 2, Librairie Militaire Dumaine, 1854, p. 342, note 1. This may be explained as follows: the Dutch biographer of Chassé, Del Campo, writes: "Chassé traveled to Paris [in April 1814] to take care of his affairs and to ask to be released from French service. He was honorably discharged by the Minister for War, Marshal Soult, in a letter dated 6 December 1814, with the simultaneous promotion to the rank of lieutenant-general, and the expression of the highest satisfaction with the way he had served France"; Cf. Del Campo, p. 56.) After Napoleon's abdication he asked to be allowed to resign from the French service. He then offered his services to the new government of the Netherlands, which was only too happy to accept him. As a Dutch lieutenant-general, and commander of the Third Netherlands division, he played an important part at the Battle of Waterloo. Not surprisingly, he ordered a bayonet charge, which he led on horseback, with the Detmers Brigade, supposedly on the French Middle Guard, but possibly on troops of the brigade commanded by General Jean Pégot, in a decisive phase of the battle.

== See also ==
- Guerrilla warfare in the Peninsular War
