= Francisco Gómez de Terán y Negrete =

Spanish military officer

- Born: 13 April 1760; Madrid, Spain
- Died: 9 May 1816 (aged 56) Madrid, Spain
- Conflicts: American Revolutionary War; Great Siege of Gibraltar; Peninsular War; Battle of Medina de Rioseco; Battle of Zornoza; Combat of Mesas de Ibor; Battle of Talavera

Francisco de Paula Gómez de Terán y Negrete, 4th Marquis of Portazgo, also written as Portago, (Note: Most sources, including Oman, refer to the title as Portago. However, his biography at Real Academia de la Historia (Martín-Lanuza) uses Portazgo, as does the Spanish historian José Muñoz Maldonado (Muñoz Maldonado).) (1760–1816) was a Spanish military commander.

== Early career ==
As a cadet, he saw action during the Great Siege of Gibraltar.

== Peninsular War ==
At the start of the war, the Junta de Galicia promoted him to field marshal.

With Blake's Army of Galicia he fought at Rioseco (July 1808), his 4th Division numbered some 5,800 troops, almost half of whom were raw recruits.

The following September, Blake's Army of the Left moved on Bilbao, where Portazgo's 4th Division routed General Monthion's small garrison on 20 September 1808, the 4th Division stayed in the city for just under a week, withdrawing to the hills twenty miles away as Marshal Ney approached with two divisions. He again occupied the city, 11–24 October after having driven out General Merlin's division, before withdrawing again to fight at Zornoza.

In March 1809, now commanding the 3rd Division of Cuesta's Army of Extremadura, Portazgo fought at Mesas de Ibor and at Medellín, at the latter, with only three battalions, the remaining three having been left behind to garrison Badajoz.

At Talavera (July 1809), again forming part of Cuesta's Army of Extremadura, four battalions, (Note: According to Oman (1903), "Two of these four battalions were troops who had never been in action before: the other two had been badly cut up at Medellín, and brought up to strength by the incorporation of a great mass of recruits".) of the six that made up his 3rd Division, stampeded at the start of the battle.

In October 1809, he was appointed second-in-command of Blake's Army of Catalonia. Following Blake's resignation, he took interim command of that army and also became Captain General of Catalonia from mid-November to January 1810, when he resigned his command due to bad health.
