= Antwerp Citadel =

Dutch bastion fort (1567–1881)

Coordinates: 51.208425°N 4.392739°E

- Antwerp
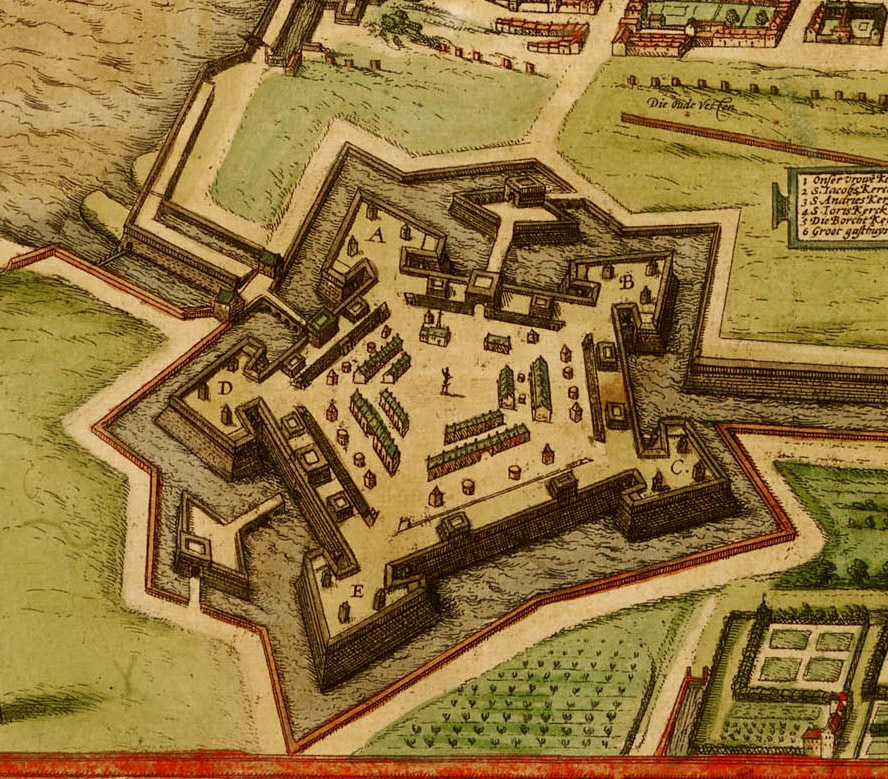
- Detail from the view of Antwerp in Georg Braun and Frans Hogenberg, Civitates orbis terrarum (1572)

Site information
- Type: bastion fort
- Owner: Habsburg Netherlands, Dutch Republic, Spanish Netherlands, Austrian Netherlands, United Belgian States, French First Republic, First French Empire, United Kingdom of the Netherlands, Kingdom of Belgium

Site history
- Built: 1567
- In use: 1881
- Fate: demolished
- Battles/wars: Sack of Antwerp (1576), Fall of Antwerp (1585), Siege of Antwerp (1814), Siege of Antwerp (1832)

Antwerp Citadel (Spanish: Castillo de Amberes, Dutch: Kasteel van Antwerpen) was a pentagonal bastion fort built to defend and dominate the city of Antwerp in the early stages of the Dutch Revolt. It has been described as "doubtlesse the most matchlesse piece of modern Fortification in the World" and as "one of the most studied urban installations of the sixteenth century".

== History ==
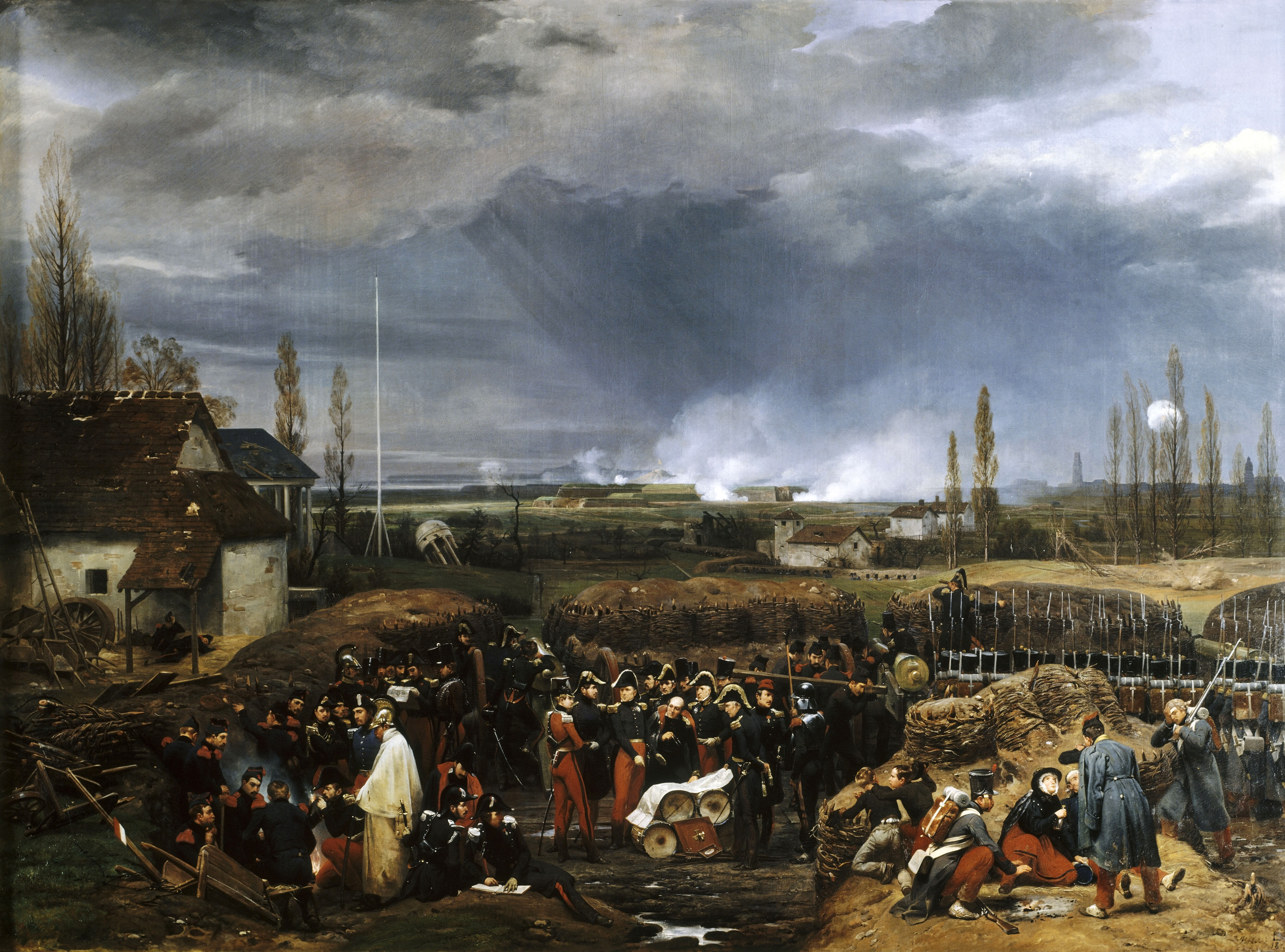
The Siege of Antwerp by Horace Vernet depicting the 1832 siege

The citadel was designed by the Italian engineer Francesco Paciotto and built on the orders of the Duke of Alba. Initial construction was completed in 1572. After the Sack of Antwerp (1576) the citizens partially demolished the fortification, but it was reconstructed after the Fall of Antwerp (1585).

The citadel saw action towards the end of the Napoleonic Wars, when it was defended by determined Bonapartists. The Siege of Antwerp (1814) continued for a month after Napoleon's abdication.

Following the collapse of the South Sea Bubble in late 1720, Robert Knight, the South Sea Company's chief cashier, fled Britain to escape parliamentary prosecution. He was arrested in February 1721 by Austrian authorities and imprisoned in the citadel. Despite diplomatic pressure for his extradition, he remained in Austrian custody until his escape later that year.

After the Belgian Revolution of 1830, Dutch forces remained in control of the citadel until the Siege of Antwerp (1832).

Demolition began in 1874 and was completed in 1881. The site became a new neighbourhood of the city, Zuid, in which the most prominent construction was the new building for the Royal Museum of Fine Arts Antwerp.

== Governors of the citadel ==
In Spanish the title of the governor of the citadel was Castellano de Amberes ("Castellan of Antwerp").

- 1576: Sancho d'Avila
- 1577: Philippe III de Croÿ
- 1587–1596: Don Cristóbal de Mondragón
- 1606-1622: Don Íñigo de Borja
- -1674: Don Pedro Sanpayo.
- 1674-1678: Don Mateo de Villegas.
- 1679–1693: Don Francisco Marcos de Velasco
- 1693-1695: Don Diego Gomez, Marques of Espinosa
- 1695-1700: Don Pedro Alvarez de Vega.
- 1700-: Don Luis de Borja, Marquess of Caracena.
- 1830–1832: David Hendrik Chassé
- Don Fernando de Solís y Vargas de Carvajal, died 1669.
- Don Geronimo de Cobos, died 1643
- Don Diego de Heredia y Arambulo, died 1704
- Don Antonio de Castro y Tello, died 1659
- Don Julian Martinez de la Parra

== Our Lady of the Citadel ==
In the Sint-Joriskerk there is still a brotherhood called Our Lady of the Citadel (Dutch: Onze-Lieve-Vrouw van het Kasteel).
