= Hendrik Detmers =

Dutch military officer

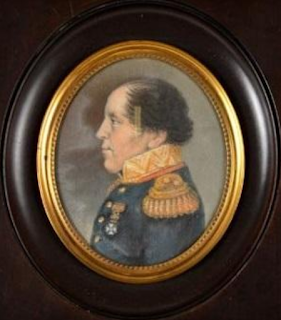
- Hendrik Detmers
- Born: 20 March 1761; Sprundel/Groot-Zundert
- Died: 8 September 1825 (aged 64); The Hague
- Spouse: Maria Johanna Kolff
- Children: 1
- Relatives: Johan Detmers and Justina Constantia Tollius
- Military career
- Allegiance: Dutch Republic; United Kingdom; United Kingdom of the Netherlands
- Branch: (Dutch Republic) Dutch States Army; British Army; Netherlands Army
- Rank: Major-General
- Commands: 1st Brigade, 3rd Netherlands Division
- Conflicts: French Revolutionary Wars; Napoleonic Wars: Battle of Waterloo
- Awards: Military Order of William (Knights Cross 3rd Class)

Hendrik Detmers (20 March 1761 – 8 September 1825) was a Dutch military officer who played an important part in the Battle of Waterloo as a colonel, commanding a brigade.

== Life ==
Detmers was a son of Johan Detmers and Justina Constantia Tollius. He married Maria Johanna Kolff on 13 February 1789. They had one daughter.

== Career ==
=== Dutch Republic ===
He entered service in the Dutch States Army in 1770 (age 10) as a cadet in the Onderwater regiment. He was promoted to second lieutenant on 16 May 1782. He became a captain in 1788 and was promoted to major in 1794. He took part in the Flanders Campaign, where he was involved in the siege of Maubeuge (1793), the Siege of Landrecies (1794), the Battle of Fleurus (1794), the skirmish around Seneffe, which village he defended, and the siege of Geertruidenberg (1795), which he helped defend. After the overthrow of the Dutch Republic by the Batavian Republic in January, 1795 he resigned his commission.

=== Orangist in exile ===
Apparently an ardent Orangist he joined the "Osnabrück Assembly," a group of former soldiers around Prince Frederick of Orange-Nassau who wanted to stage a raid into the Batavian Republic in the summer of 1795. After this project came to nothing he travelled to England where he became involved in the preparations of the Anglo-Russian invasion of Holland of 1799, which he joined on the British side. After the expedition came to nothing he joined the King's Dutch Brigade, a legion in British service founded by, and under command of, the Hereditary Prince. This regiment was formed from former personnel of the Dutch States Army and deserters from the Batavian army on the Isle of Wight in October, 1799. In December 1800, the infantry were put aboard transports and shipped to Cove in Ireland (the artillery remained in Lymington). They joined various regiments that were posted to Ireland at this time in the expectation that the implementation of the Acts to unite the Kingdom of Ireland and Kingdom of Great Britain into the United Kingdom of Great Britain and Ireland with effect from 1 January 1801, could cause some social unrest. The brigade was later deployed in the Channel Islands and on the Isle of Wight against possible French landings. It was dissolved in 1802 and Detmers was put on half-pay. It is not exactly known what he did between 1802 and 1813. He may have returned to the Netherlands.

=== Waterloo and after ===
In 1814 Detmers again entered Dutch service as a lieutenant-colonel. He was promoted to colonel the same year and put in command of the 1st Brigade of the 3rd Division (general Chassé commanding). As such he took part in the Waterloo Campaign

At the start of the Battle of Waterloo, the Dutch 3rd Division was placed in reserve on the right wing of the Anglo-allied under General Lord Hill. When the French Imperial Guard undertook its famous assault on the Anglo-allied right wing toward the end of the day, and the Anglo-allied line was hard pressed, the 3rd Division was ordered forward at the initiative of General David Hendrik Chassé. The 4th Grenadiers of the French Middle Guard were attacked by a horse artillery battery of the 3rd Division under Captain Carel Frederik Krahmer de Bichin, but they kept advancing. The British 3rd Regiment of Foot poured fire onto the Guard, and Chassé ordered Detmers to charge the French column with his brigade. This was to be a bayonet charge, as Chassé had a predilection for this type of manoeuvre which had earned him the nickname of "général baionette" from Napoleon. The Dutch troops advanced in a state of high excitement, cheering wildly and lifting their shakos on their bayonets. In combination with the fire of the British infantry (notably the Guards and 52nd Regiment of Foot), and as this happened at the same time the French suffered a number of other setbacks, the 4th Grenadiers broke; this retreat is considered the "tipping point" of the battle: the Duke of Wellington gave the sign for a general advance of the Anglo-allied army after which Napoleon's army started to collapse.

Some historians have speculated that because of this feat of arms Wellington referred to Detmers when he praised the conduct of a "general Vanhope, commanding a Brigade of Infantry of the King of the Netherlands" in a dispatch he wrote on 19 June to Lord Bathurst, as there was no officer with the surname van Hope in the Dutch army, let alone anyone by that name that warranted a mention in dispatches. Kyle van Beurden in his dissertation stated that Wellington in his report to William I of the Netherlands made clear that he had actually intended to compliment Major-General Alexandre Charles Joseph Ghislain d'Aubremé, the commander of the 3rd Division's 2nd Brigade, though since only Detmers' 1st Brigade had engaged in active combat, van Beurden concluded that Wellington was thinking of Detmers.

In any case, Detmers received a Knight's Cross Third Class in the Military Order of William for his exploit in 1815. On 24 August 1816 he was promoted to major-general and appointed Provincial Commander of the province of South Holland in the Dutch Army. He still was in that post when he died in 1825.
