= Alexandre Charles Joseph Ghislain d'Aubremé =

Southern Netherlands general

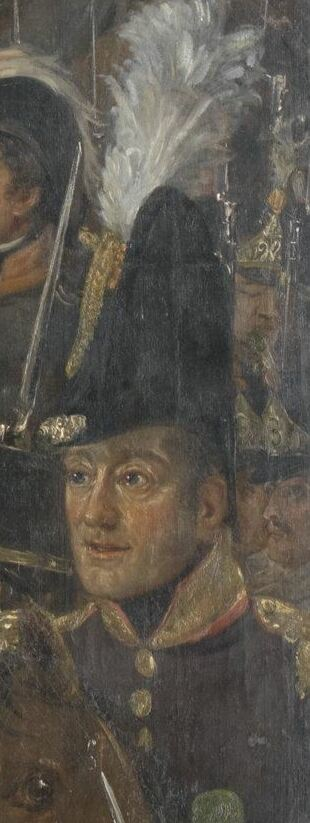
- A.C.J.G d'Aubremé (Note: Detail of painting The Battle of Waterloo by Jan Willem Pieneman)
- Born: 17 June 1773; Brussels, Austrian Netherlands
- Died: 13 February 1835 (aged 61); Aachen, Kingdom of Prussia
- Spouse: Amélie Caroline Baillet Dubois
- Military career
- Allegiance: French First Republic; Batavian Republic; (Netherlands) Kingdom of Holland; First French Empire; United Kingdom of the Netherlands
- Branch: Infantry: Armée du Nord; (Batavian Republic) Batavian army; (Netherlands) Army of the Kingdom of Holland; Grande Armée; Army of the United Kingdom of the Netherlands
- Service years: 1792–1828
- Rank: Lieutenant-General
- Commands: 136e régiment d'infanterie de ligne, Grande Armée; 2nd brigade, 3rd Netherlands division, Dutch Mobile Army
- Conflicts: War of the First Coalition; Flanders Campaign; Rhine campaign of 1796; War of the Second Coalition; Anglo-Russian invasion of Holland; War of the Third Coalition; War of the Fourth Coalition; War of the Fifth Coalition; War of the Sixth Coalition; Battle of Lützen; Battle of Bautzen; Battle of Brienne; Battle of Montmirail; Battle of Gué-à-Tresmes; Waterloo Campaign; Battle of Waterloo
- Awards: Knight Order of the Union; Knight Order of the Reunion; Chevalier Légion d'Honneur; Knight-Commander of the Military Order of William; Knight-Commander of the Order of the Dutch Lion
- Other work: Adjutant-General of the Army (1818-181); Commissioner-General (Minister) for War 1819-1826

Alexandre Charles Joseph Ghislain Count d'Aubremé (also Alexander Carel Joseph Gislain) (Brussels, baptised 17 June 1773 – Aachen, 13 February 1835) was a Southern Netherlands general in the service consecutively of the French First Republic, the Batavian Republic, the Kingdom of Holland, the First French Empire, the Sovereign Principality of the United Netherlands, and the United Kingdom of the Netherlands. He commanded the 2nd brigade of the 3rd Netherlands division at the Battle of Waterloo (where he was mentioned in dispatches). He served as Minister of War under king William I of the Netherlands.

== Life ==
=== Personal life ===
D'Aubremé was the son of Anne Marie Léonard and Charles François Joseph Laurent d'Aubremé. He was married with Amélie Caroline Baillet Dubois.

=== Career ===
D'Aubremé entered the service of the French First Republic as a second lieutenant in the 2nd regiment of Belgians, which was part of the Armée du Nord. He served under Dumouriez, Custine, Houchard, and Pichegru in the Flanders Campaign of the War of the First Coalition. He was part of the invading army which entered the Dutch Republic in December 1794, that helped bring about the Batavian Republic. He entered the service of the new Batavian army in June 1795 as a captain. As such he took part with Herman Willem Daendels in the Rhine campaign of 1796. In 1799 he participated in the defense of the Franco-Batavian army against the Anglo-Russian invasion of Holland. In 1808 (in the service of the Kingdom of Holland) he was promoted to major as a member of the Guards regiment. After the annexation of that Kingdom by the First French Empire in 1810 he served in Napoleon's Grande Armée where he became colonel commanding the 136th regiment of the line. As such he took part in the Battle of Lützen, where he distinguished himself, before he was wounded. Napoleon gave him 42 knight's crosses of the Légion d'Honneur to distribute as he saw fit among his men which he did, without keeping one for himself. Two weeks later he participated with the 136th in the Battle of Bautzen (1813) where he again distinguished himself, despite not being completely recovered. This time he was himself decorated with the knight's cross of the Légion d'Honneur. He took part in the battles of Brienne, Montmirail, and Gué-à-Tresmes, where he was wounded near Lizy-sur-Ourcq on 28 February 1814. By that time only five officers and nineteen other ranks remained of the 136th.

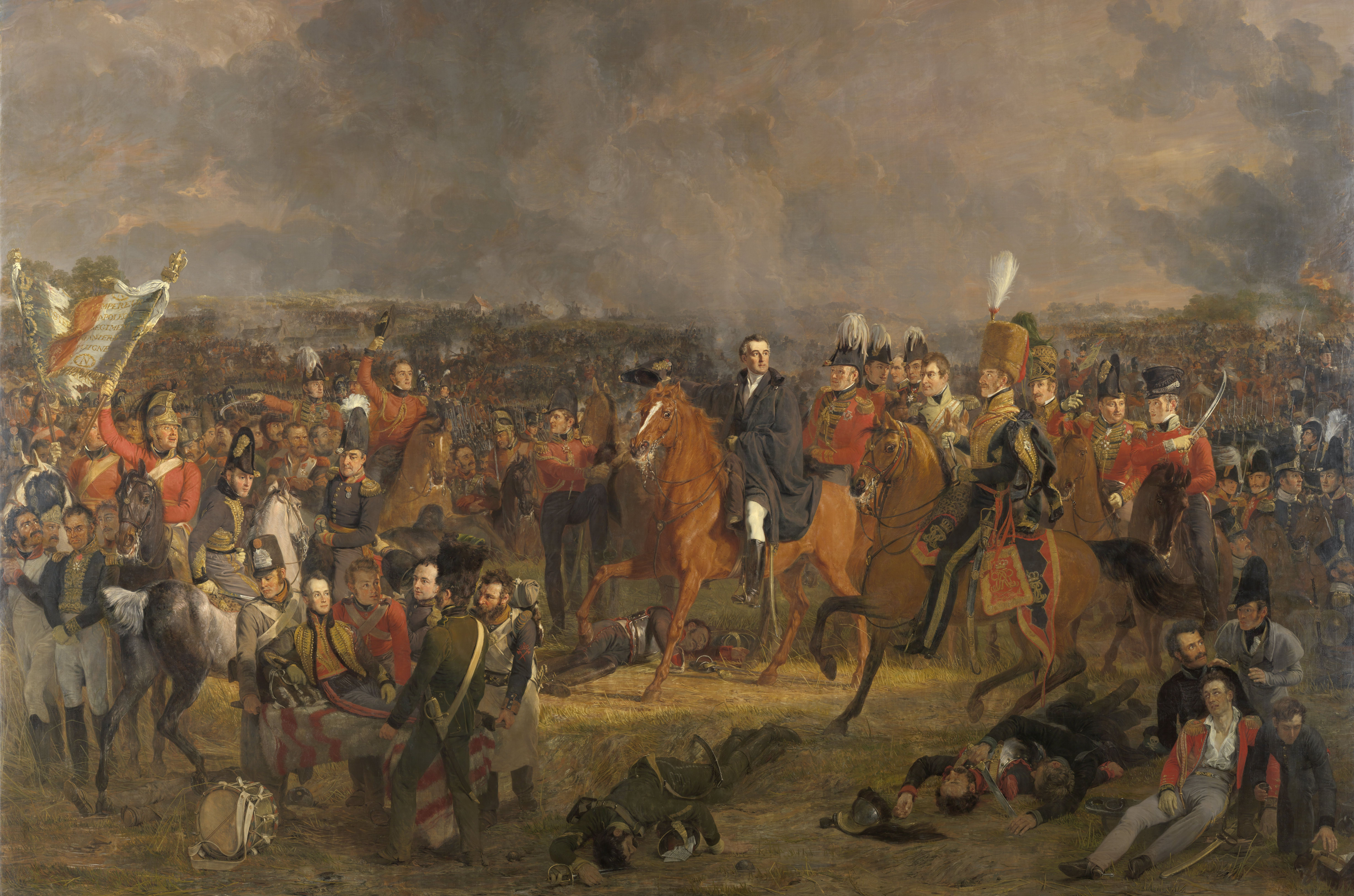
The Battle of Waterloo, by Jan Willem Pieneman (Note: Gen. d'Aubremé stands on the extreme right of the painting; see annotation on the illustration.)

In October 1814 he left French service and entered the service of the Sovereign Principality of the United Netherlands as a colonel. He was appointed military governor of the fortress of Mons and Hainaut Province. (Note: At this time the Sovereign Prince, future king William I, was acting as Governor-General of the former Austrian Netherlands on behalf of the Allies. This area would soon be united with the Principality to the United Kingdom of the Netherlands.) In April 1815 he was promoted to major-general. Soon thereafter he was appointed commander of the 2nd brigade of the 3rd Netherlands division of the Mobile Army of the United Kingdom of the Netherlands. This was part of I Corps of the Anglo-Allied army which took, under the command of the Prince of Orange, part in the Waterloo Campaign during the Hundred Days. The brigade remained at Nivelles during the Battle of Quatre-Bras, but during the latter part of the Battle of Waterloo the brigade took part in the decisive intervention of the 3rd Netherlands division (general Chassé against the French Middle Guard. (Note: In note 1 on pp. 267–268 De Bas strongly condemns the assertion by Herbert Taylor Siborne, the son of William Siborne in his Siborne, W.T., ed. (1891). Waterloo Letters: a selection from original and hitherto unpublished letters bearing on the operations of the 16th, 17th, and 18 June 1815, by officers who served in the campaign. London: Cassell and Co. pp. 172, 185. that the brigade of d'Aubremé had shown signs of panic, which he calls "calumnious". He also remarks that general Lord Hill mentioned d'Aubremé in dispatches after the battle, and that Wellington himself praised d'Aubremé in his report to king William after the battle.)

D'Aubremé was on 23 February 1818 appointed Adjutant-General of the army, charged with personnel matters. After the dismissal of his colleague Piepers in October 1818, d'Aubremé performed both their functions. He was made Commissioner-General (Minister) of the War Department on 5 February 1819, which office he held until 15 June 1826, when he was succeeded by Prince Frederick of the Netherlands. The king created him a count at this occasion.

In 1828 he was promoted to lieutenant-general. During the Belgian Revolution in 1830 d'Aubremé lived in Brussels where he served in the general staff of the army. In the first days of the revolution he was asked to lead mixed military and civilian patrols to keep order as he was seen as of a neutral disposition. On his way to the Brussels town hall he was applauded by the insurgents, who appreciated his service. But nothing came of this initiative. He remained loyal to the king and moved to the northern Netherlands. Thereafter he went in voluntary exile in Aachen, where he suddenly died from a stroke on 13 February 1835.

== Sources ==
- Aa, A. J. van der, ed. (1852). "Alexander Karel Joseph Gislain d' Aubremé". Biografisch Woordenboek der Nederlanden. Deel 1 (DBNL) (in Dutch). pp. 430–432.
- Bas, F. de; De T'Serclaes de Wommersom, J. (1908). La campagne de 1815 aux Pays-Bas d'après les rapports officiels néerlandais. Tome II : Waterloo (in French). Paris: Librairie Plon.
- Aubremé (Charles-Alexandre-Joseph-Ghislain, comte d') (in French). Bruxelles: H.Ode. 1847. p. 369.
- Blok, P.J.; Molhuysen, P.C., eds. (1933). "Aubremé, Alexandre Charles Joseph Ghislain graaf d'". Nieuw Nederlandsch biografisch woordenboek (DBNL) (in Dutch). Sijthoff. pp. 34–35.
