= François Gédéon Bailly de Monthion =

French general (1776-1850)

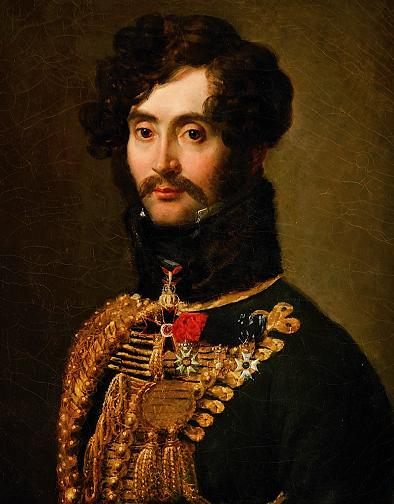
Portrait of François Gédéon Bailly, Count of Monthion (author unknown)

François Gédéon, comte Bailly de Monthion (French pronunciation: [fʁɑ̃swa ʒede.ɔ̃ baji də mɔ̃tjɔ̃]; 1776–1850) was a French general.

== Early career ==
Monthion enlisted in an infantry regiment in February 1793 and saw active service at Marengo (1800) and Austerlitz (1805).

== Peninsular War ==
On 20 September 1808, Monthion's troops were routed at Bilbao by Blake, who had previously set in motion a plan to threaten Burgos with a small portion of his army of some 32,000 Galicians and Asturians, while with the main body he would march on Bilbao. Having sent his 'vanguard' and 'reserve' brigades towards Burgos, Blake moved on Bilbao with four complete divisions, with the Marquis of Portazgo's division routing the 1,500-strong French garrison, and Monthion withdrawing to Durango. The Spanish troops abandoned the city the following week as Ney's troops approached.

In July 1811, General Monthion's Reserve of the Army of Spain, stationed at Bayonne, numbered 8,047 men, with 251 officers.
