= Bombardment of Antwerp (1830) =

Burning of Antwerp
- Part of Belgian Revolution
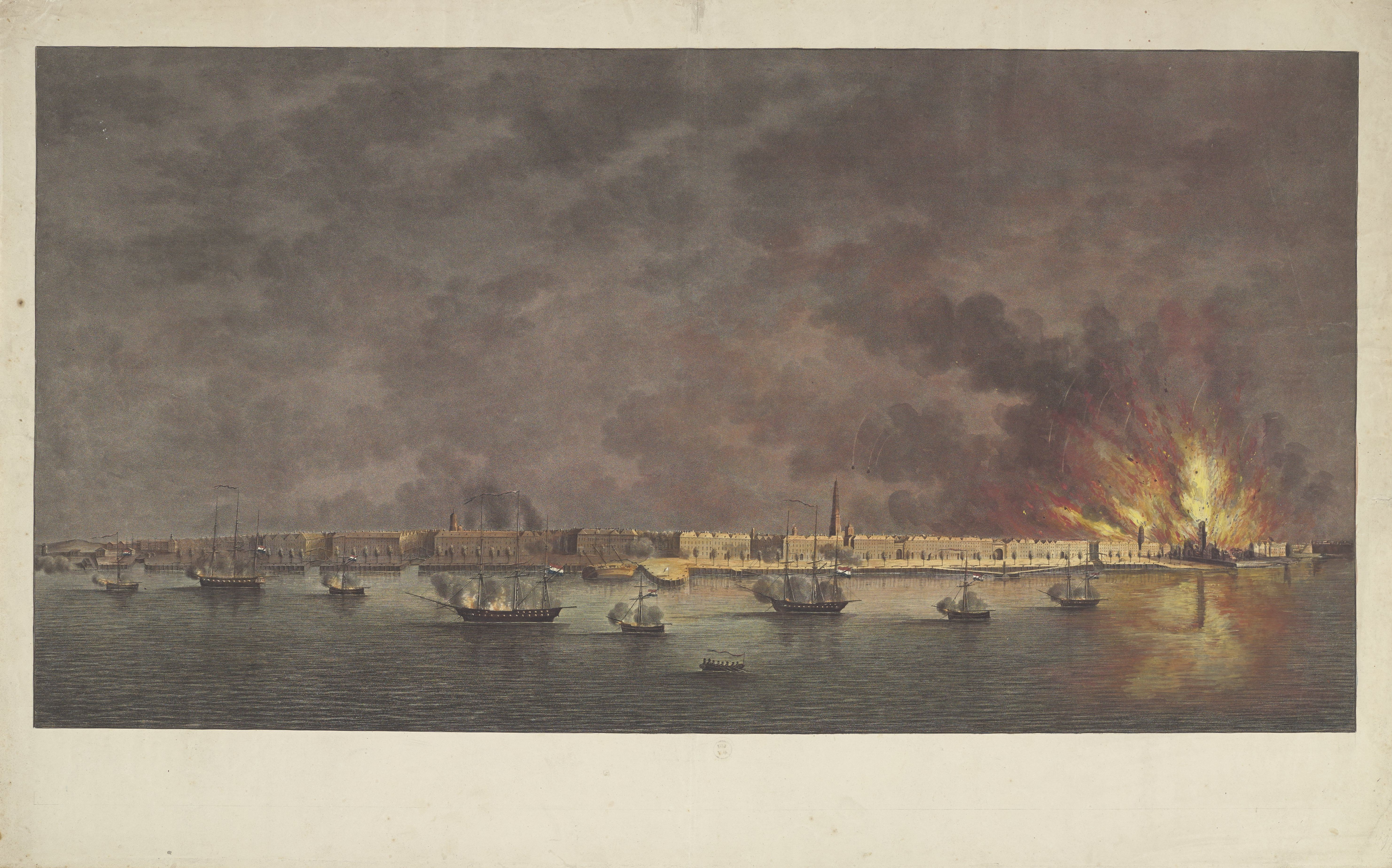
- Bombardment of Antwerp, 1830
Date	27 October 1830
Location	Belgium, Antwerp
Result	Dutch victory

Belligerents
Netherlands	Belgium

Commanders and leaders
David Hendrik Chassé	

Strength
Mostly Gunboats	Population was 73,605

Casualties and losses
Low, or none	Estimated 9 Million Dollars+ of Property Destroyed number of dead unknown but Chasse said bloody, and so many dead

The Bombardment of Antwerp in 1830 was a military event that took place during the Belgian Revolution.

== Background ==
Antwerp joined the uprising in October. Dutch naval ships were subsequently sent to the river Scheldt, where they inspected all vessels for contraband. This led to a tightening of trade in the port city. As the navigation on the Scheldt fell under the control of the North Dutch navy, Antwerp lost its free access to the North Sea. Meanwhile, the royal troops, under the command of General David Hendrik Chassé, took refuge in the citadel in the southern part of Antwerp, a powerful stronghold from which they could bombard the city. General David Hendrik Baron Chassé received information that some Belgians had occupied Dutch posts within the city, and there were even reports of some Belgians urging the Dutch forces to surrender the citadel. In response to these developments, Chassé took decisive action and ordered the bombardment of the city.

== Bombardment ==
During the intense conflict, the Belgians responded by firing upon the Dutch troops who were bombarding the St. Andries district and the Abbey of Saint Michael from the citadel and from their ships. Witnesses from Brussels, who arrived in Antwerp, expressed their observations, describing a scene of chaos, with streets filled with debris and houses left in ruins, and called the Dutch people full with vengeance, and cruel. Emotions ran high, and many Belgians became even more resentful and angry towards the Dutch. Amid the turmoil, many

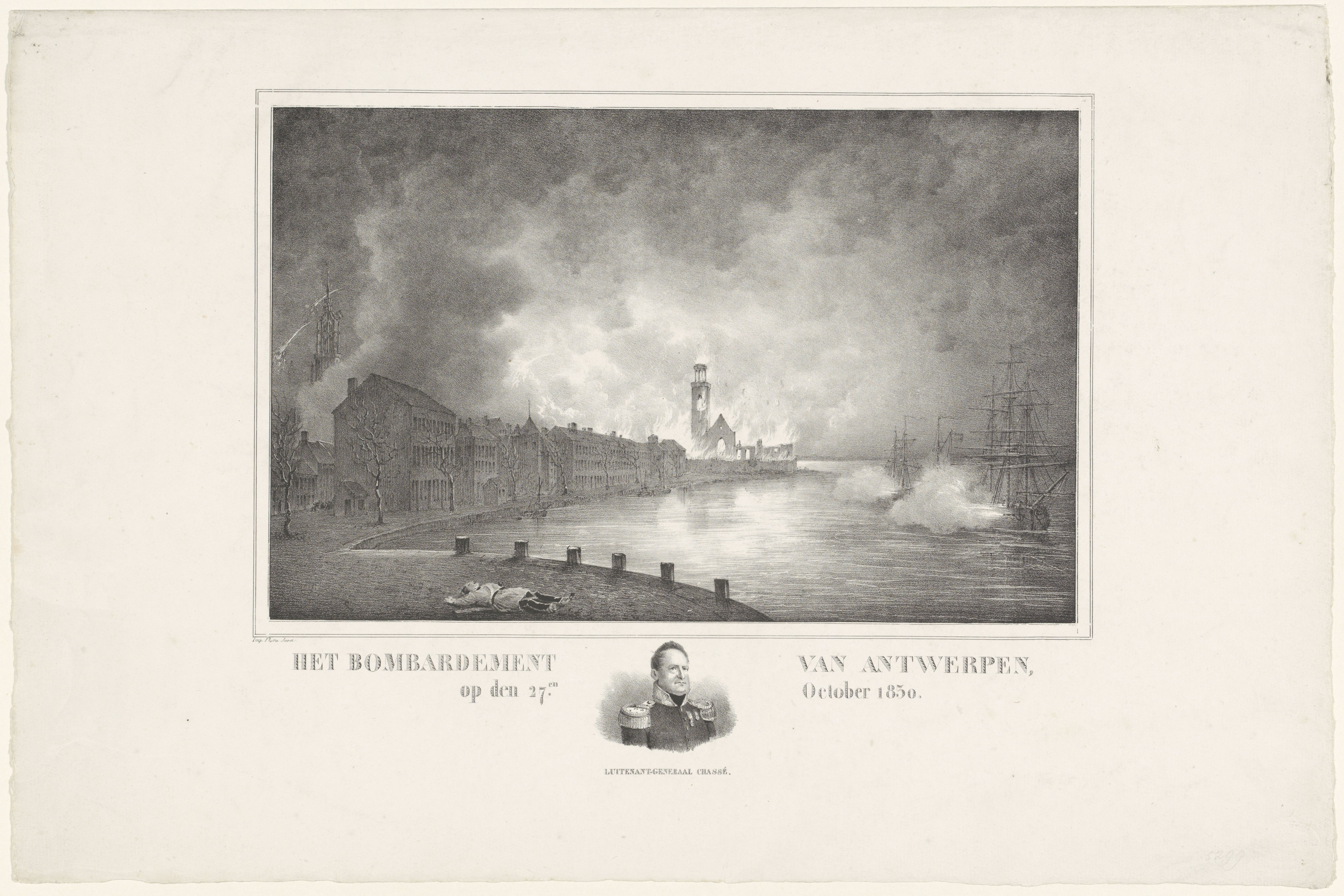

civilians were forced to flee the city, seeking safety while dealing with distress and grief. The Dutch forces were now attacking from multiple directions, and in return, the Belgians sent out fire ships to engage the Dutch. However, it seemed the Dutch forces were again unamused, and remained focused on their objective to inflict damage upon Antwerp and subject it to continuous bombardment.

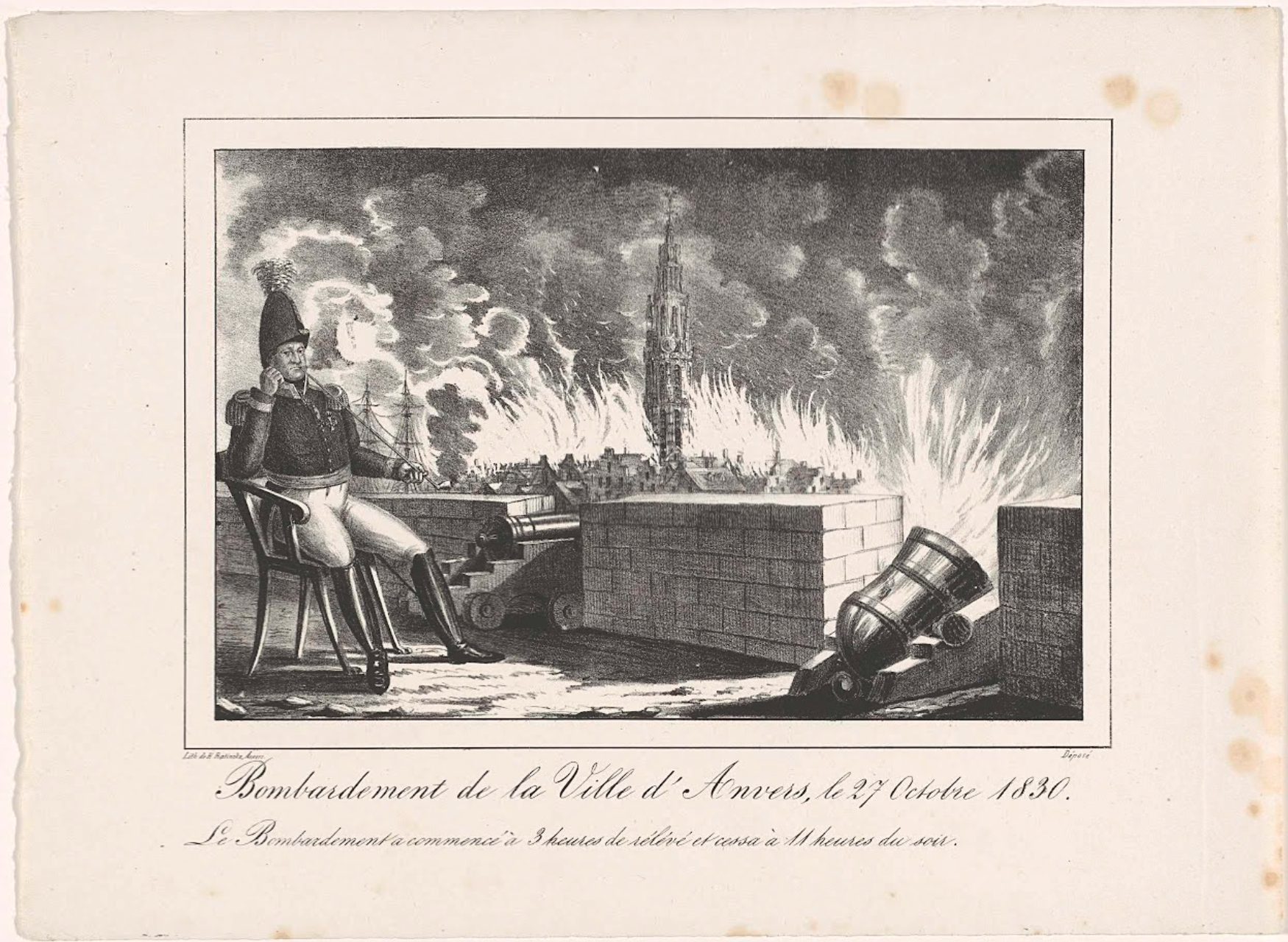
Mockery cartoon of chasse during the bombardment

Even though the provisional government had declared the southern provinces independent from the United Kingdom of the Netherlands on October 4, 1830, after the bombardment, General Chassé perceived that his mission had been successfully accomplished. It would not be until the Siege of Antwerp that the Citadel (originally built under the Spanish reign of terror in the 16th century) fell into the hands of Marshal Gérard on December 23, 1832.
