= Combat of Mesas de Ibor =

Minor battle of the Peninsular War

- Part of the Peninsular War
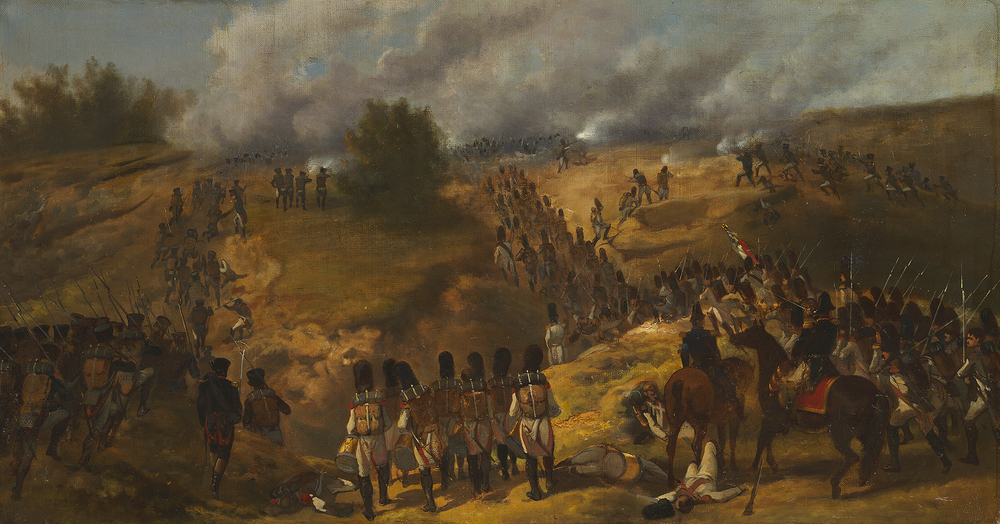
- The attack of the Dutch Brigade at Mesas de Ibor.
Date	17 March 1809
Location	Mesas de Ibor, province of Cáceres (Extremadura)
Result	French victory

Belligerents
Spain	France

Commanders and leaders
Duke del Parque	Jean François Leval

Strength
~5,000	~3,000

Casualties and losses
Unknown (Note: While some French sources refer to 1,000 casualties, Oman (1903) considers that figure unlikely, due to the mountainous terrain which would allow for defeated troops to scatter easily.)	70 killed and 428 wounded

The combat of Mesas de Ibor (Note: Oman (1903) refers to it as Meza de Ibor.) (17 March 1809) was a French victory during the Peninsular War at which the Spanish troops under General Duke del Parque were defeated by Leval's division, made up of German battalions.

== Location ==
The battle took place in the ravine of the Ibor river, a tributary of the Tagus, near Mesas de Ibor, province of Cáceres (Extremadura).

== Background ==
Much against his own wishes, General Victor, based at Salamanca, was forced to obey Napoleon's direct orders to advance on Extremadura. He therefore set off, on 14 March, at the head of a corps that numbered 15,000 infantry, and about 5,500 cavalry, together with sixty guns (with 1,600 artillerymen). His army was made up of Ruffin's division (nine battalions), Villatte's division (twelve battalions), Leval's division of eight battalions (plus the Westphalian Cavalry regiment of the 4th Corps that had been attached to his division). His other cavalry consisted of his own two regiments, together with Latour-Maubourg's six regiments of dragoons and three regiments of Lasalle's light cavalry.

== The battle ==
Despite commanding a strong position, with six guns and 5,000 troops, on the heights of the other side of the ravine, Parque was forced to retreat, pushing his guns over the precipice, as Leval's eight German battalions, the vanguard of Victor's army, crossed the river and made their way up the sides of the ravine.

== Outcome ==
Parque retreated to Cuesta's headquarters at Deleitosa.

== See also ==
- Timeline of the Peninsular War
