= Siege of Antwerp (1832) =

French siege of Antwerp in 1832

Coordinates: 51.2167°N 4.4000°E

- Part of the aftermath of the Belgian Revolution
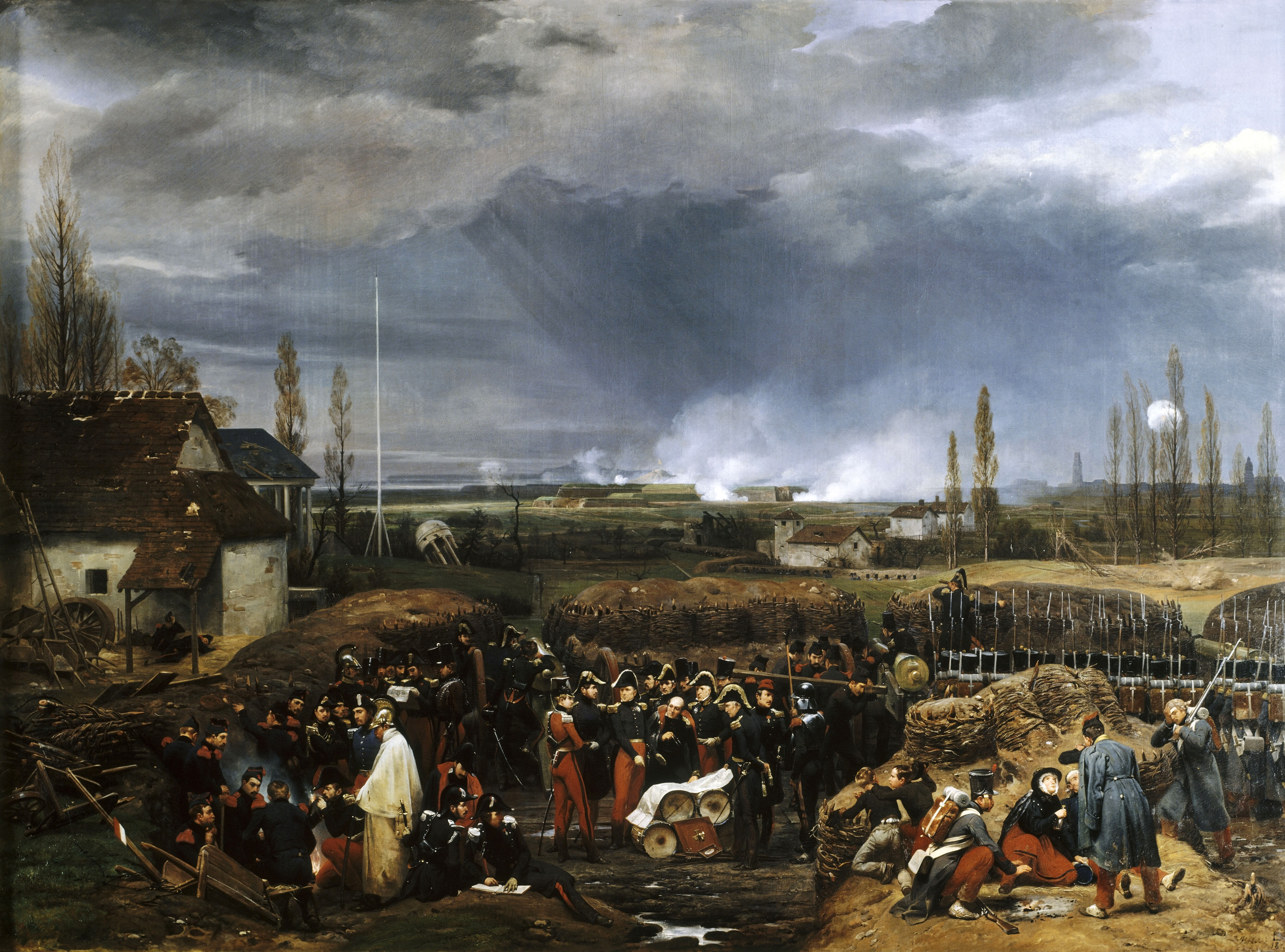
- The Siege of Antwerp by Horace Vernet, 1840
Date	15 November – 23 December 1832
Location	Antwerp, Belgium
Result	French victory

Belligerents
France; Supported by: Belgium	(United Kingdom of the Netherlands) United Netherlands

Commanders and leaders
(France) Étienne Gérard (France) François Haxo	(United Kingdom of the Netherlands) David Chassé (surrendered)

Units involved
Armée du Nord	

Strength
50,000–60,000	4,500

Casualties and losses
608 dead 1,800 wounded	90 dead 349 wounded

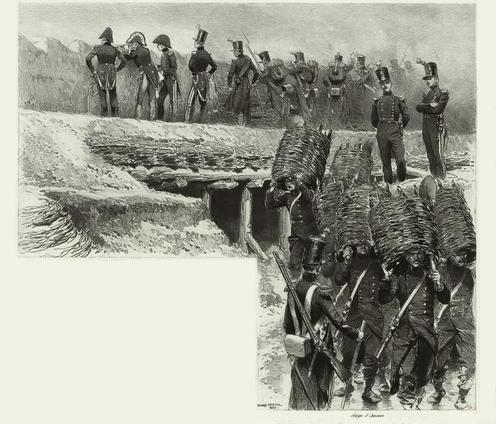
French Engineer Corps during the Siege of Antwerp

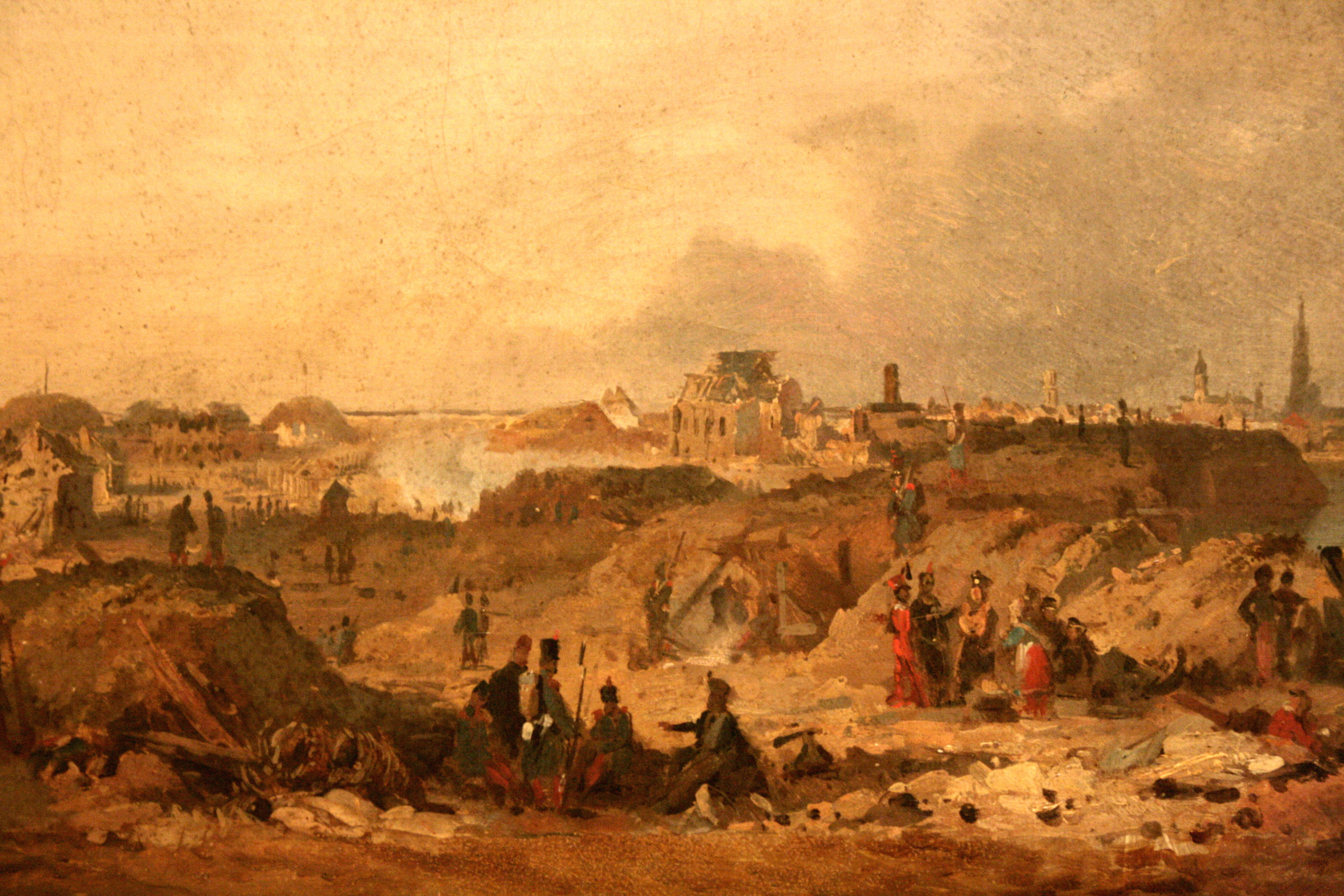
The citadel of Antwerp after its capture by the French Army

The siege of Antwerp took place after fighting in the Belgian Revolution ended. On 15 November 1832, the French Armée du Nord under Marshal Gérard began to lay siege to the Dutch troops there under David Chassé. The siege ended on 23 December 1832. The French had agreed with the Belgian rebels that the latter would not participate in the battle.

Following the French army's first intervention in 1831, the Dutch withdrew from Belgium but left a garrison in Antwerp Citadel, from which they bombarded the town. The Armée du Nord and its siege specialist François, Baron Haxo took 24 days to take this citadel and return it to Belgium. Leopold I of Belgium gave France several cannons of different calibres as thanks for this action and the French Chamber of Peers offered Gérard an épée d'honneur ("sword of honour"). A monument to the French dead in the siege was sculpted in 1897, but the town of Antwerp refused to take it and it is now in Tournai.

== Background ==
When the Dutch withdrew from Belgium after the campaign called the Ten Days' Campaign, they left a garrison in the citadel of Antwerp, which resulted in a second operation of the Armée du Nord of Marshal Gérard, who returned with his army to Belgium November 15, 1832, when he laid siege to Antwerp.

The Dutch general Chassé, who participated in the defeat of the French Imperial Guard at Waterloo in 1815, bombarded the city of Antwerp from the fort using heated shot, setting fire to hundreds of homes and causing many casualties among the civilian population. This caused the intervention of the Belgian volunteers who until then had been kept out of combat. Meanwhile, the Belgian army, gradually formed and re-equipped, went to defend the dikes of the Scheldt north of Antwerp, preventing the Dutch from damaging them.

== Siege ==
For several decades, the siege tactics of the Vauban fortresses were limited to the method of the saps and parallels, usually causing the surrender of the besieged soon after the fortifications were pierced. The Armée du Nord conceived of the idea of using large mortars to fire shells into the fortress from above.

== Commemoration and legacy ==
Leopold I gave several guns of various calibers to France and Marshal Gerard received a sword of honor offered by the King and the Belgian government in gratitude. The French Monument, carved in 1897 to celebrate the memory of French soldiers who fell for the capture of Antwerp in 1832, is currently in Tournai following the refusal of the city of Antwerp to accept it.

In June 1837, to celebrate the marriage of the Duke of Orleans, the Champ de Mars in Paris served to represent the scene of the mock capture of the citadel of Anvers.

== Sources ==
- Van der Aa, Abraham Jacob (1858). "David Hendrik, Baron Chasse". Biographisch woordenboek der Nederlanden. Deel 3 [Biographical Dictionary of the Nethlerlands Volume 3 (in Dutch). pp. 323–328.
