= The Siege of Antwerp =

Painting by Horace Vernet

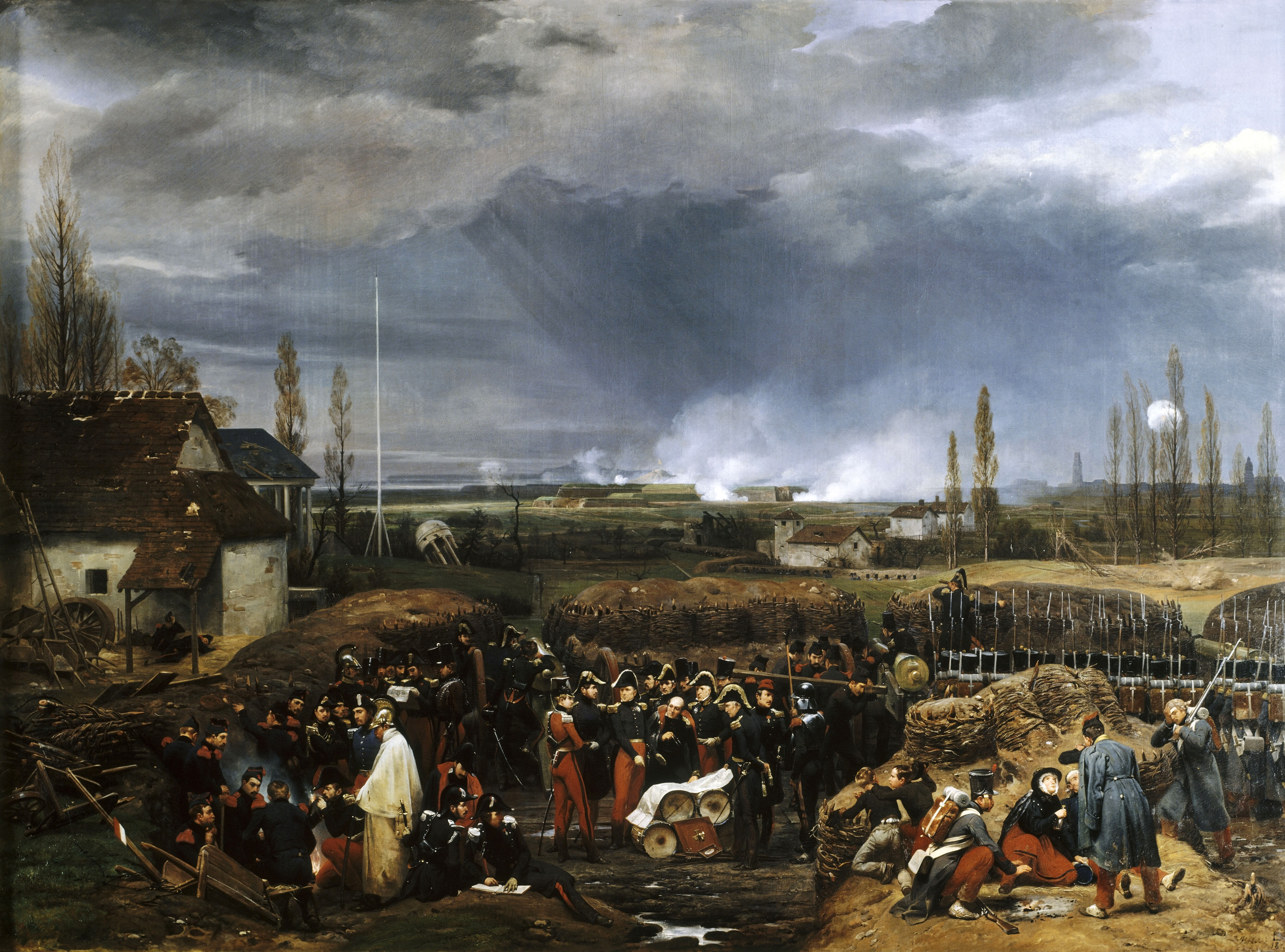
- Artist: Horace Vernet
- Year: 1840
- Type: Oil on canvas, history painting
- Dimensions: 512 cm × 696 cm (202 in × 274 in)
- Location: Palace of Versailles, Versailles

The Siege of Antwerp (French: Le Siège d’Anvers) is an 1840 history painting by the French artist Horace Vernet.

== History and description ==
It depicts the 1832 Siege of Antwerp when the French Army of the North besieged and captured the Dutch-held Antwerp Citadel in Belgium. The concluding stage of the Belgian Revolution it was a major foreign policy boost for the new July Monarchy of Louis Philippe I. The painting shows Marshal Gérard order the assault on the Citadel. He is accompanied by the Duke of Orléans and the Duke of Nemours, the two eldest sons of the king. To the left a group of soldiers drink and warm themselves by a fire while to the right a cantinière treats wounded troops.

Vernet developed a reputation for depicting the battles of the Revolutionary and Napoleonic eras. He later produced works representing more recent conflicts such as the Conquest of Algeria. At the time of the Belgian events portrayed the artist was serving as director of the French Academy in Rome before returning to France in 1834. The work was commissioned by the French authorities to hang in the refurbished Palace of Versailles.

== Bibliography ==
- Cardoza, Thomas. Intrepid Women: Cantinières and Vivandières of the French Army. Indiana University Press, 2010.
- Da Vinha, Mathieu & Masson, Raphaël. Versailles: histoire, dictionnaire et anthologie. Robert Laffont, 2015.
- Harkett, Daniel & Hornstein, Katie (ed.) Horace Vernet and the Thresholds of Nineteenth-Century Visual Culture. Dartmouth College Press, 2017.
- Melegari, Vezio. The Great Military Sieges. New English Library, 1972.
- Sessions, Jennifer Elson. Making Colonial France: Culture, National Identity and the Colonization of Algeria, 1830-1851. University of Pennsylvania, 2005.
