= François de Bas =

Dutch general

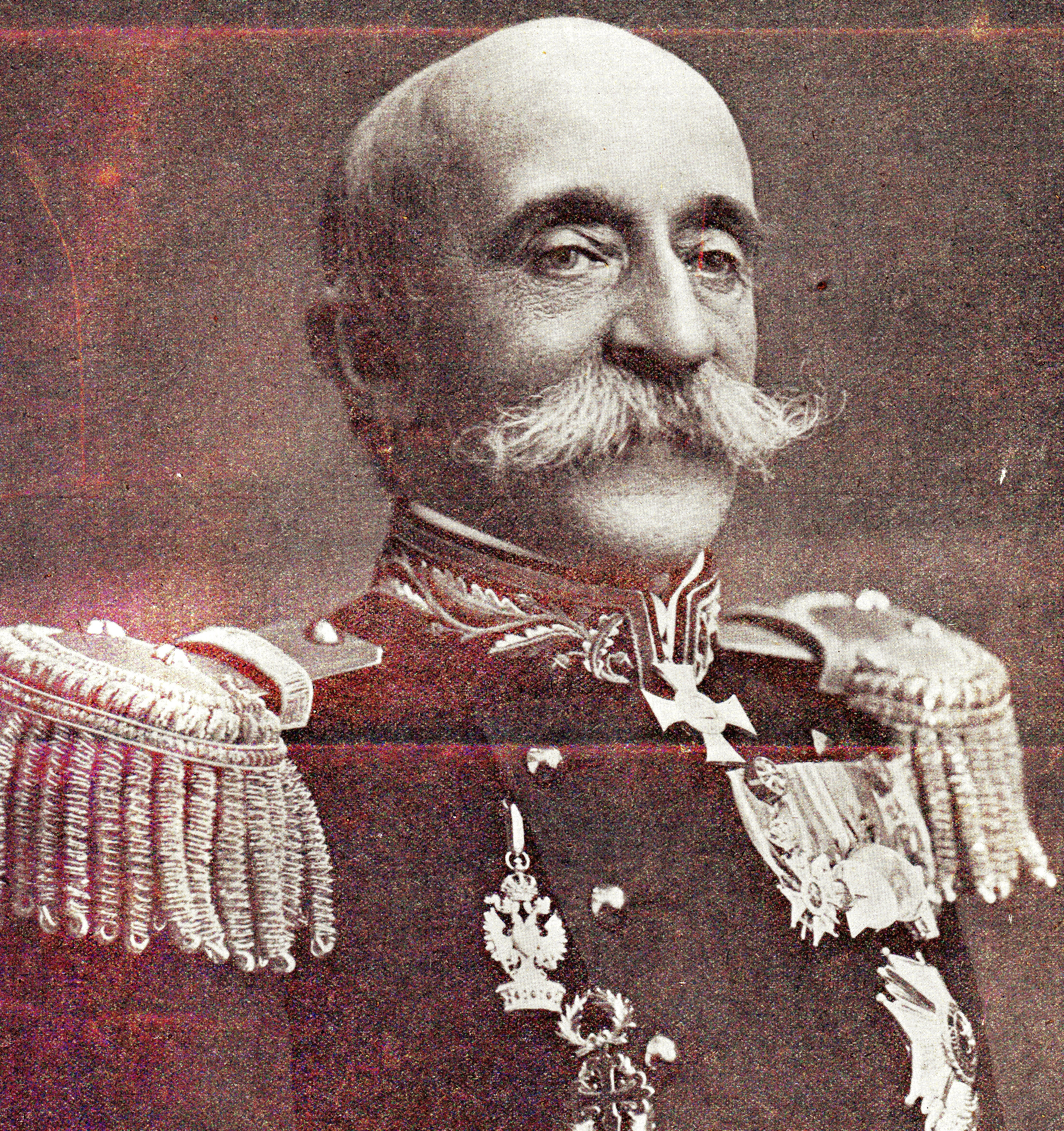
- General François de Bas
- Born: François de Bas; 10 September 1840; The Hague
- Died: 9 February 1931 (aged 90); The Hague, Netherlands
- Occupation: military historian

François de Bas (10 September 1840 – 22 February 1931) was a Dutch general and military historian. He almost single-handedly founded the military-history section of the Dutch General Staff. He co-authored major historical works on the Dutch States Army and the Campaign of 1815, which climaxed with the Battle of Waterloo. The latter work is still the authoritative source on the Dutch-Belgian role in that battle, because it contains copies of after-battle reports of Dutch officers who participated in the battle, the originals of which were lost in a Royal Air Force bombardment of the Dutch Army archives in 1945.

== Life ==
De Bas was born in The Hague, the son of Willem Jacobus de Bas, Heer of Barwoutswaarder en Bekenes, and Johanna Maria Köhler. He married Maria Cornelia Wilhelmina Vinkhuyzen on 26 August 1863. They had five surviving children.

== Career ==
After boarding school (the academy of Guillaume Alexander Burnier in The Hague), De Bas entered the Royal Dutch Military Academy in Breda as a cadet of Horse on 4 September 1856. He received a commission as a second lieutenant in the Third Regiment of Dragoons on 1 July 1860. After only four years he was made a first lieutenant in the Dutch General Staff. In 1868 he was one of four young officers who were admitted to the first class in the Dutch Staff college, from which he graduated, first in the class, in 1872. The same year he was promoted to captain of Horse in the Second Regiment of Hussars. In 1873 he joined the General Staff again as a captain. He served as a professor at the Staff College from 1878 till 1885. In the latter year he was promoted to major and reassigned to his old cavalry regiment, where he soon received a promotion to lieutenant colonel.

However, soon after that promotion his career was cut short by a scandal in his regiment. His daughter was "seduced" by a fellow officer, a young second lieutenant, and the two young people were forced to marry. In the social circumstances of the Dutch army of the time the scandal also reflected on the father and he was no longer considered worthy of advancement. For that reason he asked to be put on non-active status in August 1890.

However, this setback prompted him to embark on a second career, that would bring him much more renown. As a student at the Staff College he had been seconded in 1870 to Lieutenant General Willem Jan Knoop, the doyen of Dutch military historians at the time. Knoop had made the suggestion in 1858 to the Royal Netherlands Academy of Arts and Sciences to collect the Dutch military archives and make them available for publication. Though the Academy advised favorably on this project at the time it would take until the 1890s before the plan came to fruition. De Bas became the person to implement the project.

His qualification for the task was that he already had made a name for himself as a military historian with his biography of Prince Frederick of the Netherlands and the wider military history surrounding that general's career (which encompassed the Battle of Waterloo and the Belgian Revolution). In 1890 De Bas proposed to the Minister for War, J.W. Bergansius, the founding of a military-history section in the General Staff. Though this proposal was not followed at the time, the Minister gave him a commission to start collecting sources on Dutch military history.

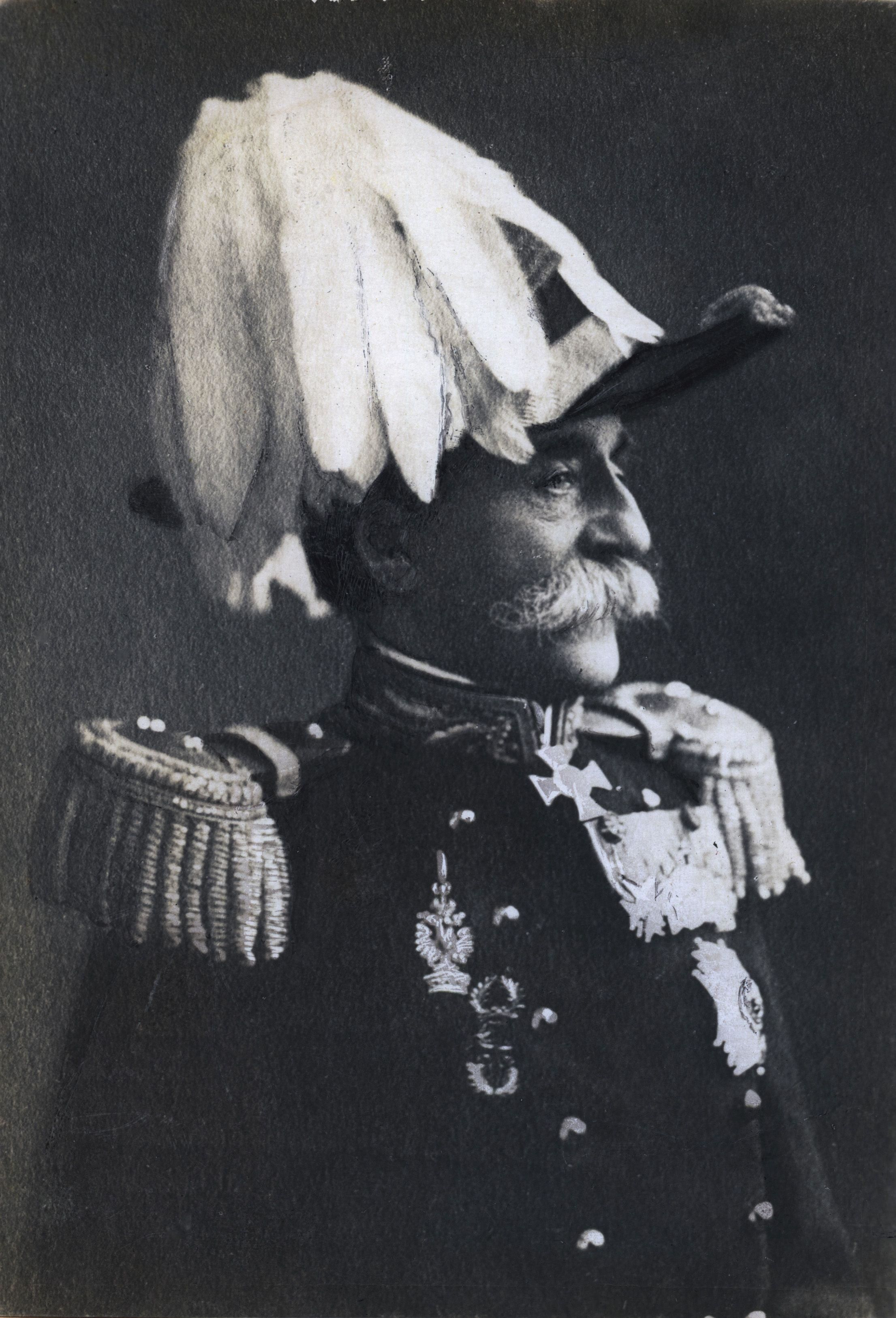
De Bas in 1926

In 1895 De Bas, still a lieutenant colonel, was formally retired at his own request, but given the titular rank of colonel. In 1897 he was made director of the Military Archives of the General Staff. He had already received a temporary commission at the Archives of the Dutch royal house in 1892. In the latter function he negotiated in 1900 with the head of the House of Nassau, Adolphe, Grand Duke of Luxembourg, on behalf of Queen Emma of the Netherlands about the right of the descendants of her daughter, Queen Wilhelmina, who was about to marry Duke Henry of Mecklenburg-Schwerin, to keep using the Nassau name.

As director of the Military Archives he regularly published the sources he had uncovered. He also (after negotiations with the Belgian government) co-authored a history of the Dutch and Belgian troops in the Battle of Quatre-Bras and that of Waterloo in four volumes with the colonel of the Belgian General Staff, Jacques, count of 'tSerclaes de Wommersom that was published in 1908/9. The work may be seen as an attempt to redress the often disparaging account given in Anglophone historical works, such as the ones by William Siborne and his son Henry Taylor Siborne, and the historians that based themselves on their sources, of the conduct of the Dutch and Belgian troops and their commanding officers at those battles. His efforts in this respect brought him the promotion to titulary Major General in 1908.

In 1908 he was joined at the military-history section of the General Staff by lieutenant-colonel (ret.) F.J.G. ten Raa, who had already collected most of the material for a standard work on the history of the Dutch States Army (the army of the Dutch Republic). The first volume of this work was published in 1911 and De Bas used his position as head of the military-history section to have himself named as co-author of this book, though it was virtually entirely written by Ten Raa. However, this kind of arrangement was not unheard of in academic circles at the time. Ten Raa was recognized as sole author of volumes 6 and 7 in 1940, and 1950, respectively.

De Bas was promoted to lieutenant-general in 1913. He remained at the military-history section till bad health forced him to resign in 1927, almost 87 years old at the time. He died in 1931 in The Hague.

== Works ==
- De Bas, François (1887). Prins Frederik Der Nederlanden en Zijn Tijd, vol. 1. H. A. M. Roelants.
- De Bas, François (1891). Prins Frederik der Nederlanden en Zijn Tijd, vol. 2. H. A. M. Roelants.
- De Bas, François (1903). Prins Frederik Der Nederlanden en Zijn Tijd, vol. 3. H. A. M. Roelants.
- Bas, F de, and J. De T'Serclaes de Wommersom (1908–1909). La campagne de 1815 aux Pays-Bas d'après les rapports officiels néerlandais. Tomes: I: Quatre-Bras. II: Waterloo. III: Annexes et notes. IV: supplément: cartes et plans. Paris: Librairie Plon.
  - Bas, François de (1908). Tôme I: Quatre-Bras (in French).
  - Bas, François de (1908). Tôme II: Waterloo (in French).
  - Bas, François de (1908). Tôme III: Annexes et notes (in French).
- Ten Raa, F.J.G. and F. de Bas (1911–1950). Het Staatsche Leger, 1568–1795. Breda.
