= Mesas de Ibor =

Mesas de Ibor, Spain
- municipality
- Flag Coat of arms
- Interactive map of Mesas de Ibor, Spain
- Coordinates: 39°42′N 6°42′W
- Country: Spain
- Autonomous community: Extremadura
- Province: Cáceres
- Municipality: Mesas de Ibor

Area
  - Total: 49 km^{2} (19 sq mi)
- Elevation: 487 m (1,598 ft)

Population (2025-01-01)
  - Total: 146
  - Density: 3.0/km^{2} (7.7/sq mi)
- Time zone: UTC+1 (CET)
  - Summer (DST): UTC+2 (CEST)

Mesas de Ibor is a municipality located in the province of Cáceres, Extremadura, Spain. According to the 2005 census (INE), the municipality has a population of 204 inhabitants.

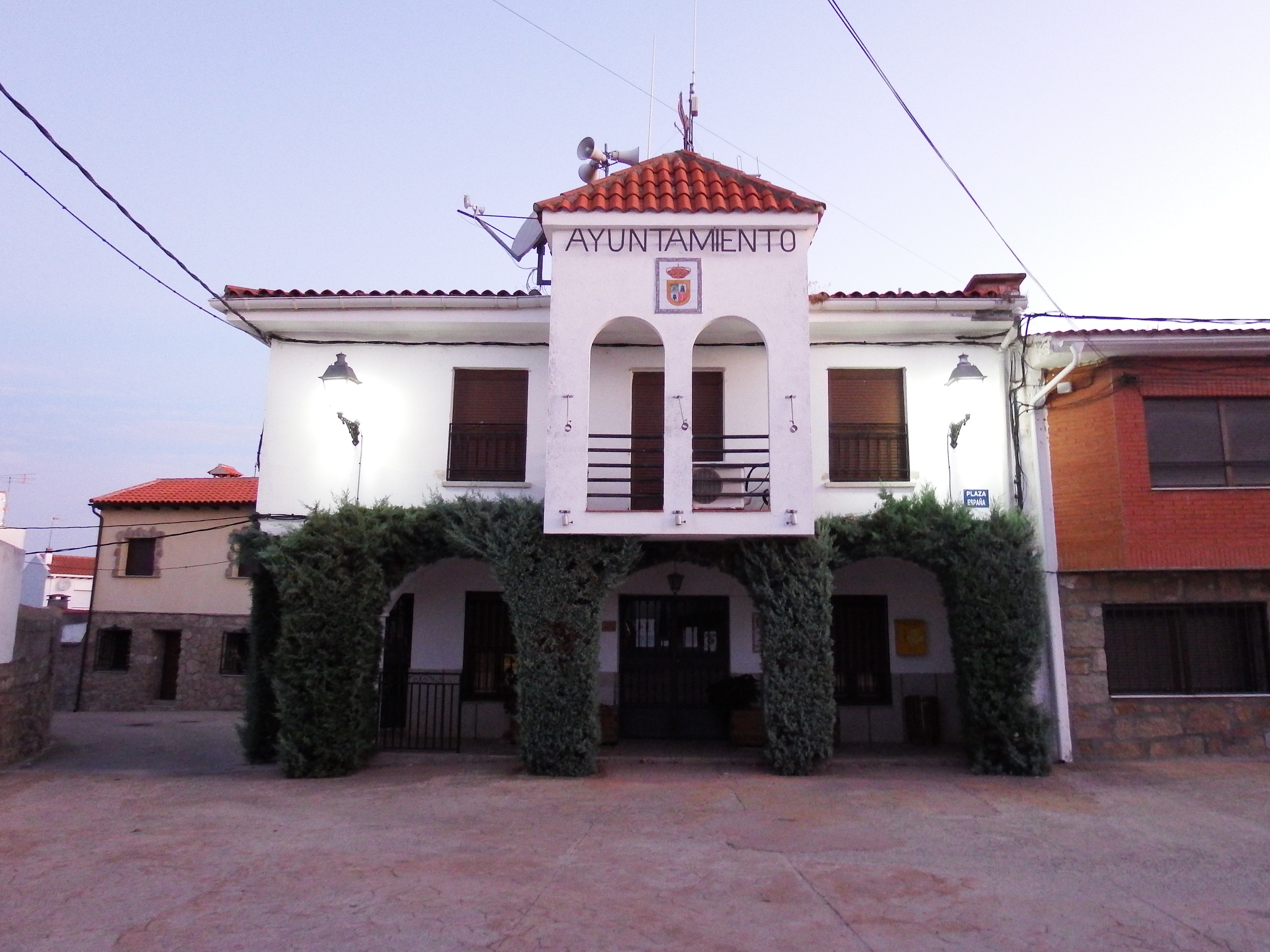
Mesas de Ibor Town Hall Building

== See also ==
- List of municipalities in Cáceres
