= Order of battle =

Organized description of an armed force

An order of battle describes an armed force participating in a military operation or campaign shows the hierarchical organization, command structure, strength, disposition of personnel, and equipment of units and formations of the armed force. Various abbreviations are in use, including OOB, O/B, or OB, while ORBAT remains the most common in the United Kingdom. An order of battle is distinct from a table of organisation, which is the intended composition of a given unit or formation according to the military doctrine of its armed force. Historically, an order of battle was the order in which troops were positioned relative to the position of the army commander or the chronological order in which ships were deployed in naval situations.

As combat operations develop during a campaign, orders of battle may be revised and altered in response to the military needs and challenges. Also the known details of an order of battle may change during the course of executing the commanders' after action reports and/or other accounting methods (e.g. despatches) as combat assessment is conducted.

== Components ==
The contents of an order of battle vary according to purpose, period and level of command. A detailed order of battle may include a formation's title, type, higher headquarters, subordinate units, commanders, personnel strength, major equipment, home station, operational location, attachments, support units and changes in organization. Historical orders of battle may also record formation dates, redesignations, losses, refitting, destruction, surrender or absorption into another unit.

== Historical approaches ==
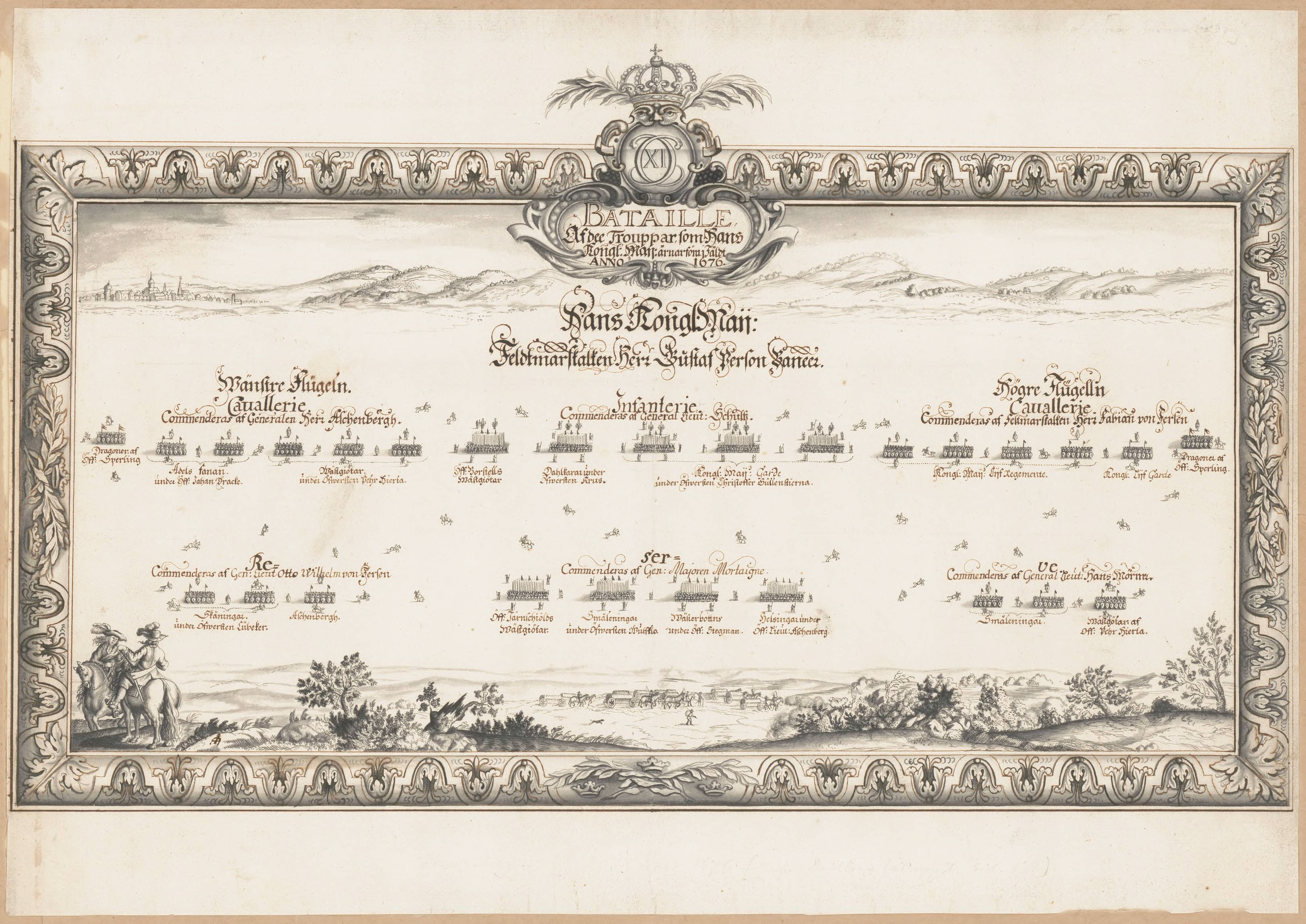
Order of battle for the Swedish Army in 1676.

In its original form during the Medieval period of European warfare, an order of battle was the order in which troops were positioned relative to the position of the army commander. The term was also applied to the disposition of ships in the line of battle during the Age of Sail. In the later transformation of its meaning during the European period of Early Modern warfare the order of battle came to mean the order in which the units manoeuvered or deployed onto the battlefield to form battle-lines, with the positioning on the right considered the place of greatest honour. This need to reflect the unit seniority led to the keeping of military staff records, in tabular form reflecting the compilation of units an army, their commanders, equipment, and locations on the battlefield.

During the Napoleonic wars the meaning of the order of battle changed yet again to reflect the changes in the composition of opposing forces during the battle owing to use of larger formations than in the previous century. Napoleon also instituted the staff procedure of maintaining accurate information about the composition of the enemy order of battle, and tables of organisation, and this later evolved into an important function and an organisational tool used by military intelligence to analyse enemy capability for combat.

=== British historical approach ===
British military history is the source of some of the earliest orders of battle in the English language, and due to the British Empire's involvement in global conflicts over several centuries the records of historical orders of battle provide a valuable source of study for understanding not only of the composition, but also of tactics and doctrines of the forces through their depiction in the orders of battle. In British military usage, the abbreviation ORBAT is commonly used for an order of battle. British defence publications use the term in relation to force composition, operational planning and instructional.

During the Napoleonic Wars, British orders of battle recorded field organization by command grouping as well as by unit. For the Battle of Talavera, Charles Oman's appendix lists the British force and Battle of Talavera order of battle from the morning state of 25 July 1809 under cavalry, infantry divisions, brigades, battalions, artillery, engineers and staff corps, with totals for those present and fit for duty.

Operation Quicksilver, part of the British deception plan for the Invasion of Normandy in World War II, fed German intelligence a combination of true and false information about troop deployments in Britain, causing the Germans to deduce an order of battle which suggested an invasion at the Pas-de-Calais instead of Normandy.

=== Clausewitz ===
Clausewitz defined the "order of battle" as "that division and formation of the different arms into separate parts, or sections, of the whole Army, and that form of general position or disposition of those parts which is to be the norm throughout the whole campaign or war."

- Division comes from the permanent peacetime organization of the Army, with certain parts such as battalions, squadrons, and batteries being formed into units of higher order up to the highest of all, the whole Army.
- Disposition comes from the tactics and how these troops are to be drawn up for the battle.

Normally these tactics are exercised in peace and cannot be essentially modified when war breaks out. Order of battle belongs more to tactics than strategy. Clausewitz also noted that the order of battle depends on the effective span of control by a commander. Too few subunits makes an army unwieldy; too many subunits makes the "power of the superior will" weak; and in addition every step by which an order has to pass weakens its effect by loss of force and longer time of transmission. Clausewitz recommended that armies have no more than eight to ten subunits and subordinate corps four to six subunits.

=== United States Army ===
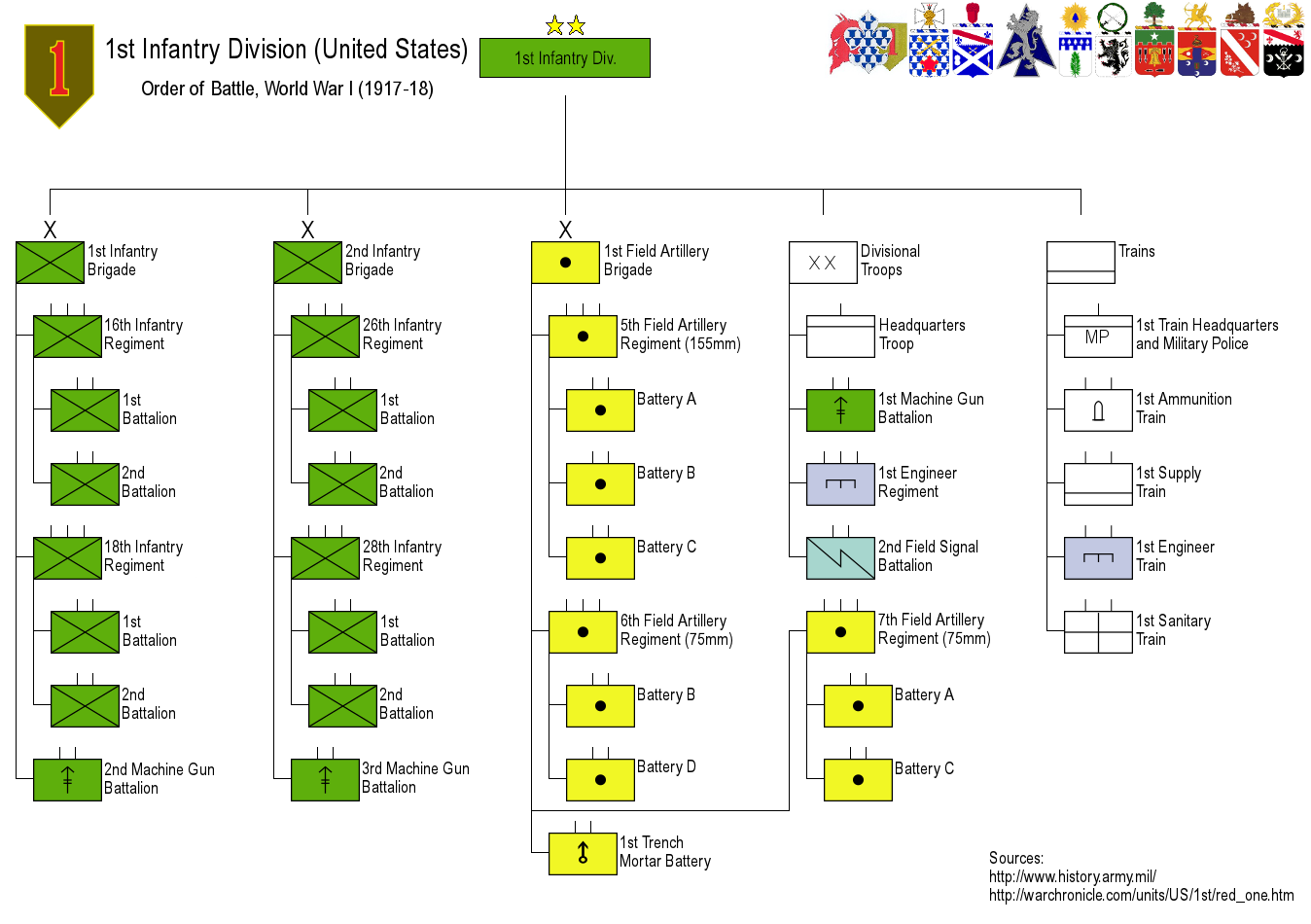
US 1st Infantry Division ORBAT during World War I

In United States Army standing operating procedures, an order of battle to be used for operations planning should relate what an Army unit might be expected to encounter while deployed in the field. The templating of the OoB during maneuvers is typically the responsibility of a battalion or brigade commander, conducted through their Headquarters S-2 (intelligence) sections. Observations about enemy troop movements may be gathered by various military intelligence resources from all echelons, including the employment of any attached special forces units (such as Rangers or LRS teams) as well as Cavalry RSTA squadrons.

From such intelligence data, the OOB section staff compiles a likely order of battle for a planning document or operations order by assessing the following factors:

Enemy's Composition, Disposition, Strength (often mnemonicized with SALUTE: Size, Activity, Location, Unit, Time, Equipment):

- Composition: the command structure and organisation of headquarters and subunits
- Disposition: geographical locations of unit headquarters and subunits
- Strength expressed in units and weight of fire delivered by its weapon systems

Enemy capabilities and limitations (often mnemonicized with DRAWD: Defend, Reinforce, Attack, Withdraw, Delay):

- Personnel training
- Logistics: how the enemy unit obtains its supplies and lines of communication
- Combat Effectiveness using complex algorithms and combat modelling applications
- Electronic Technical Data used to provide data for the combat modelling applications

Enemy's Most Likely Course of Action (EMLCOA):

- Tactics used by the enemy unit
- Miscellaneous data related to specific task, mission or operations

- Personalities (known enemy personnel and their behaviour, often based on communications intelligence analysis)
- Unit history used to judge expected performance based on its past performance
- Uniforms and insignia to enable confirmation of the above data

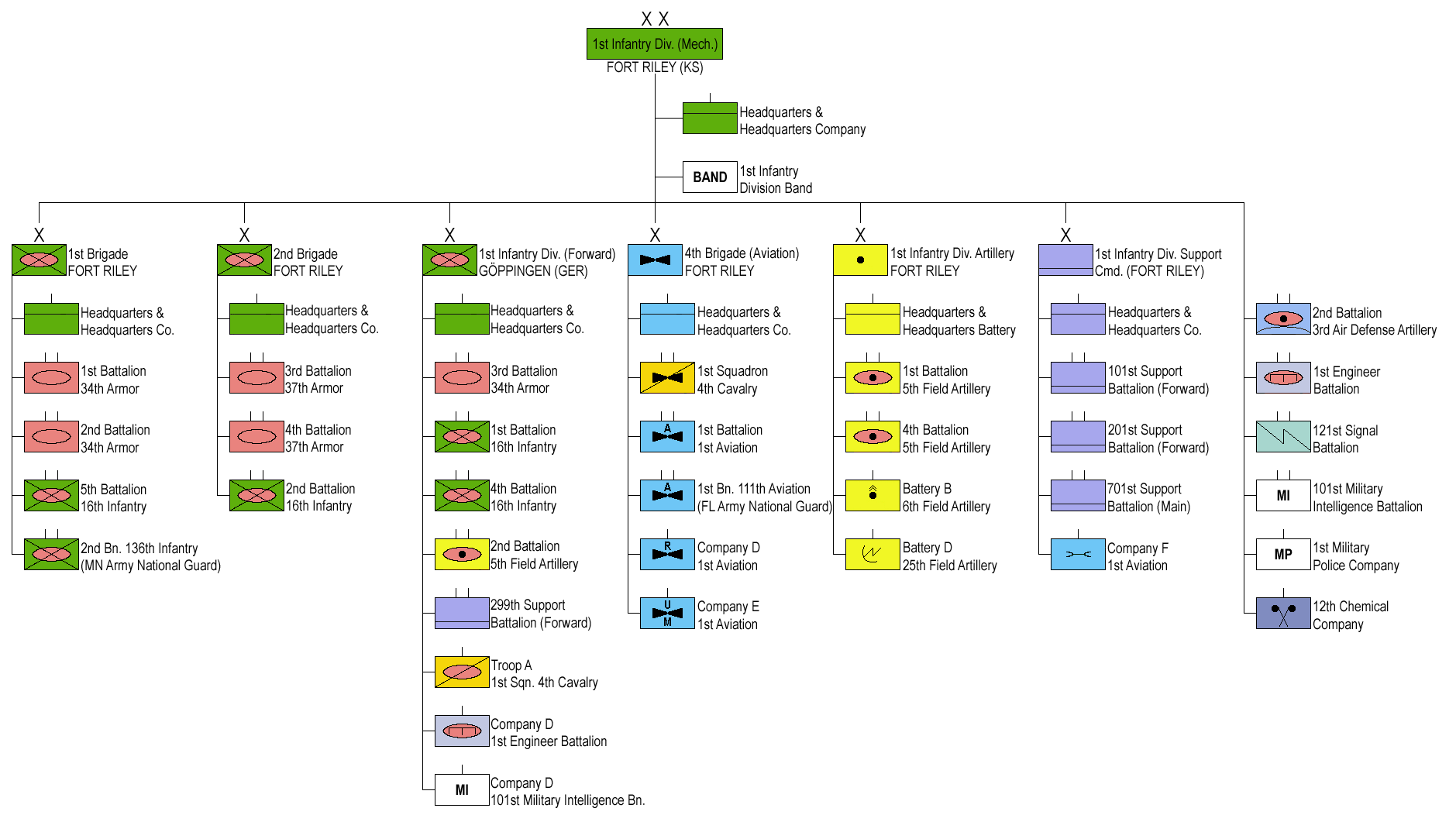
US 1st Infantry Division ORBAT in 1989

A general rule in American military doctrine is that each unit should keep track of enemy subunits two echelons below its own: that is, a division should monitor enemy units confronting it down to the battalion, a brigade should monitor enemy units down to companies, and a battalion should monitor enemy forces down to platoons.

The United States military's intelligence capabilities in the 21st century have allowed for monitoring even further than two echelons down the chain of command. This situational awareness provides a more complete picture of the battlespace for both combatant commanders and tactical commanders.

Up until the end of the Cold War, determining realistic orders of battle was generally an orderly but extremely frustrating process for NATO. The intelligence situation for Western militaries has since been exacerbated as they continue to become engaged in operations against non-traditional enemies (insurgents, guerrillas, etc.) and compiling orders of battle for irregular forces becomes very difficult; the equivalent military intelligence output requiring an increase in acquired data and analysis effort to provide an accurate and timely picture to the commander.

== Examples ==
An example of ORBATs in modern warfare can be found for German forces and Allied forces during the Normandy landings. Other examples include the Battle of Bình Giã during the Vietnam War and the Battle of Al Faw during the Iraq War.

== See also ==
- Electronic order of battle (EOB)
- Five paragraph order
- List of orders of battle
- Tactical formation
