= Forward air control operations during the Korean War =

Forward air controllers in the Korean War were prominent throughout the conflict. United Nations forces depended upon improvised U.S. forward air control systems. The United States military held two competing doctrines for directing close air support (CAS). The U.S. Marine Corps' system depended on an organic supporting air wing delivering ordnance within 1,000 yards of front-line troops; this was to compensate for their weakness in artillery caused by being an amphibious force. On the other hand, the U.S. Army believed close air support should extend the range of its own organic artillery; it also wanted its own air corps. However, the U.S. Air Force was tasked with supplying trained fighter pilots as forward air controllers (FACs), with the Army supplying equipment and personnel. As events fell out, the 1st Marine Air Wing supplied the FACs and air strikes for X Corps during the war, while 5th Air Force supplied FACs and strike support to 8th Army. There were awkward attempts at coordination between the two, and with carrier-borne air power, though with limited success.

Tactical air power, including CAS, was largely instrumental in staunching communist offensives as the opposing forces swept back and forth in mobile warfare. (See graphic below.) Notable from the beginning was the reinvention of the airborne FAC; the T-6 "Mosquitos" of the 6147th Tactical Control Group would fly 40,354 FAC sorties, be credited with killing 184,808 communist troops, and win two U.S. and one Korean Presidential Unit Citations. Though only United Nations air superiority from the earliest days of the war made "Mosquito" operations possible, other FACs also inflicted serious casualties on the communists.

However, forward air control techniques paid off in diminishing returns once the opposing sides settled into trench warfare. As both sides dug in à la World War I, the communists operated at night to avoid air attacks. The U.S. Air Force FAC effort experimented with Shoran-directed raids and radar-directed bombing as a counter to this.

Even as the FAC systems served crucial roles in combat, the turf war concerning doctrine continued unabated. There were at least eight attempts to alter the Army/Air Force FAC system during the Korean War, with no substantive result. At war's end, forward air control policies in the U.S. military remained unchanged from those at its start. By 1956, the Army/Air Force CAS system was defunct.

== Overview ==
The U.S. military codified their forward air control (FAC) experience from World War II in 1946, when the most recent edition of Field Manual 31–35 Air Ground Operations (FM 31–35) was issued for the U.S. Army. The Army Air Force organized its strategic bombers into the Strategic Air Command (SAC), and split its fighters into Air Defense Command (ADC), and Tactical Air Command (TAC). The latter was tasked with close air support (CAS), and thus with forward air control. The Air Force's doctrine, based on Second World War experience called for three necessary conditions for successful close air support. One was gaining air superiority over the enemy. Another was isolating the battlefield via interdiction strikes on a foe's lines of communication. The third was the delivery of air strikes via a forward air control system supporting the Army's ground forces. The Army tended to believe the latter was given the lowest priority by the Air Force and resented it. In 1947, the newly established U.S. Air Force also adopted FM 31–35. However, this failed to set a single forward air control system within the U.S. military. As part of the division of forces when the Air Force became independent, the U.S. Navy and U.S. Marine Corps kept their aviation components and their forward control systems. The Army kept its light liaison aircraft and the few helicopters of the era, but was still dependent on the Air Force for most air support, including forward air control.

== Background ==
Two different forward air control systems had emerged during World War II. The U.S. Army and its Air Corps had developed one system in the North African Campaign; the U.S. Navy and Marine Corps developed a different system in the Pacific Theater. The U.S. Army fought a conventional land war in North Africa, using its tactical air power to strike beyond the range of its artillery. The U.S. Marine fought an amphibious war as light infantry supported by little artillery fire; consequently, they directed air strikes on targets within 1,000 yards of their own forces.

The newly independent Air Force concentrated on possible future nuclear warfare. In November 1948, Tactical Air Command was eliminated as a separate command within the Air Force. Much of the fledgling Air Force's energies were caught up in turf wars with other branches of the U.S. military. The U.S. Army was angling for its own organic air power within its ranks, à la the U.S. Marines. When the U.S. Navy and Marines pointed out the utility of air strikes landing as close as artillery fire to protect friendly troops, the Air Force countered that the Marines had to use air strikes because they lacked artillery in amphibious assaults. The Air Force pledged trained fighter pilots as forward air controllers (FACs) to direct a joint CAS operation; the Army was tasked with supplying radio equipment, vehicles, and personnel for these Tactical Air Control Parties (TACP). This led to another point of disagreement. The Army claimed it should have input into the types of aircraft used in close air support strikes, and plumped for propeller-driven planes; the Air Force claimed the right to develop its weaponry unimpeded, and intended to develop jets into CAS aircraft.

During the late 1940s, the U.S. military tested its forward air control capabilities per FM 31–35 during several joint field maneuvers involving the Army and Air Force. During the maneuvers, radios used for coordinating air action were unreliable; radio nets were overwhelmed with traffic. When the controllers could be contacted, they often had no targets to offer. When they did, they struggled to handle more than a single flight at a time. The early jet aircraft used for close air support had a voracious appetite for fuel, a short radii of action, and a short linger time over target. The joint Army/Air Force FAC effort results compared poorly to the U.S. Marines' organic system; it obviously needed drastic improvement.

Korea was an unpromising venue for an air campaign. A peninsula about a third larger than Florida, its terrain was characterized by a web of monotonous blue-green mountains interlaced with numerous valleys and ravines. The highest peaks formed a rugged spine that would divide military campaigns into coastal movements on either side of the mountains. Forward air controllers, with so many similar terrain features to observe, would find themselves tricked into errors of identification. To complicate matters, unreliable maps available bore widespread mistakes and confusions in town names, and portrayed terrain features as far as 1,000 meters out of true.

During World War II, the Japanese had built ten airstrips in South Korea, but only two could handle modern aircraft. Korean meteorology was also inimical to easy air operations. Because the weather fronts moved southward over North Korea into the war zone, the communists had the advantage of a figurative weather gage for their military planning.

== The shooting war ==
=== Retreat to the Pusan perimeter ===
When North Korea invaded South Korea on 25 June 1950 to begin the Korean War, the only air control system in Korea was tasked to direct air to air combat. There were no forward air control units in Korea. The U.S. Air Force's only Tactical Air Control Group was in the U.S. So was the U.S. Army's 20th Signal Company, which was the only American unit capable of running an air communications network.

Territory often changed hands early in the war, until the front stabilized. North Korean and Chinese forces South Korean, American, Commonwealth and United Nations forces

Nevertheless, two Air Force Tactical Air Control Parties arrived in theater within the war's first week. Over 60% of the air strikes flown in the first month of the war—some 3,251 sorties—beefed up the scanty artillery support of American and South Korean ground forces. American communication nets in Korea were so overloaded that close air support operations were hindered. At times, senior officers even desperately resorted to personal telephone calls to Japan to request air strikes. Without guidance, many tactical sorties became a hunt for targets of opportunity. Even B-29 Superfortresses were pressed into close air support, though with little effect.

General Partridge's solution for channeling air strike requests was to send SC-399 radios with operators to every Air Liaison Officer at an Army divisional headquarters, improvising an ad hoc air communications net that would eventually develop into the 6147th Tactical Control Group (6147th TCG) of airborne FACs. He also established a Joint Operations Center (JOC) on 5 July 1950, per doctrine. Meanwhile, on 14 July, the 6132d Tactical Air Control Group (Provisional) was formed as a ground FAC unit. On 23 July, it established a bare-bones Tactical Air Control Center without radar; it served as a radio net for the JOC, under the call sign "Mellow Control". It also assumed control of all TACPs in country. Liaison was established with the 1st Marine Aircraft Wing; any air strikes "excess" to support of marine ground units also were directed through "Mellow Control". In a cumbersome makeshift, naval aviation strikes had to be coordinated through U.S. Navy headquarters in Japan.

Despite being jury-rigged, the air control system played a great role in staving off American defeat in the first few months of the war. General William F. Dean said it was crucial in standing off the North Korean attacks. General William B. Kean told journalists after one hard-fought battle where his forces were supported by 108 sorties of tactical air, "The close air support strikes by the Fifth Air Force again saved this (25th) Division, as they have done many times before." General Walton Walker fervently agreed.

On 17, 19, and 20 July 1950, forward air controllers directed 5th Air Force fighter pilots in successful aerial interceptions that destroyed some of the last usable Yakovlev Yak-9s of the North Korean Air Force. With the North Korean air threat then roundly defeated, the United Nations established the superiority necessary for ongoing successful forward air control and close air support efforts.

During 1950, the 6147th Tactical Control Group operated as far as 50 miles into enemy territory, using relay aircraft to remain in radio contact.

==== Return of the airborne FAC ====
Airborne forward air controllers merited a single dismissive sentence in FM 31–35. Nevertheless, two weeks into the war, Lieutenant Colonel Stanley P. Latiolas, operations officer of the Fifth Air Force, suggested having a slower airplane spot targets for the fuel-hog jets. Colonel John R. Murphy, familiar with the Horsefly FACs of World War II, asked General Earle E. Partridge for five pilots to fly reconnaissance. On 9 July 1950, Lieutenants James A. Bryant and Frank G. Mitchell flew the first airborne FAC missions of the Korean War from K-5 Taejon Air Base. They flew into K-5 with two Stinson L-5 Sentinels modified with needed VHF radios—which promptly became inoperable. Borrowing two 24th Division L-17 Navions, the lieutenants contacted surprised fighter pilots and directed about 10 flights of F-80s in air strikes.

The advent of airborne FACs was a timely one. The other four TACPs of the 620th Aircraft Control and Warning Squadron had joined its original two parties in ground forward air control as the U.S. military scrambled to form TACPs. Their utility was limited because the FAC had to remain with his MRC108 radio jeep while ordering air strikes, making a very visible target for enemy shellfire. The radios were fragile, and they were easily damaged by jolting and vibration. By 11 July 1950, only three of the radio jeeps were still working.

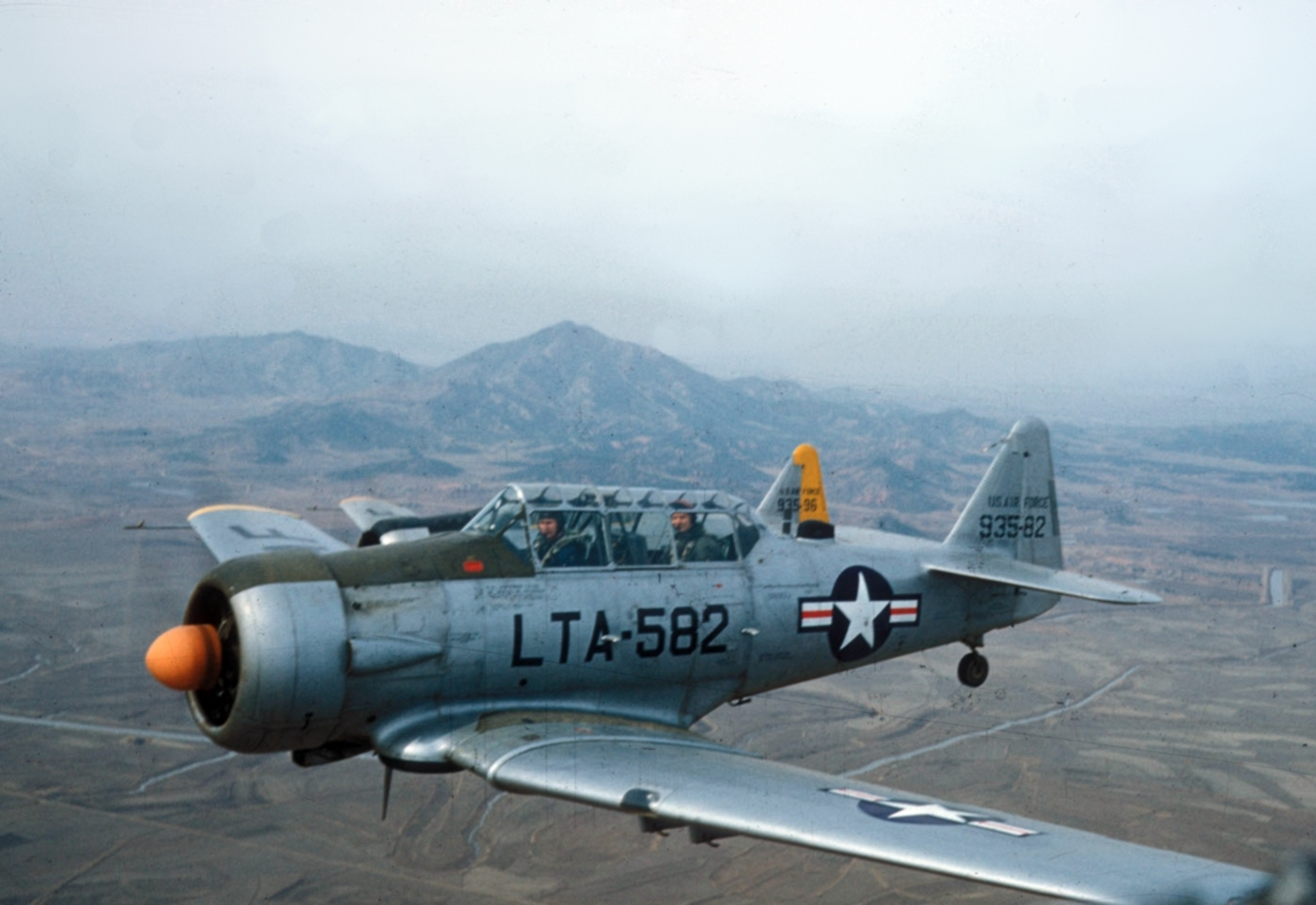
Two USAF LT-6Gs of the 6147th TCG used for forward air control in Korea.

The following day saw the first use of a T-6 Texan for a FAC aircraft, as the original FACs flew a sortie directing air strikes by Lockheed P-80 Shooting Stars that knocked out 17 North Korean tanks near Chonui. During the direction of Royal Australian Air Force P-51 Mustangs, the T-6 radio became unserviceable. The FAC continued indicating targets by flying over them and rocking his wings. The resulting strikes were the first of many successful attacks made without radio contact, as United Nations bombers operated on many non-compatible radio frequencies. The T-6 became the standard FAC aircraft for Korean use, although others were considered.

Although the T-6 entered the FAC role as a "hot" aircraft, it was soon encumbered with numerous adaptations that degraded its performance. With a load that included a long-range belly tank, smoke grenades, and a dozen smoke rockets added under each wing for marking targets adding half a ton of added weight, the T-6 was limited to a top speed of 100 mph (160 km/h), and its service ceiling was considerably reduced. The T-6's low wing restricted view and its lowered performance was a detriment to its role in forward air control. The 6147th tested the L-19, later known as the O-1 Bird Dog. However, it offered no better performance than the Texan and its lack of armor left it vulnerable to ground fire. There was also an abortive attempt to use the L-17 Navion as a FAC aircraft. The Navion's low wing design precluded much success in observation. However, the T-6s did not go unscathed, as 20 were lost in action by December 1950.

Several of the smaller, slower liaison planes were shot down by North Korean Yaks—including 6 Navion L-17s—and they were withdrawn from action. Fifth Air Force also turned to higher performance aircraft for the FAC mission. P-51 Mustangs and F4U Corsairs were used to penetrate enemy air space after it had become too hazardous for T-6s.

=== From Inchon to the Yalu River ===
General Edward Almond used the 1st Marine Aircraft Wing and naval aviation from supporting aircraft carriers to provide close air support for his X Corps landing at Inchon in September 1950. His air campaign was managed through the U.S. Navy's Combat Information Center, which coordinated with the 5th Air Force's Joint Operations Center. All nine battalions of the 1st Marine Division had a Marine FAC attached to headquarters. Fifth Air Force had done the same for the battalions of the U.S. Army's Seventh Division.

Despite the difficult tide and port conditions, the landing succeeded with support of naval tactical air. With United Nations ground forces both before and behind the North Korean Army, the latter fled northwards. By 22 September the routed North Korean units had lost unit cohesion and become easy targets for tactical air strikes. By 25 September, identification of the enemy from the air became difficult as they scattered. Meanwhile, three detachments of the 3903rd Radar Bomb Scoring Group and the 1st Shoran Beacon Unit arrived in Korea with the aim of beginning a radar bombing program.

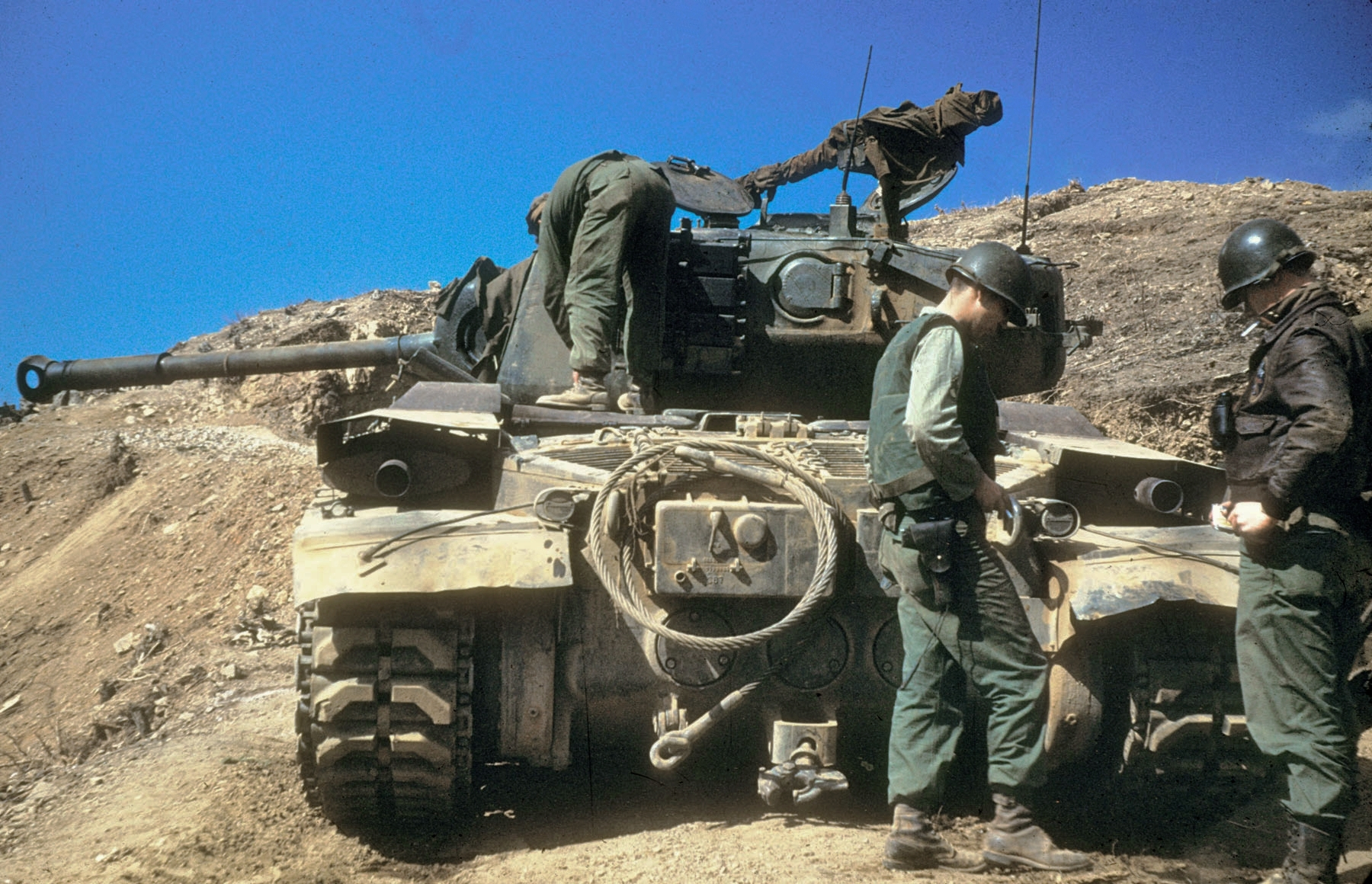
USAF forward air controller (right) consults with a U.S. Army officer beside a radio-equipped M46 tank in Korea.

On 13 October 1950, Fifth Air Force moved its Joint Operations Center forward to Seoul. The 502d TCG arrived for duty, and absorbed the provisional 6132d TCG. Nevertheless, communications between the JOC and tactical fighter wings remained problematic. Another problem hindering forward air control was inadequate aerial photography coverage for intelligence purposes.

Having previously been driven to night operations by air strikes, the North Korean forces now basically dissolved. Almost half of their casualties—estimated at about 50,000 killed—had been inflicted by American tactical air strikes. About three quarters of their tanks, artillery pieces, and trucks were also destroyed by air attacks. And while lines of communication had not been entirely cut, they were severely disrupted, causing delays in supplies needed.

=== Chinese intervention ===
The United Nations drive northward approached the Yalu River and the Korean/Chinese border as October ended. Communist Chinese "volunteers" under General Lin Biao launched massive ground assaults on the UN forces, driving them back to the south. The Chinese Air Force periodically raided into Korea, before retreating into the sanctuary of airfields in Manchuria. Chinese MiG-15s appeared; their air combat superiority to any UN aircraft rapidly became apparent. Their "Allied Joint Headquarters" at Antung was supposed to direct Chinese and North Korean air efforts; however, it was run by Russian advisers. In turn, the U.S. introduced F-86 Sabre jets into Korea as a counter to the Mig-15s. Successful Sabre pilots reported seeing Caucasian pilots eject from failing MiGs.

During November 1950, the United Nations 8th Army reeled southwards along Korea's western coast. X Corps fought its way south along the country's eastern coast. The UN retreat was supported by all-out tactical air operations. Task Force 77 (TF 77) began liaison with the 5th Air Force Joint Operations Center, though inadequate communications hampered naval aviation efforts. The Chinese ground forces, having never before fought an enemy supported by an air force, exposed themselves to air attacks en masse as they rushed after the retreating UN troops. During early December, air power alone opposed communist progress, as air strikes inflicted severe casualties on their troops advancing in the open.

Nevertheless, the Chinese communists and the resuscitated North Korean Army pushed United Nations forces southward from Seoul. They were unsupported by the Chinese Air Force, which maintained air superiority in northwestern Korea. On 31 December, the communist ground forces launched an all-out offensive. Unfortunately for them, the first five days of 1951 offered crystal clear flying weather. On 1 and 2 January, the UN's Tactical Air Control Center handled fighter-bomber flights arriving over the front lines at ten-minute intervals; 60% of these flights struck with close air support for UN forces. By 3 January, most tactical sorties were seeking targets of opportunity well behind communist lines. By 5 January, the USAF estimated it had killed nearly 8,000 communist soldiers in five days; 8th Army thought the casualty count was twice that. By 25 January 1951, the UN forces had been pushed back to a line somewhat north of the 37th parallel of latitude. At dawn that day, UN troops counterattacked. An 8th Army intelligence report issued the following day estimated communist casualties at 38,000 killed; 18,820 of those dead were credited to tactical air strikes. Without their own air support, the communists had begun their withdrawal to the 38th parallel on 15 January. "Mosquito" FACs of the 6147th TCG began spotting concentrations of retreating communist troops on 30 January. Approximately 1 February 1951, General Peng Dehuai relieved an ailing Lin Biao from command. On 16 February, Peng ordered the Fourth Field Army to hold a line approximating the 38th parallel until May, when they were expected to counterattack.

The "Mosquito" T-6 FACs were parceled out to ground divisions and corps, and flew cover for those units in a series of UN offensives, such as Operation Thunderbolt, Operation Killer, and Operation Ripper. The close air support furnished was effective. In one notable incident, on 3 February 1951, ten tactical air sorties directed by "Mosquito Cobalt" near Yang-pyong killed an estimated 300 communists. In another combat on 12 February, "Mosquito Liberator" controlled three flight of fighter-bombers that blasted a trapped South Korean battalion free of communist road-blocks. On 22 February, east of Seoul, the communists suffered an estimated 1,000 casualties from 11 flights of tactical air directed by "Mosquito Lawsuit". Advancing UN troops found the landscape littered with enemy corpses in shallow graves or in the open.

In February, as the communist retreat lessened the need for close air support and increased ground fire opposed FAC aircraft, UN forward air control efforts turned toward interdiction of supplies before they could reach the Chinese and Korean units. In January, air strikes destroyed 599 communist trucks and damaged 683. The 5th Air Force established an aerial cordon in the foe's rear, 50 miles north of the bomb line, in mid-February. It consisted of three targeting areas, each assigned its own air wing for armed reconnaissance coverage. Constant rotating coverage by P-51 Mustangs and F4U Corsairs helped the FAC pilots become familiar with their areas, and thus quicker to spot and attack enemy activity. On the second day of this operation, February 13, fighter-bombers destroyed 236 communist vehicles, setting a one-day record for vehicle bomb damage assessment. February truck "kills" soared to 1,366 destroyed, 812 damaged.

March 1951 saw United Nations forces counterattacking back northwards. Once again finding communist troops in large bands in the open, forward air controllers directed deadly air strikes on them. In mid-March, the communist withdrawal came under heavy air attack averaging over 1,000 daily sorties daily, as the UN forces moved north. For example, two "Mosquito Granite" FACs set six flights of fighter-bombers on a fleeing mob of 1,200 communists on 16 March near Hongchon. The U.S 7th Division swept through soon afterwards, finding 600 bodies and 300 wounded.

On 23 March, four TACPs parachuted into battle with the 187th Regimental Combat Team at Munsan-ni as a blocking force behind the communists. "Mosquito" T-6s directed 108 sorties of protective close air support on the nearby enemy, while Task Force Growden pushed northwards to squeeze the communists. The UN forces once again established themselves along the 38th parallel.

While awaiting the long-ballyhooed communist spring offensive, the U.S. improved its forward air control procedures. Lacking the institutional memory to recall prior experience during World War II, the Americans reinvented all-weather bombing and night FAC operations. Newer radio jeeps with 12 channels replaced the older ones that had only four. Ordnance specialists began loading proximity fused bombs matched to specific targets. Forward airfields were opened to stage aircraft closer to the enemy. When the communist offensive began on 22 April 1951, the 337,000 attacking troops disregarded UN air power and paid a heavy price for it. Tactical aviation from three aircraft carriers became available for close air support on 18 May. In mid-May, radar guided night air strikes killed communist troops within 400 yards of the U.S. 2nd Division, to General Almond's delight. However, even with copious air support, the UN forces gave ground until the communist attack petered out. Then they counter-attacked. Although they drove the communists back, for the first time the latter did not withdraw out of artillery range as usual to regroup, but clung in place. On 1 July 1951, North Korean Premier Kim Il Sung and General Peng Te-huai agreed to a cease fire as both sides settled into fixed positions. As the communists dug in, there were fewer and less worthy targets vulnerable to tactical air strikes.

Far East Air Force (FEAF) summarized its accomplishments after a year of war. Although it did not categorize results, a considerable portion of the cited 120,000 communist casualties were inflicted by FAC directed close air support. FAC losses can be more closely estimated; they are contained in the "other" category of FEAF aircraft losses, which numbered 17. North Korean General Nam Il later remarked, during armistice negotiations, that only U.S air power and naval gunfire had prevented his side from prevailing.

=== Static warfare ===
During Summer 1951, the two opposing sides settled into their own growing network of trenches a la World War I, and the forward air control situation changed. As the communists dug in, they operated only at night, and there were fewer and less worthy targets vulnerable to tactical air strikes. Even as forward air control was less successful in finding suitable enemy targets, United Nations air forces allied with the USAF—the British air force, British navy, Australians, South Africans, Greeks, and Thais—flew a large proportion of the CAS missions.

On 25 July 1951, the FAC system was given an additional task for which it was ill-fitted. Because of the increased threat from the communist air forces, it was assigned air defense responsibilities. Tactical air direction centers would not only detect inbound enemy aircraft, but control protective night interceptors and anti-aircraft batteries. This was a makeshift measure, as the FAC radars had only a 75-mile range, leaving serious gaps in coverage.

Previously, the UN bombers had flown some interdiction missions against enemy lines of communication—principally rail lines. Beginning 18 August 1951, as forward air control demands diminished and the bombers began seeking more lucrative targets, much tactical air was diverted to interdiction bombing campaigns such as Operation Strangle, which was aimed at North Korea's lines of communications. However, 96 sorties per day were routinely reserved for close air support of the 8th Army, with more sorties on call. On 2 September 1951, UN offensive operations in the Punchbowl vicinity kicked off. During the month of September, 5th Air Force flew 2,451 CAS sorties; 1,664 of those were flown in support of X Corps.

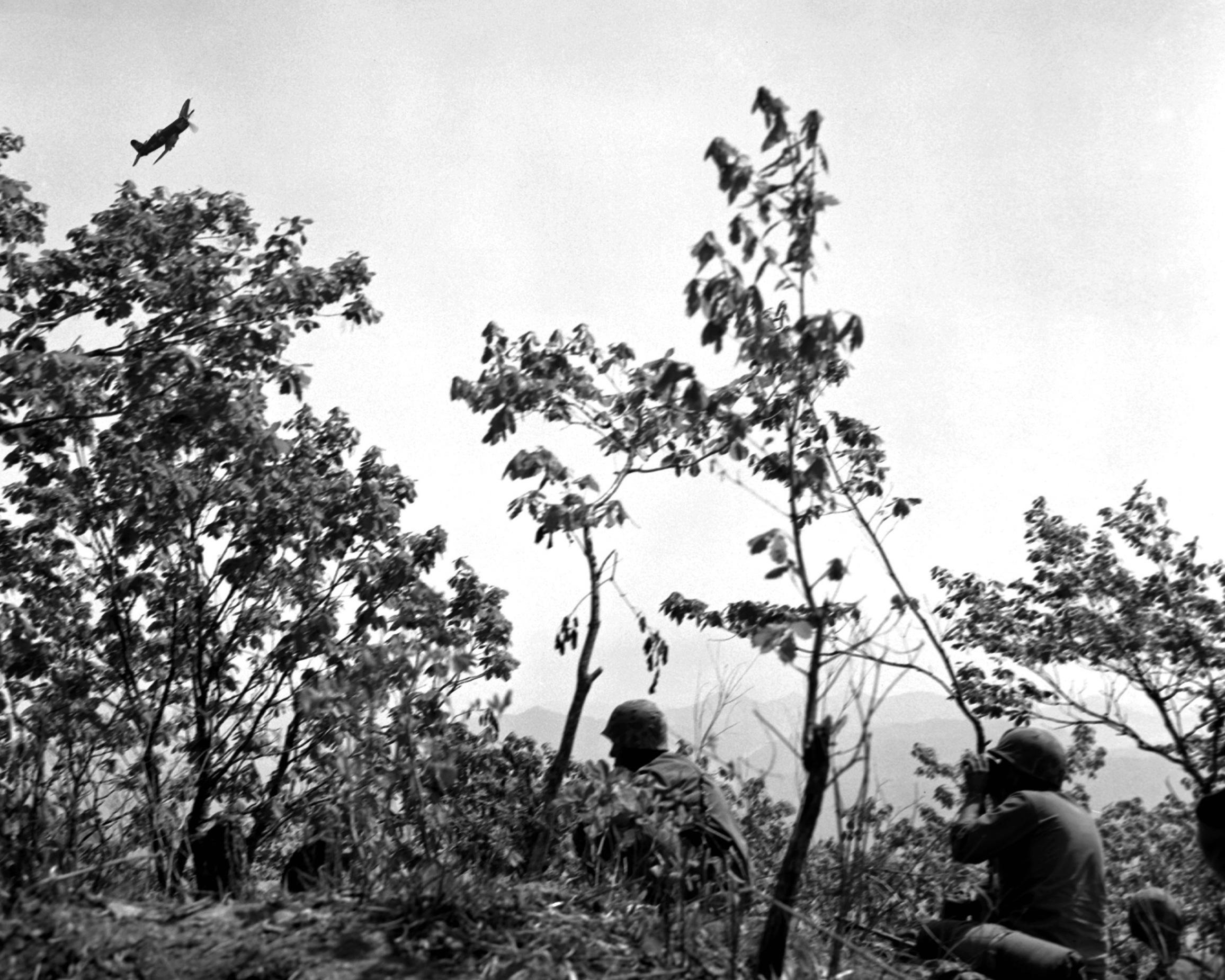
U.S. Marine Corps forward air controllers in action in Korea in 1951. They are observing effects of an air strike by a Corsair.

On 1 September 1951, the Chinese Air Force—now suddenly one of the world's largest due to Soviet aid—kicked off a campaign to regain air superiority over North Korea. Although an inexperienced air force, flying with no set tactical doctrine, their 525 MiG-15s outnumbered FEAF's 89 F-86 Sabres by a six to one margin. MiG-15 formations emerging from their Manchurian sanctuary could number up to 90 planes. Being able to fly higher than the F-86s, MiG-15s would hang above UN aircraft before choosing to attack with an advantage. On 25 September, a UN reconnaissance plane spotted an advanced 7,000-foot-long airfield for MiGs being built near Saamchan, North Korea. Two other airstrips under construction were spotted on 14 October, close enough to the original one that aircraft from one field could defend all three. If the communists succeeded in manning these fields, they would have air superiority all the way south to Pyongyang. These three fields were targeted for B-29 raids. The three airfields were cratered into disuse, but B-29 losses were severe enough that they switched to night operations to reduce casualties. By mid-December 1951, it became apparent the communists had lost their attempt at air superiority.

As the North Korean air defenses became increasingly dangerous to the "Mosquito" FACs, the FACs limited their incursions over enemy ground to a couple of miles. Beginning 1 October, the 6147th TCG was assigned FAC pilots on a permanent basis, as the temporary duty system being used degraded pilot efficiency. By October 1951, the UN forces had switched to defensive mode as both sides settled in awaiting the results of truce talks. Forward air control became a matter of routinely striking enemy fortifications, usually with little result. Demand for FACs should have slackened. However, UN divisional commanders felt they "owned" the right to close air support missions, and continued to demand their perceived share of strike sorties.

By March 1952, UN pilot experience with close air support had dwindled to the point that 90% of one fighter group pilots had never flown a CAS sortie. Subsequent rotation of assignments gave all the fighter-bomber squadrons CAS experience. Tactical air strikes on the communist front line positions were of minimal use; however, the training preserved CAS capability for the forward air controllers to direct in case of a renewed offensive by the communists. However, the ever-increasing hazard to the aerial "Mosquito" forward air controllers led to changes. On 20 July 1952, experimentation began with aerial pathfinders. Two experienced pilots would depart before the main formation to spot targets, and fly the initial strike to mark them. Re-investigation of radar bombing techniques also began.

As truce talks continued, communist "land grab" attacks became common. By July 1953, the final month's fighting, the 6147th TCG was keeping as many as 28 "Mosquito" T-6s on forward air control duties simultaneously. On 12 July 1953, the Air Force Joint Operations Center finally established secure trustworthy communications via Radioteletype between itself and the Navy's Task Force 77. A naval liaison officer was also stationed at the JOC. By combat's end, the communists had lost an estimated 72,000 men in their final offensive.

== The turf war ==
As noted above, conditions were set from the start for a turf war. On 5 July 1950, General Partridge assigned 10 officers and 35 enlisted men to a Joint Operations Center (JOC) in accordance with FM 31–35. Located in Taejon, the JOC was ready to receive air strike requests from the U.S. Army. However, the Army side of the JOC went unmanned; there was no Army Air Ground Operations System gathering air strike requests and submitting them to the Air Force side of the JOC. General Almond did not forward any liaison to the JOC; however, he demanded TACPs be assigned to every one of the battalions in his command, when he knew that was impossible.

On 14 July 1950, Almond formed his own targeting section in his headquarters, to compete with the Air Force target system. On 23 July, General Otto P. Weyland, who had commanded forward air control support for General George S. Patton during World War II, submitted a memo claiming that Almond's targeting section was incompetent. In a staff meeting the following day, Almond unsuccessfully tried to intimidate Weyland into changing his views. Though Almond's targeting section was dissolved on 2 August, it was emblematic of his belief that forward air control was the least of the Air Force's concerns. Almond's belief that tactical air squadrons should be parceled out to support individual infantry divisions harked back to the doctrine of early World War II. Almond largely commandeered the 1st Marine Air Wing and its auxiliary U.S. Navy aviation to fly close air support for his X Corps.

When Partridge reported the JOC situation to MacArthur's headquarters on 9 August, he was later informed by MacArthur that the improvised system sufficed for the present. When Partridge visited X Corps in November, he found both Almond and his staff unknowledgeable of FM 31–35.

An investigative team headed by U.S. Army Brigadier General Gerald G. Higgins was dispatched to Korea in late Autumn 1950. After widespread interviews with commanders from battalion level upwards, the team concluded the existing field expedient system was effective. It noted that proper communications nets were lacking, and personnel had not been thoroughly trained in forward air control techniques. They also calculated that supporting every Army division with 216 aircraft per Marine Corps practice was financially impossible. The Higgins report, which pointed out Army deficiencies, was ignored when Almond submitted a report more favorably received by higher headquarters.

In the meantime, back in Washington DC during October 1950, Army Chief of Staff General J. Lawton Collins submitted a memorandum to his Air Force counterpart, General Hoyt Vandenberg outlining Army complaints with the forward air control system and plumping for parceling close air support aircraft to its divisions. A month later, General Almond reported from Korea; his requests for improvements echoed that of Collins. During the same time frame, an Air Force team headed by General Glenn O. Barcus noted that the army's nonparticipation in the JOC hobbled close air support efforts. The Barcus report also contained suggestions to improve the Air Force participation in CAS.

In early 1951, a joint Army and Air Force board met under the chairmanship of Army Brigadier General J. J. Burns. Meeting in Taegu, where the JOC and 8th Army headquarters were collocated, the board issued its report on 26 March 1951. It characterized the ongoing tactical air support as both "applicable" and "sound and adequate" for Korean operations. Although the Army representatives on the board thought Tactical Air Control Parties should be stationed down to battalion level, they recognized it was impossible under the circumstances. In the absence of TACPs equipped with VHF radios, and with inadequate communications nets, the best a TACP could do was collocate with a regimental headquarters and coordinate air strikes with the organic artillery. The Army representatives also complained there weren't enough "Mosquito" airborne FACs to keep one stationed over every Army division during daylight.

On 2 September 1951, UN offensive operations in the vicinity of the Punchbowl kicked off. Despite his parent X Corps being supported by two-thirds of the CAS sorties flown, Marine General Gerald C. Thomas believed his 1st Division was shortchanged. On 2 October, he complained and claimed his division needed 40 of the 96 sorties of CAS allocated every day. It was pointed out to him that when Marine pilots checked in with the JOC that they were forwarded to support Marine ground units as much as possible, and that he received on-call support from Air Force sorties.

On 17 December 1951, Army General James Van Fleet complained to 5th Air Force that his three corps commanders did not control their air assets. On 20 December, in a letter to General Matthew Ridgway, Van Fleet wanted a Marine squadron parceled out to each corps; they would fly "close interdiction" missions within 40 miles of the front under control of Army artillery observers.

With changes in the UN high command, the turf war renewed. On 1 July 1952, Army General Mark Clark turned down Van Fleet's proposal. After stating that he had not assumed command in Korea to aggravate Army-Air Force contentions over forward air control, he reviewed the ongoing dispute. On 11 August, he issued a command letter urging improvement of the current system. This led to increased indoctrination and training in the air-ground system, as well as experimentation with Pathfinder missions, and improvements in radar-controlled bombing. The objection to attaching squadrons to ground units was that increased casualties among the dedicated CAS squadrons would soon lead to their ineffectiveness.

Beginning 26 December 1952, Clark had operational demonstrations of close air support directed in the area of operations of each U.S. division in Korea. The USAF briefed and directed the tactical air strikes, but learned little from them. Air Force officers protested the unnecessary risk of life in these demonstrations. On 25 January 1953, the 7th Division staged a live fire exercise against T-Bone Hill as part of a CAS demonstration. The raid brought back no prisoners, and two attacking platoons suffered 64 casualties. When this news hit American newspapers, public outcry ensued. On 14 February 1953, the last demonstration was flown. Clark claimed the experiments had verified the utility of the FAC system.

== Legacy ==
In May 1953, a forward air control school began at Luke AFB; it was cancelled on 26 July when the Korean War ended. It had graduated 51 FACs.

By war's end, the United Nations air campaign had become so dependent on airborne FAC's directing strikes on targets invisible to ground FACs that the latter could go three months without directing a strike. The Mosquitoes flew through war's end, amassing 40,354 sorties, two Presidential Unit Citations, and a Korean Presidential Unit Citation. United Nations air forces had flown 96,210 close air support sorties (not including an unknown number for the U.S. Navy). UN air support was credited with killing 184,808 enemy troops. In turn, Far East Air Force suffered 1,144 killed in action. UN aircraft losses totaled 1,986.

As the fighting halted, a joint conference of the American Air Force, Army, Navy, and Marine Corps was held in Seoul to consider future forward air control operations. The U.S. Army still wanted its own Air Corps; the U.S. Air Force still insisted on its independence, and its ability to supply close air support as needed. The end of the Korean War saw no perceptible change in forward air control doctrine from the war's start. Matters continued post-1953 as they had in 1950; there would be no perceptible moves to settle forward air control doctrine for the U.S. military between 1946 and 1966.

The Mosquitoes were disbanded in 1956, as they were considered a wartime expedient. After their disbandment, the United States once again had no Forward Air Control capabilities. The 1957 STRICOM (U.S. Strike Command) Manual defined the forward air controller as ground bound. There would be no more airborne FACs until 1962.
