= Timothy F. O'Keefe =

United States Air Force general (1919–1984)

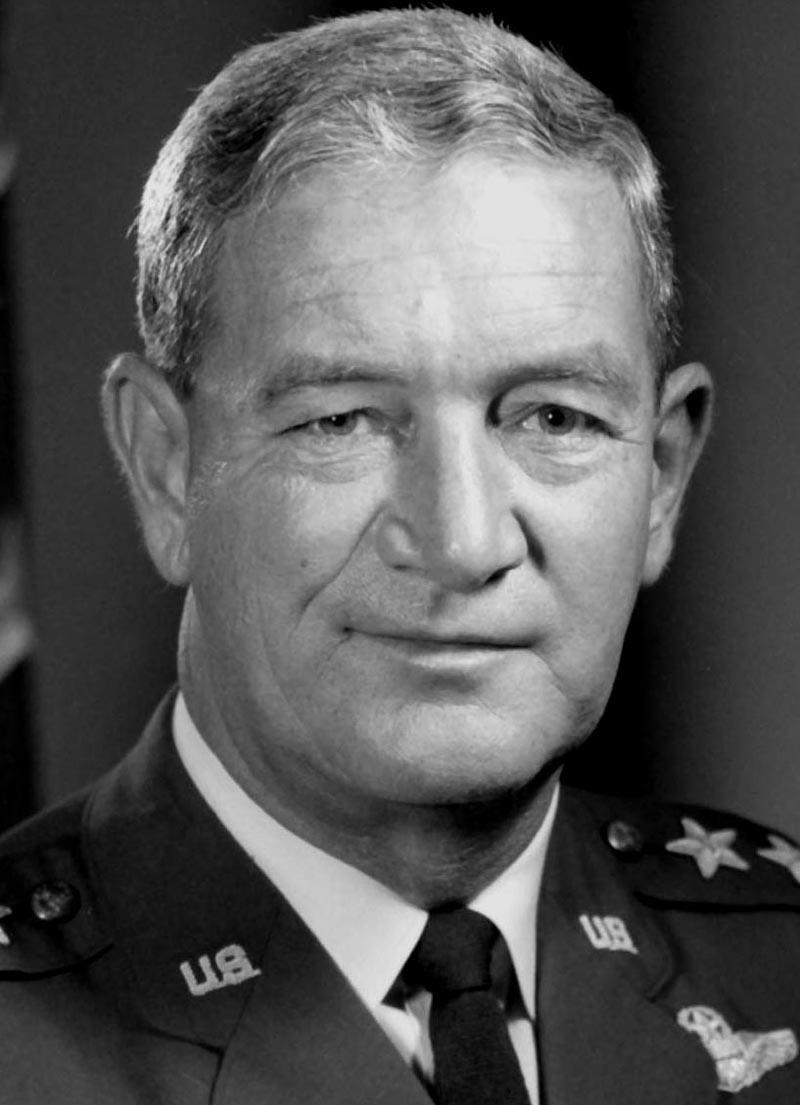
- Born: Timothy Francis O'Keefe; January 18, 1919; Brooklyn, New York City, U.S.
- Died: October 14, 1984 (aged 65); Andrews AFB, Maryland, U.S.
- Burial place: Arlington National Cemetery
- Military career
- Allegiance: United States
- Branch: United States Air Force
- Service years: 1940–1974
- Rank: General
- Commands: Primary Pilot Training School; 3545th Pilot Training Group; 6147th Tactical Control Group; Pope Air Force Base; 366th Fighter Bomber Wing; 83d Fighter-Day Wing; 4th Tactical Fighter Wing; Tactical Air Command gunnery teams; Fifth Air Force; Ninth Air Force; Vice Commander in chief, Pacific Air Forces; Deputy Commander United States Readiness Command; United States Support Activities Group/Seventh Air Force
- Conflicts: World War II; Cold War; Korean War; Vietnam War
- Awards: Air Force Distinguished Service Medal; Legion of Merit with two oak leaf clusters; Distinguished Flying Cross; Air Medal with two oak leaf clusters; Bronze Star Medal; Air Force Commendation Medal with an oak leaf cluster; Korean Ulchi with silver star

Timothy Francis O'Keefe (January 18, 1919 – October 14, 1984) was a general in the United States Air Force and the commander of various units over the years.

== Biography ==
=== Early life ===
O'Keefe was born in Brooklyn, New York, in 1919. He graduated from St. Francis Preparatory School in Brooklyn in 1936 and attended St. Francis College thereafter. In March 1940, he entered military service as an aviation cadet and in November 1940 completed flight training at Kelly Field in Texas, and was commissioned a second lieutenant in the Army Air Corps Reserve.

His next assignment was as a flight instructor at Kelly Field, Texas. On January 22, he married Eileen McSweeney. In June 1941 he was assigned as assistant aviation cadet supervisor of the Primary Flying School at Cuero, Texas, and in 1943 he became the commander. In January 1944 he attended the Command and General Staff School at Fort Leavenworth, Kansas, and upon graduation in March 1944 returned to the Primary Flying School as commander.

In September 1944, O'Keefe became operations and training staff officer for the Thirteenth Air Force in the Southwest Pacific. In January 1946, he was assigned to Headquarters Army Air Forces, Washington D.C., to serve as a member of the Operations Staff. He reported to Randolph Field, Texas, in July 1946 for duty as assistant director and then commander of the Primary Pilot Training School.

In September 1947, he entered the Air Command and Staff School, Maxwell Air Force Base, Alabama, and upon his graduation in June 1948, was assigned as air inspector at the Air Training Command, Barksdale Air Force Base, Louisiana. In July 1949, he returned to Texas, this time to Goodfellow Air Force Base, San Angelo, as commander of the 3545th Pilot Training Group.

=== Korean War ===
O'Keefe next went to Japan as deputy for operations, Far East Air Materiel Command. During the Korean War in April 1951, he went to Korea as commander of the famed "Mosquito Group," the 6147th Tactical Control Group, which under his command underwent equipment improvement and tactical advances important in the development of tactical air control used during the Vietnam War.

He returned to the United States in January 1952 and was commander of Pope Air Force Base, North Carolina, until December when he entered the Advanced Instrument Flying School at Moody Air Force Base, Georgia. Upon his graduation in March 1953, he was reassigned to Pope as inspector general for the Ninth Air Force.

From August 1953 until August 1959, General O'Keefe served with fighter units at Alexandria Air Force Base, Louisiana, where he became deputy commander of the 366th Fighter-Bomber Wing, and at Seymour Johnson Air Force Base, North Carolina, as deputy commander, 83rd Fighter-Day Wing and then commander of the 4th Tactical Fighter Wing. Between 1954 and 1958, he led the Tactical Air Command gunnery teams in the Worldwide Gunnery Meets at Nellis Air Force Base, Nevada.

In August 1959, he entered the National War College in Washington D.C., and after graduation in July 1960 was assigned to the Seventeenth Air Force in Germany as deputy chief of staff, operations. He returned to Washington in July 1963 and was assigned to Headquarters United States Air Force as deputy director of operational requirements, Office of the Deputy Chief of Staff, Programs and Requirements, and in August 1964 became Assistant for Logistics Planning, Deputy Chief of Staff, Systems and Logistics.

=== Vietnam War ===
General O'Keefe entered on his second tour of duty in Japan in August 1967 as vice commander of the Fifth Air Force and earned his third Legion of Merit while in this assignment. He had previously served with the Fifth Air Force during the Korean War. In August 1968 he returned to the United States as commander of Tactical Air Command's Ninth Air Force at Shaw Air Force Base, South Carolina.

In October 1969 he was appointed director for logistics, the Joint Staff, Organization of the Joint Chiefs of Staff, in Washington D.C. On February 11, 1971, his son Richard was killed in a plane crash while returning home from a mission in Vietnam. O'Keefe became vice commander in chief, Pacific Air Forces, in August of that year. Tim was appointed deputy commander in chief, U.S. Readiness Command with headquarters at MacDill Air Force Base, Florida, in April 1973.

He assumed command of the U.S. Support Activities Group/Seventh Air Force, with headquarters at Nakhon Phanom Royal Thai Air Force Base, Thailand, on October 8, 1973.

=== Retirement and death ===
O'Keefe retired on September 1, 1974, and died on October 14, 1984, at Malcolm Grow Medical Clinic. He was survived by his wife Eileen, who died in 2005, and three sons.O'Keefe was buried at Arlington National Cemetery, in Arlington, Virginia.

== Awards ==
His military decorations and awards include the:

- Air Force Distinguished Service Medal
- Legion of Merit with two oak leaf clusters
- Distinguished Flying Cross
- Air Medal with two oak leaf clusters
- Bronze Star Medal
- Air Force Commendation Medal with an oak leaf cluster
- Korean Ulchi with silver star
