= 6147th Tactical Control Group =

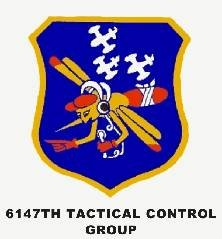
- Active: 1951–1953
- Country: United States
- Branch: United States Air Force
- Role: Forward air control

The 6147th Tactical Control Group was a United States Air Force unit that fought in the Korean War. The unit was attached to Far East Air Forces Fifth Air Force

== Background ==
Following lessons learned in WWII, the 1946 War Department Field Manual 31-35 defined the roles of a ground Forward Air Controller (FAC) and an airborne FAC, or Tactical Air Coordinator Airborne (TACA). Tactical Air Control Parties (TACP) consisted of a FAC and radio personnel, while an Air Liaison Officer (ALO) advised the ground commander. The commander of the Fifth Air Force, General Edward J. Timberlake used jeep based TACPs during the Korean War, while the Canadians used Air Contact Teams. Based on the success of Horsefly operations during World War II, Fifth Air Force Operations Officer Lt. Col. Stanley P. Latiolas suggested using slower spotter aircraft to guide the faster jets, while Col. John R. Murphy requested an operations officer and five pilots.

The combat mission of the 6147th Tactical Control Group included: 1) Provide Tactical Air Coordinators over vital areas in the vicinity of the front lines for the purpose of controlling tactical flights in attacks on targets sighted, or in close support of ground forces, 2) Provide assistance in the adjustment of ground forces artillery fire as required, 3) Provide visual reconnaissance within front line areas as required, 4) Provide Tactical Air Control parties in front line areas for the purpose of identifying suitable targets and controlling air strikes in close support of Army field forces.

== History ==
The 6147th Tactical Control Group was constituted at Taejon, South Korea, within the "operations section" of the Joint Operations Center. Three pilots and two Stinson L-5 Sentinels were assigned to provide airborne forward air controller. On 9 July 1950, Lieutenants James A. Bryant and Frank G. Mitchell flew their first mission as airborne controllers, using Ryan L-17 Navions. These were borrowed from the 24th Infantry Division after the VHF radios in the Stinsons failed to operate. Despite attacks from enemy aircraft, each pilot controlled about ten flights of Lockheed F-80 Shooting Stars. Bomb damage assessments indicated several tanks and vehicles destroyed. On 10 July, Lieutenant Harold E. Morris, controlling a flight of RAAF F-51 Mustangs, demonstrated the North American T-6 Texan trainer was a more appropriate aircraft for the FACs. On the same day, Bryant and Mitchell, also flying T-6s, directed the F-80s towards the destruction of seventeen enemy tanks near Chonui. The following day the small group of controllers left for Taegu to organize as a squadron. The 6147th Tactical Control Squadron, Airborne, activated effective 1 August to provide target spotting information to tactical aircraft in flight.

The T-6s carried smoke grenades, racks for a dozen phosphorus smoke rockets, and initially, machine guns, which were removed to prevent overzealous use. A 40-gallon belly tank gave it two more hours of endurance. C-47s provided Airborne's communications centers, called Mosquito Shirley, Mosquito Phyllis Anne, Mosquito Mellow, and Mosquito Godfrey, while Mosquito Mellow worked with the carrier-based Navy. Communication was with VHF 522 and ARC-3 radios, and a SCR-300 (31) for communicating with ground units. The rear cockpit was occupied by an observer, while the pilot flew from the front. The T-6 Airborne Controller Course was held at Luke Air Force Base from May until 15 August 1953, graduating 51.

After the UN landings at Inchon in late September, the squadron (nicknamed "Mosquitoes"), directed air strikes against retreating enemy troops ahead of the advancing UN lines and operated as the eyes of UN ground forces. Squadron controllers also conducted deep penetrations into enemy country, search and rescue, night direction for Douglas B-26 Invaders, parachute-drop mission coordination, and artillery adjustment. As the enemy fled, the squadron moved to Kimpo AB, where the pilots were within minutes of their working areas but also within range of enemy snipers on takeoffs and landings. By late October, the squadron had moved to Pyongyang but in December retreated to Taegu, where it returned to controlling close air support missions. In January 1951, the 6147th TCS gained a C-47 that provided an airborne radio relay between the Joint Operations Center and controllers, enabling Mosquitoes to adapt to the changing combat situation.

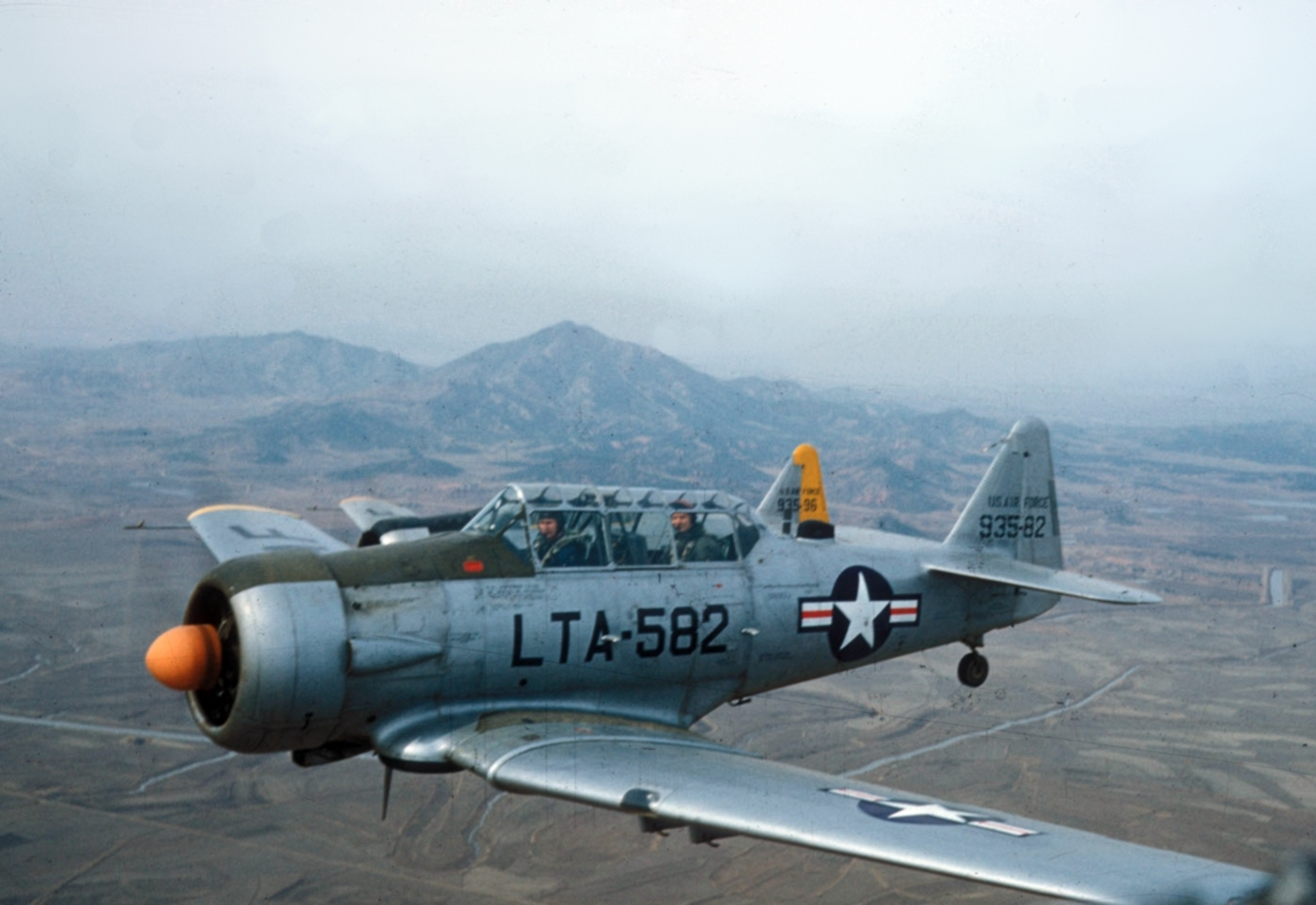
Two USAF LT-6G of the 6147th TCG over Korea, 1952.

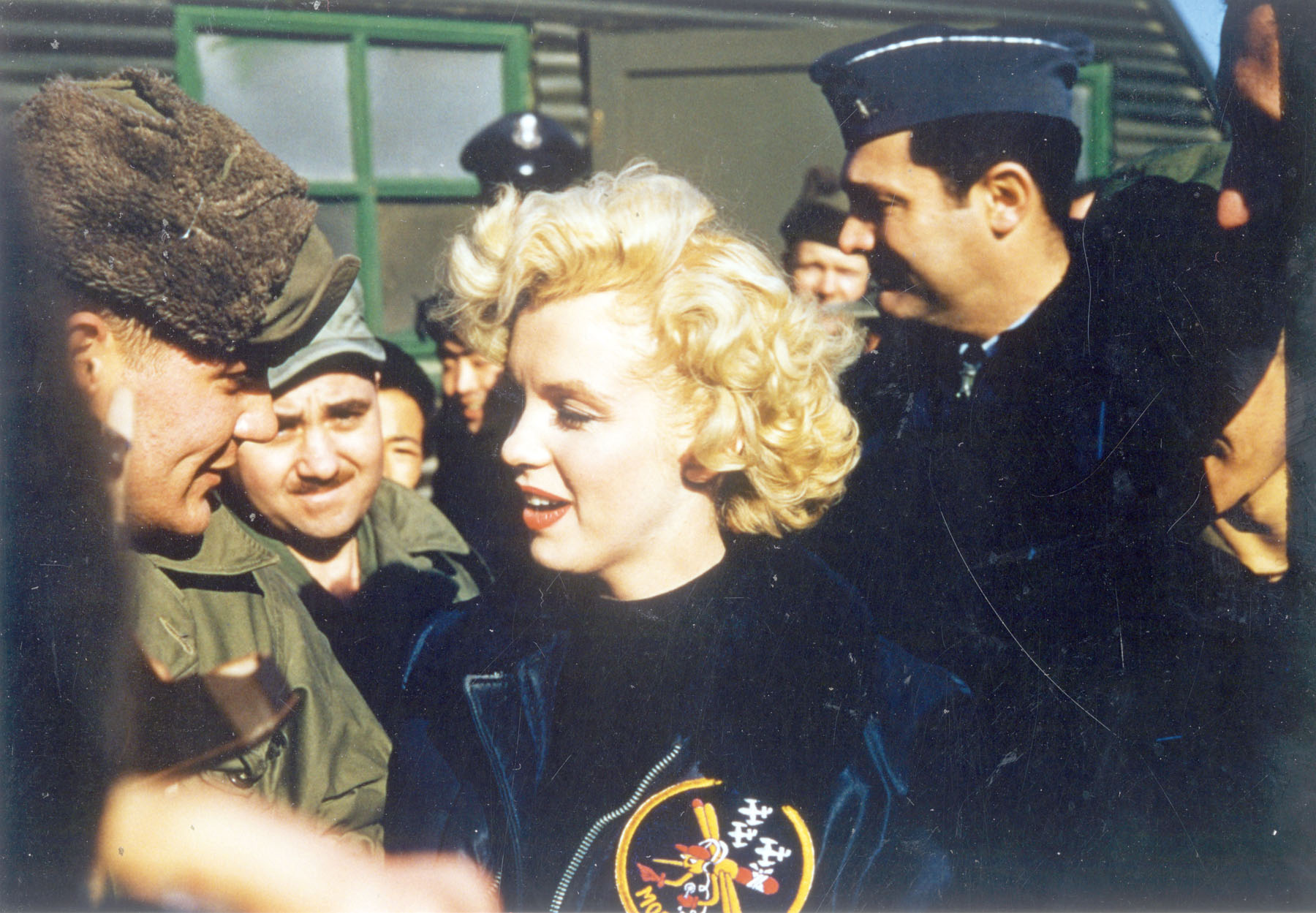
Marilyn Monroe in Korea wearing a 6147th Tactical Control Group jacket, February 1954

In April 1951, the 6147th elevated to group-level and organized three squadrons, two of which provided airborne controllers while the third provided the U.S. Army with ground tactical air control parties. A year later, the group moved to Chunchon, from where it directed interdiction missions. In the closing days of the war, it assisted allied aircraft in crushing a last-minute enemy offensive in the vicinity of the Kumsong River. The 6147th TCG earned two Presidential Unit Citations, and the Korean Presidential Unit Citation, during the war, and had flown 40,354 missions by its end. The last mission was flown on 15 June 1953, by First Lieutenant Chester L. Brown.

Combat Components

- 942nd Forward Air Control Squadron: attached 20 June 1953–.
- 6148th Tactical Control Squadron: 25 April 1951–.
- 6149th Tactical Control Squadron: 25 April 1951–.
- 6150th Tactical Control Squadron: 25 April 1951 – 20 June 1953.

Stations

- Taegu AB, South Korea, (1 August)
- Kimpo AB, South Korea (5 October 1950)
- Seoul, South Korea, (18 October 1950)
- Pyongyang East, North Korea, (28 October)
- Taegu AB, South Korea, (late November 1950)
- Pyongtaek, South Korea, (12 March 1951)
- Chunchon, South Korea, (18 April 1952)

Commanders

- Lt. Col. Merrill M. Carlton (1 August 1950)
- Col. Timothy F. O’Keefe (28 March 1951)
- Col. John C. Watson (c. January 1952)
- Col. Paul Fojtik (10 January 1953)

== Popular culture ==
- Terry reports to duty with the Mosquitoes in a 1953 edition of Terry and the Pirates (comic strip).

== See also ==
- Forward air control operations during the Korean War
- Pacific Air Forces
- Peter Worthington, Canadian journalist served with the 6417 Mosquito Squadron during the Korean War

== Additional Reading ==
- Futrell, Robert Frank (1983) The United States Air Force in Korea, 1950–1953, Maxwell AFB, Alabama Office of Air Force History, ISBN 0-912799-71-4
