= Gosagarsevara Mandapa =

The Gosagaresvara Mandapa
- Location in Orissa

Religion
- Affiliation: Hinduism
- Deity: lord Shiva

Location
- Location: Bhubaneswar
- State: Orissa
- Country: India
- Coordinates: 20°14′27″N 85°50′12″E

Architecture
- Type: Kalingan Architecture
- Elevation: 20 m (66 ft)

This mandapa is located within the Gosagaresvara siva temple precinct, Old Town, Bhubaneswar. It is a lofty platform (mandapa) provided with a flight of steps. There are sixteen pillars that support the superstructure of the flat roof. Construction of a mandapa within a precinct is a feature of Orissan temple ritual and architecture. These mandapas usually have sixteen pillars which are also noticed in the Hazari Mandapa in Kapilesvara temple precinct, Jalesvara Mandapa in the Jalesvara temple precinct of Kalarahanga, and MuktiMandapa in the Jagannatha temple precinct of Puri.

== Location ==
Lat. 20° 14’ 71’’N, Long. 85° 49’ 96’’E, Elev. 67 ft.

== Tradition & legends ==
During Durgastami, which is held in the month of September–October, Lord Lingaraja visits Gosagarsvara precinct to cleanse his sins. After the ritual bath the lord pays his homage to lord Gosagaresvara and then comes to this mandapa for public viewing where he is offered food.

== Ownership ==
Single/Multiple: multiple

Public/Private: private

== Property Type ==
Precinct/building, structure landscope site tank: precinct

Subtype: mandapa

Typology: pillared mandapa

== Property use ==
Abandoned/in use: in use

Present use: living mandapa

Past use: used

== Significance ==
Social significance: the locals and the visitors also take rest.

== Physical description ==
Surrounding: the mandapa is surrounded by Gosagaresvara temple in west, kitchen in east and Isanesvara temple in south.

Orientation: the mandapa is provided with a flight of steps in the western side.

Architectural features (plan and elevation): on plan, the mandapa is rectangular measuring 6.70 metres in length x 5.28 metres in breadth with a height of 0.80 metres from the ground level to the base of the pillars. On elevation, the mandapa has a flat roof that measures 3.40 metres in height from bottom to the top. There are sixteen pillars that support the roof of the 115 mandapa. The arrangement of the pillars is something unusual with ten pillars in the two exterior rows, five in each row and six pillars at central two rows, three in each row. While all pillars are square the two pillars in the centre are octagonal. A pedestal measuring 1.20 metres in length x 1.65 metres in width x a height of 2.05 metres; is decorated with makara Torana, and is meant for lord Shiva to seat during his visit to Gosagaresesvara. There are three flights of steps measuring 0.37 metres in length x 1.30 metres in width with a height of 0.30 metres each lead to the mandapa.

Decorative features: doorjamb

Building material: laterite

Construction techniques: ashlar masonry and cement plaster

== State of preservation ==
Good/fair/showing signs of deterioration/advanced: fair

== Grade (A/B/C) ==
Architecture: B

Historic: C

Associational: B

Social/Cultural: B

== Date of Documentation ==
22/12/2006

== Documentor ==
Dr. Sadasiba Pradhan & team
