= Combat assessment =

Combat assessment evaluates the effectiveness of military force during operations to determine whether objectives have been achieved and what additional actions may be required.

== Operational context ==
In U.S. military operations, combat assessment is the final phase in the joint targeting cycle, providing feedback to inform subsequent planning and targeting decisions.

Guidance issued by the Joint Chiefs of Staff includes the following components to inform reattack recommendations:

- Battle damage assessment: An evaluation of the physical and functional damage inflicted on a target and its related systems by lethal or nonlethal military action.
- Munitions effectiveness assessment: An analysis conducted alongside battle damage assessment that evaluates the performance of weapon systems and munitions and may inform adjustments to tactics, methods, or weapon employment.
- Collateral damage assessment: A review of unintended damage, typically outside the target boundary or to collateral concerns within it.

== Contemporary perspectives ==
Military scholarship has emphasized the growing complexity of combat assessment.

Recent research has identified challenges in translating high-level assessment concepts into consistent tactical practice and the lack of standardized frameworks for operational assessment in large-scale combat operations. International military scholarship has similarly highlighted difficulties in assessing operational effectiveness in fast-paced, multi-domain environments—particularly in air and space domains where effects may be indirect, distributed, or difficult to observe.
