= Fragplan =

Military Planning Document

A FRAGPLAN (Fragmentary Plan) or a planning fragment is a document that contains a plan for an activity or series of activities. The difference between a FRAGPLAN and a standard planning document is that rather than being a complete, holistic, end-to-end plan it is instead a pluggable, planning component which may then be assembled with other fragments to rapidly construct a complete plan. An organization may create a series of FRAGPLANs which cover different alternatives as a part of developing a planning library. People within the organization may then have readily at hand planning components when an event requiring quick response involving several parts of the organization must be responded to.

The use of FRAGPLANs are standard practice in military organizations. For instance FRAGPLANs were used as part of the execution of the US Army's VII Corps movement from Europe to the Middle East in the first Gulf War. VII Corps had FRAGPLANs for movement of VII Corp assets to various European ports for embarkation on to ships. These FRAGPLANs were used as part of the total plan to move VII Corps from its European locations to the Middle East.

The US Army describes a FRAGPLAN as planning "branches and sequels". A branch is a contingency plan or "options built into the base plan" whereas a sequel refers to "subsequent operations based on the possible outcomes of the current operation".

== See also ==
- Interchangeable parts
- Operations order
