= Operations order =

Plan to assist units in military operations

An Operation Order, often abbreviated to OPORD, is a plan format meant to assist subordinate units with the conduct of military operations. An OPORD describes the situation the unit faces, the mission of the unit, and what supporting activities the unit will conduct in order to achieve their commander's desired end state. Normally an OPORD is generated at the battalion, regimental, brigade, divisional, or corps headquarters and disseminated to its assigned or attached elements. The issuance of an OPORD triggers subordinate unit leadership to develop orders specific to the role or roles that the unit will assume within the operation. This more narrowly focused order borrows information from the original, or base, order (for example; weather, phase lines, radio frequencies, etc.) and adds additional details that pertain more to the minutiae of the actions a unit is tasked to conduct in support of the overarching operation.

Frederick Edwin Garman was the original developer and inventor of the format called "Operation Order". He developed this as a standard format for himself and his subordinates while assigned to Fort Benning's Infantry School, Ranger & Tactics Department in 1957 to 1958. The Army quickly adapted it for standardized practice and required its use during the Vietnam War. Now his version of OPORD is used by all military forces within the Department of Defense.

A standardized five paragraph order format is used by the United States Department of Defense and most other military forces. An OPORD is formatted to organize an operation into five easily understood paragraphs: Situation, Mission, Execution, Sustainment (formerly Service and Support, currently referred to as Admin & Logistics by the US Marine Corps), and Command and Control. Higher echelon's OPORDs often contain extensive details. The author of the order will often move the majority of this material to an annex or appendix. These are then issued alongside the base order. The annexes and appendices allow the OPORD to be more easily read and understood by encouraging the inclusion or removal of material after its relevancy to the order's end user is determined.

== Variations ==
The OPORD is the primary means by which a unit commander and his or her staff deliver instructions and information to subordinate units regarding the missions they are tasked to undertake or support. But it is not the only type of order that may be issued for a mission:

- A warning order (WARNO or WARNORD) informs units that an OPORD may be forthcoming. Time and circumstances permitting, a WARNORD is issued to subordinate leaders immediately after receipt of the unit's mission from higher. This is intended to provide subordinates time to develop their own warning and operations orders based on information contained within the WARNORD.

* A fragmentary order (FRAGORD) informs units that one or more elements of the base order have changed. Once an OPORD is given, the situation may change before the mission begins, or, during the operation the situation may change so that the base order must be modified. In these cases the commander will issue a FRAGORD. The FRAGORD follows the same format as the base order but only states the changes that must be made.

== Format ==
OPORD [sequential order number and fiscal year] [code name] - [issuing headquarters] (place the overall security classification and an abbreviated title at the top of the second and any following pages.)

=== 1. SITUATION. ===
a. Area of Interest.
b. Area of Operations.

(1) Terrain.
(2) Weather.

c. Enemy Forces.

(1) Composition, Disposition, and Strength.
(2) Recent Activities.
(3) Locations and Capabilities.
(4) Enemy COAs (Courses of Action).

d. Friendly Forces.

(1) Higher HQ Mission and Intent.
(2) Mission of Adjacent Units.

e. Attachments and Detachments.
f. Civilian Considerations

=== 2. MISSION. ===
A precise statement that includes the Who, What, Where, When, and Why of the operation to be conducted.

=== 3. EXECUTION. ===
a. Commander's Intent
b. Concept of operations.

(1) Maneuver.
(2) Fires.
(3) Reconnaissance and Surveillance.
(4) Intelligence.
(5) Engineer.
(6) Air Defense.
(7) Information Operations.

c. Scheme of Movement and Maneuver.
d. Scheme of Fires.
e. Casualty Evacuation.
f. Tasks to Subordinate Units
g. Tasks to Combat Support.

(1) Intelligence.
(2) Engineer.
(3) Fire Support.
(4) Air Defense.
(5) Signal.
(6) CBRNE (Chemical, Biological, Radiological, Nuclear, and Explosive weapons)
(7) Provost Marshal.
(8) MISO (Military Information Support Operations, formerly Psychological Operations or PSYOP)
(9) Civil Military.

h. Coordinating Instructions.

(1) Time or condition when the plan or order becomes effective.
(2) CCIR (Commander's Critical Information Requirements)
(3) EEFI (Essential Elements of Friendly Information)
(4) Risk Reduction Control Measures.
(5) Rules of Engagement.
(6) Environmental Considerations.
(7) Force Protection.

=== 4. Service and Support. AKA SUSTAINMENT ===
a. Logistics.

(1) Sustainment Overlay.
(2) Maintenance.
(3) Transportation.
(4) Supply.
(5) Field Services.

b. Personnel Services Support.

(1) Method of marking and handling EPWs.
(2) Religious Services.

c. Army Health System Support.

(1) Medical Command and Control.
(2) Medical Treatment.
(3) Medical Evacuation.
(4) Preventive Medicine.

=== 5. COMMAND AND SIGNAL. ===
a. Command.

(1) Location of Commander.
(2) Succession of Command.

b. Control.

(1) Command Posts.
(2) Reports.

c. Signal.

(1) SOI index in effect.
(2) Methods of communication by priority.
(3) Pyrotechnics and Signals.
(4) Code Words.
(5) Challenge and Password.
(6) Number Combination.
(7) Running Password.
(8) Recognition Signals.

== See also ==
- Five paragraph order
- FRAGPLAN
- Standard operating procedure
