= Battle of Talavera order of battle =

Peninsula War

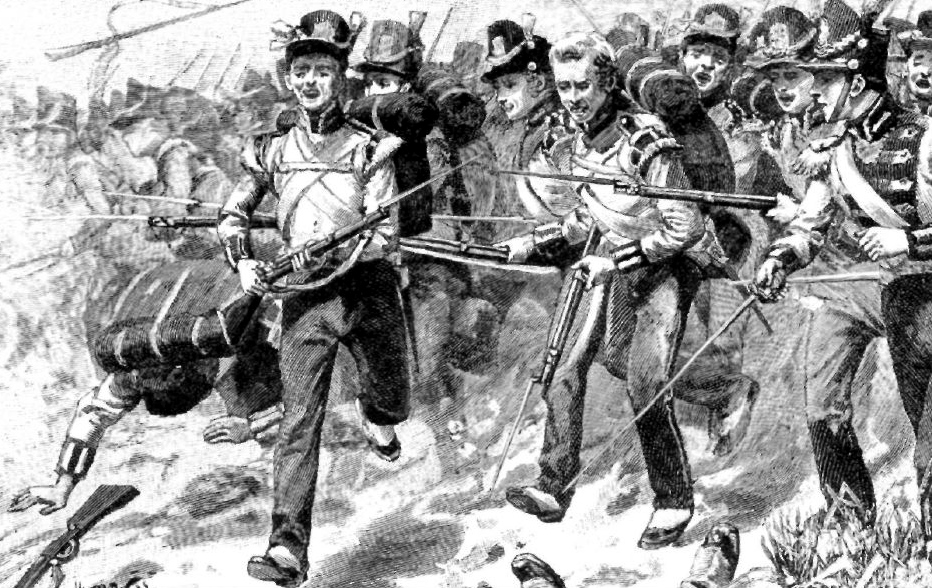
The British 48th Foot charges at the Battle of Talavera

The Battle of Talavera (27–28 July 1809) saw an Imperial French army under King Joseph Bonaparte and Marshal Jean-Baptiste Jourdan attack a combined British and Spanish army led by Sir Arthur Wellesley. After several of their assaults were bloodily repulsed on the second day, the French retreated toward Madrid leaving the battlefield to the Anglo-Spanish army. Events soon compelled Wellesley, who was soon appointed Viscount Wellington, to fall back toward his base in Portugal. The following units and commanders fought at the battle, which occurred during the Peninsular War.

== Anglo-Spanish Army ==
Commander-in-Chief of the Anglo-Spanish Army: Lieutenant General Sir Arthur Wellesley

=== British Army ===
Commander-in-Chief: Lieutenant General The Rt Hon Sir Arthur Wellesley KB

Total Anglo-Spanish forces: 52,735, 66 guns

Division	Brigade	Units	Strength	Losses 27th	Losses 28th
1st Division; Major General; John Coape Sherbrooke; 5,964	1st Brigade; Brigadier General; Henry Frederick Campbell (2,045)	1/Coldstream Guards	970	3	293
1st Division; Major General; John Coape Sherbrooke; 5,964	1st Brigade; Brigadier General; Henry Frederick Campbell (2,045)	1/3rd Foot Guards	1,019	0	322
1st Division; Major General; John Coape Sherbrooke; 5,964	1st Brigade; Brigadier General; Henry Frederick Campbell (2,045)	5/60th Rifle Regiment, one company	56	*	*
1st Division; Major General; John Coape Sherbrooke; 5,964	2nd Brigade; Brigadier General; Alan Cameron (1,364)	1/61st Foot	778	7	265
1st Division; Major General; John Coape Sherbrooke; 5,964	2nd Brigade; Brigadier General; Alan Cameron (1,364)	2/83rd Foot	535	0	283
1st Division; Major General; John Coape Sherbrooke; 5,964	2nd Brigade; Brigadier General; Alan Cameron (1,364)	5/60th Rifle Regiment, one company	51	*	*
1st Division; Major General; John Coape Sherbrooke; 5,964	3rd Brigade; Brigadier General; Ernst Eberhard Kuno, Baron Langwerth von Simmern (1,388) †	1st Line Battalion, KGL	604	9	291
1st Division; Major General; John Coape Sherbrooke; 5,964	3rd Brigade; Brigadier General; Ernst Eberhard Kuno, Baron Langwerth von Simmern (1,388) †	2nd Line Battalion, KGL	678	3	387
1st Division; Major General; John Coape Sherbrooke; 5,964	3rd Brigade; Brigadier General; Ernst Eberhard Kuno, Baron Langwerth von Simmern (1,388) †	1st Light Battalion, KGL, two companies	106	36	43
1st Division; Major General; John Coape Sherbrooke; 5,964	4th Brigade; Brigadier General; Sigismund, Baron Löw (1,167)	5th Line Battalion, KGL	610	41	255
1st Division; Major General; John Coape Sherbrooke; 5,964	4th Brigade; Brigadier General; Sigismund, Baron Löw (1,167)	7th Line Battalion, KGL	557	146	110
1st Division; Major General; John Coape Sherbrooke; 5,964	Artillery	Sillery's Company, RA (six light 6-pounders)	RA	RA	RA
2nd Division; Major General; Rowland Hill; 3,885	1st Brigade; Major General; Christopher Tilson (1,891)	1/3rd Foot	746	0	142
2nd Division; Major General; Rowland Hill; 3,885	1st Brigade; Major General; Christopher Tilson (1,891)	2/48th Foot	567	3	68
2nd Division; Major General; Rowland Hill; 3,885	1st Brigade; Major General; Christopher Tilson (1,891)	2/66th Foot	526	0	126
2nd Division; Major General; Rowland Hill; 3,885	1st Brigade; Major General; Christopher Tilson (1,891)	5/60th Rifle Regiment, one company	52	*	*
2nd Division; Major General; Rowland Hill; 3,885	2nd Brigade; Brigadier General; Richard Stewart (2,014)	29th Foot	598	55	132
2nd Division; Major General; Rowland Hill; 3,885	2nd Brigade; Brigadier General; Richard Stewart (2,014)	1/48th Foot	807	8	168
2nd Division; Major General; Rowland Hill; 3,885	2nd Brigade; Brigadier General; Richard Stewart (2,014)	1st Battalion of Detachments	609	70	203
2nd Division; Major General; Rowland Hill; 3,885	Artillery	Heise's Battery, KGA (six light 6-pounders)	KGA	KGA	KGA
3rd Division; Major General; John Randoll Mackenzie of Suddie †; 3,747	1st Brigade; Major General; Mackenzie (2,276)	2/24th Foot	787	9	343
3rd Division; Major General; John Randoll Mackenzie of Suddie †; 3,747	1st Brigade; Major General; Mackenzie (2,276)	2/31st Foot	733	119	131
3rd Division; Major General; John Randoll Mackenzie of Suddie †; 3,747	1st Brigade; Major General; Mackenzie (2,276)	1/45th Foot	756	25	158
3rd Division; Major General; John Randoll Mackenzie of Suddie †; 3,747	2nd Brigade; Colonel; Rufane Shaw Donkin (1,471)	2/87th Foot	599	198	60
3rd Division; Major General; John Randoll Mackenzie of Suddie †; 3,747	2nd Brigade; Colonel; Rufane Shaw Donkin (1,471)	1/88th Foot	599	64	85
3rd Division; Major General; John Randoll Mackenzie of Suddie †; 3,747	2nd Brigade; Colonel; Rufane Shaw Donkin (1,471)	5/60th Rifle Regiment, five companies	273	* 60th total: 27	* 60th total: 50
3rd Division; Major General; John Randoll Mackenzie of Suddie †; 3,747	Artillery	Rettberg's Battery, KGA (six heavy 6-pounders)	KGA	KGA	KGA
4th Division; Brigadier General; Alexander Campbell (WIA); 2,960	1st Brigade; Brigadier General Campbell (1,032)	2/7th Foot	431	0	65
4th Division; Brigadier General; Alexander Campbell (WIA); 2,960	1st Brigade; Brigadier General Campbell (1,032)	2/53rd Foot	537	0	39
4th Division; Brigadier General; Alexander Campbell (WIA); 2,960	1st Brigade; Brigadier General Campbell (1,032)	5/60th Rifle Regiment, one company	64	*	*
4th Division; Brigadier General; Alexander Campbell (WIA); 2,960	2nd Brigade; Colonel; James Kemmis (1,928)	1/40th Foot	745	0	58
4th Division; Brigadier General; Alexander Campbell (WIA); 2,960	2nd Brigade; Colonel; James Kemmis (1,928)	97th Foot	502	0	53
4th Division; Brigadier General; Alexander Campbell (WIA); 2,960	2nd Brigade; Colonel; James Kemmis (1,928)	2nd Battalion of Detachments	625	0	21
4th Division; Brigadier General; Alexander Campbell (WIA); 2,960	2nd Brigade; Colonel; James Kemmis (1,928)	5/60th Rifle Regiment, one company	56	*	*
4th Division; Brigadier General; Alexander Campbell (WIA); 2,960	Artillery	Lawson's Company, RA (six 3-pounders)	RA	RA	RA
Cavalry Division; Lieutenant General; William Payne-Gallwey; 2,969	1st Heavy Brigade; Brigadier General; Henry Fane (1,069 or 1,070)	3rd Dragoon Guards Regiment	525	0	3
Cavalry Division; Lieutenant General; William Payne-Gallwey; 2,969	1st Heavy Brigade; Brigadier General; Henry Fane (1,069 or 1,070)	4th Dragoon Regiment	545	0	12
Cavalry Division; Lieutenant General; William Payne-Gallwey; 2,969	2nd Brigade; Major General; Stapleton Cotton (989 or 1,189)	14th Light Dragoons	464	1	15
Cavalry Division; Lieutenant General; William Payne-Gallwey; 2,969	2nd Brigade; Major General; Stapleton Cotton (989 or 1,189)	16th Light Dragoons	525	0	14
Cavalry Division; Lieutenant General; William Payne-Gallwey; 2,969	3rd Brigade; Brigadier General; George Anson (910)	23rd Light Dragoons	459	0	207
Cavalry Division; Lieutenant General; William Payne-Gallwey; 2,969	3rd Brigade; Brigadier General; George Anson (910)	1st Hussars, KGL	451	4	37
Artillery Reserve; Brigadier General Edward Howarth (1,011)		Elliot's Company, RA (six light 6-pounders)	RA	RA	RA
Artillery Reserve; Brigadier General Edward Howarth (1,011)		British (RA) totals	RA: 681	RA: 2	RA: 32
Artillery Reserve; Brigadier General Edward Howarth (1,011)		German (KGA) totals	KGA: 330	KGA: 0	KGA: 34
Total British forces: 20,735 (16,556 infantry, 3,168 cavalry, 1,011 artillery, 30 guns)

=== Spanish Army ===
Commander-in-Chief: Lieutenant General Gregorio García de la Cuesta, Captain-General of Castilla

Spanish cavalry units ending in a number (Nr.) are regular units, and so is the Carabineros Reales Regiment. Other cavalry units are probably newly-raised volunteers. Regular units titled Cavalry are heavy cavalry, while units titled Cazadores are light cavalry. Units labeled Regiment are probably regular infantry from the old army, though Badajoz, Canarias, Mallorca, Osuna and Salamanca are not in Charles Oman's list. Units labeled Cazadores Regiment are regular light infantry. Infantry units titled Granaderos or Provincial are the standing militia units from the old army. All other infantry units are probably newly-raised volunteers.

Division	Regiments
Vanguard Division; Brigadier General José Pascual de Zayas y Chacón	2nd Voluntarios de Cataluña Regiment
Vanguard Division; Brigadier General José Pascual de Zayas y Chacón	Cazadores de Barbastro Regiment, 2nd Battalion
Vanguard Division; Brigadier General José Pascual de Zayas y Chacón	Cazadores de Campo Mayor Regiment
Vanguard Division; Brigadier General José Pascual de Zayas y Chacón	Cazadores de Valencia y Albuquerque
Vanguard Division; Brigadier General José Pascual de Zayas y Chacón	Cazadores de Valencia Regiment, 1st Battalion (Oman: 2nd)
Vanguard Division; Brigadier General José Pascual de Zayas y Chacón	Tiradores de Estremadura (Oman: excluded)
Vanguard Division; Brigadier General José Pascual de Zayas y Chacón	Lanceros de Andalusia (cavalry) (Oman: excluded)
Vanguard Division; Brigadier General José Pascual de Zayas y Chacón	Michelena's Battery (6 guns)
1st Infantry Division; Major General Antonio Zayas y Potau, Marquis de Zayas	Cantabria Regiment, three battalions
1st Infantry Division; Major General Antonio Zayas y Potau, Marquis de Zayas	Voluntarios de Castilla Regiment (Oman: excluded)
1st Infantry Division; Major General Antonio Zayas y Potau, Marquis de Zayas	Canarias Regiment, one battalion
1st Infantry Division; Major General Antonio Zayas y Potau, Marquis de Zayas	Tiradores de Mérida
1st Infantry Division; Major General Antonio Zayas y Potau, Marquis de Zayas	Provincial de Trujillo
1st Infantry Division; Major General Antonio Zayas y Potau, Marquis de Zayas	Granaderos Provinciales
1st Infantry Division; Major General Antonio Zayas y Potau, Marquis de Zayas	Tiradores de Cádiz (Oman: excluded)
1st Infantry Division; Major General Antonio Zayas y Potau, Marquis de Zayas	Artillery Battery (6 guns)
2nd Infantry Division; Major General Vicente Iglesias	Mallorca Regiment, 2nd Battalion
2nd Infantry Division; Major General Vicente Iglesias	Velez-Malaga Regiment, three battalions
2nd Infantry Division; Major General Vicente Iglesias	Osuna Regiment, two battalions
2nd Infantry Division; Major General Vicente Iglesias	Voluntarios Estranjeros
2nd Infantry Division; Major General Vicente Iglesias	2nd Provincial de Burgos (Oman: omit 2nd)
2nd Infantry Division; Major General Vicente Iglesias	Salamanca Regiment
2nd Infantry Division; Major General Vicente Iglesias	Artillery Battery (6 guns)
3rd Infantry Division; Major General Francisco Gómez de Terán y Negrete, Marquis de Portago	Badajoz Regiment, 1st and 2nd Battalions
3rd Infantry Division; Major General Francisco Gómez de Terán y Negrete, Marquis de Portago	Cazadores de Antequera (Oman: 2nd)
3rd Infantry Division; Major General Francisco Gómez de Terán y Negrete, Marquis de Portago	Imperiales de Toledo, one battalion
3rd Infantry Division; Major General Francisco Gómez de Terán y Negrete, Marquis de Portago	Provincial de Badajoz
3rd Infantry Division; Major General Francisco Gómez de Terán y Negrete, Marquis de Portago	2nd Provincial de Guadix (Oman: omit 2nd)
3rd Infantry Division; Major General Francisco Gómez de Terán y Negrete, Marquis de Portago	Artillery Battery (6 guns)
4th Infantry Division; Major General Rafael Manglano (WIA)	Irlanda Regiment, two battalions
4th Infantry Division; Major General Rafael Manglano (WIA)	Jaén Regiment, two battalions
4th Infantry Division; Major General Rafael Manglano (WIA)	Sevilla Regiment, 2nd Battalion (Oman: 3rd)
4th Infantry Division; Major General Rafael Manglano (WIA)	Leales de Fernando VII, 1st Battalion
4th Infantry Division; Major General Rafael Manglano (WIA)	2nd Voluntarios de Madrid
4th Infantry Division; Major General Rafael Manglano (WIA)	Voluntarios de la Corona Regiment
4th Infantry Division; Major General Rafael Manglano (WIA)	Artillery Battery (6 guns)
5th Infantry Division; Major General Luis Alejandro Bassecourt y Dupire	1st Real Marina Regiment, two battalions
5th Infantry Division; Major General Luis Alejandro Bassecourt y Dupire	Africa Regiment, 3rd Battalion
5th Infantry Division; Major General Luis Alejandro Bassecourt y Dupire	Murcia Regiment, two battalions
5th Infantry Division; Major General Luis Alejandro Bassecourt y Dupire	Reina Regiment, 1st Battalion
5th Infantry Division; Major General Luis Alejandro Bassecourt y Dupire	Provincial de Siguenza
5th Infantry Division; Major General Luis Alejandro Bassecourt y Dupire	Artillery Battery (6 guns)
1st Cavalry Division; Lieutenant General Juan Henestrosa	Rey Cavalry Regiment Nr. 1
1st Cavalry Division; Lieutenant General Juan Henestrosa	Calatrava Cavalry Regiment Nr. 10
1st Cavalry Division; Lieutenant General Juan Henestrosa	Imperiales de Toledo Regiment
1st Cavalry Division; Lieutenant General Juan Henestrosa	Cazadores de Sevilla Regiment
1st Cavalry Division; Lieutenant General Juan Henestrosa	Reina Cavalry Regiment Nr. 2
1st Cavalry Division; Lieutenant General Juan Henestrosa	Villaviciosa Cazadores Regiment Nr. 5
1st Cavalry Division; Lieutenant General Juan Henestrosa	Cazadores de Madrid Regiment
2nd Cavalry Division; Lieutenant General; José Miguel de la Cueva y de la Cerda, Duke of Alburquerque	Carabineros Reales Regiment, one squadron
2nd Cavalry Division; Lieutenant General; José Miguel de la Cueva y de la Cerda, Duke of Alburquerque	Infante Cavalry Regiment Nr. 4
2nd Cavalry Division; Lieutenant General; José Miguel de la Cueva y de la Cerda, Duke of Alburquerque	Pavia Cazadores Regiment Nr. 4
2nd Cavalry Division; Lieutenant General; José Miguel de la Cueva y de la Cerda, Duke of Alburquerque	Almansa Cazadores Regiment Nr. 3
2nd Cavalry Division; Lieutenant General; José Miguel de la Cueva y de la Cerda, Duke of Alburquerque	Alcantara Cavalry Regiment Nr. 7 (Oman only)
2nd Cavalry Division; Lieutenant General; José Miguel de la Cueva y de la Cerda, Duke of Alburquerque	1st Husares de Estremadura Regiment
2nd Cavalry Division; Lieutenant General; José Miguel de la Cueva y de la Cerda, Duke of Alburquerque	2nd Husares de Estremadura Regiment
2nd Cavalry Division; Lieutenant General; José Miguel de la Cueva y de la Cerda, Duke of Alburquerque	Borbón Cavalry Regiment Nr. 5 (Oman: excluded)
2nd Cavalry Division; Lieutenant General; José Miguel de la Cueva y de la Cerda, Duke of Alburquerque	Sevilla Regiment (part) (Oman: excluded)
2nd Cavalry Division; Lieutenant General; José Miguel de la Cueva y de la Cerda, Duke of Alburquerque	Madrid Regiment (part) (Oman: excluded)
Total Spanish forces: 32,000, 36 guns (Lipscombe) or 28,000 infantry, 6,000 cavalry, 800 artillery, 30 guns (Oman)

== French Army of the Centre ==
- Commander-in-Chief (nominal): Prince Joseph-Napoléon Bonaparte, King of Spain and of the Indies
- Chief-of-Staff (actual commander): Marshal of France Jean-Baptiste Jourdan, Major-General of the Armies of the King of Spain

Total French forces: 46,180, 84 guns

=== I Corps d'Armée ===
Marshal of France Claude Perrin Victor, Duke of Belluno

Division/Brigade	Strength	Units	Losses
Headquarters Staff	47	-	1
1st Division; General of Division; Count François Amable Ruffin	5,286	9th Légère Infantry Regiment	457
1st Division; General of Division; Count François Amable Ruffin	5,286	24th Ligne Infantry Regiment	567
1st Division; General of Division; Count François Amable Ruffin	5,286	96th Ligne Infantry Regiment	606
1st Division; General of Division; Count François Amable Ruffin	5,286	Foot Artillery Battery (8 guns)	*
2nd Division; General of Division; Pierre Belon Lapisse, Baron of Sainte-Hélène †	6,862	16th Légère Infantry Regiment	407
2nd Division; General of Division; Pierre Belon Lapisse, Baron of Sainte-Hélène †	6,862	8th Ligne Infantry Regiment	437
2nd Division; General of Division; Pierre Belon Lapisse, Baron of Sainte-Hélène †	6,862	45th Ligne Infantry Regiment	388
2nd Division; General of Division; Pierre Belon Lapisse, Baron of Sainte-Hélène †	6,862	54th Ligne Infantry Regiment	532
2nd Division; General of Division; Pierre Belon Lapisse, Baron of Sainte-Hélène †	6,862	Foot Artillery Battery (8 guns)	*
3rd Division; General of Division; Eugène-Casimir Villatte, Count d'Oultremont	6,135	27th Légère Infantry Regiment	189
3rd Division; General of Division; Eugène-Casimir Villatte, Count d'Oultremont	6,135	63rd Ligne Infantry Regiment	40
3rd Division; General of Division; Eugène-Casimir Villatte, Count d'Oultremont	6,135	94th Ligne Infantry Regiment	145
3rd Division; General of Division; Eugène-Casimir Villatte, Count d'Oultremont	6,135	95th Ligne Infantry Regiment	27
3rd Division; General of Division; Eugène-Casimir Villatte, Count d'Oultremont	6,135	Foot Artillery Battery (8 guns)	*
Cavalry Brigade; General of Brigade; Louis-Chrétien Carrière, Baron de Beaumont	980	2nd Hussar Regiment	16
Cavalry Brigade; General of Brigade; Louis-Chrétien Carrière, Baron de Beaumont	980	5th Chasseurs à Cheval Regiment	23
Cavalry Brigade; General of Brigade; Louis-Chrétien Carrière, Baron de Beaumont	980	Horse Artillery Battery (6 guns)	*
Reserve Artillery	Included above	Foot Artillery Battery (8 guns)	* 64 - total artillery
Reserve Artillery	Included above	Foot Artillery Battery (8 guns)	*
Total I Corps d'Armée: 19,310

=== IV Corps d'Armée ===
General of Division Horace-Francois-Bastien Sebastiani de La Porta

Division/Brigade	Strength	Losses	Units
Headquarters Staff	13	unknown	-
1st Division; General of Brigade; Louis Liger-Belair (vice Sebastiani)	8,118	2,180	28th Ligne Infantry Regiment, three battalions
1st Division; General of Brigade; Louis Liger-Belair (vice Sebastiani)	8,118	2,180	32nd Ligne Infantry Regiment, three battalions
1st Division; General of Brigade; Louis Liger-Belair (vice Sebastiani)	8,118	2,180	58th Ligne Infantry Regiment, three battalions
1st Division; General of Brigade; Louis Liger-Belair (vice Sebastiani)	8,118	2,180	75th Ligne Infantry Regiment, three battalions
1st Division; General of Brigade; Louis Liger-Belair (vice Sebastiani)	8,118	2,180	Foot Artillery Battery (8 guns)
2nd Division; General of Division; Jean-Baptiste Cyrus de Timbrune de Thiembronne, Count of Valence	1,600	40	4th Polish Infantry Regiment, two battalions
3rd Division; General of Division; Jean Francois, Baron Leval	4,537	1,007	Nassau Infantry Regiment, two battalions
3rd Division; General of Division; Jean Francois, Baron Leval	4,537	1,007	Baden Infantry Regiment, two battalions
3rd Division; General of Division; Jean Francois, Baron Leval	4,537	1,007	Hesse-Darmstadt Infantry Regiment, two battalions
3rd Division; General of Division; Jean Francois, Baron Leval	4,537	1,007	Holland Infantry Regiment, two battalions
3rd Division; General of Division; Jean Francois, Baron Leval	4,537	1,007	Frankfurt Infantry Regiment, one battalion
3rd Division; General of Division; Jean Francois, Baron Leval	4,537	1,007	Foot Artillery Battery (8 guns)
Cavalry Brigade; General of Brigade; Christophe Antoine, Count Merlin	1,188	48	10th Chasseurs à Cheval Regiment
Cavalry Brigade; General of Brigade; Christophe Antoine, Count Merlin	1,188	48	26th Chasseurs à Cheval Regiment
Cavalry Brigade; General of Brigade; Christophe Antoine, Count Merlin	1,188	48	Polish Lancer Regiment
Cavalry Brigade; General of Brigade; Christophe Antoine, Count Merlin	1,188	48	Westphalian Chevau-léger Regiment
Cavalry Brigade; General of Brigade; Christophe Antoine, Count Merlin	1,188	48	Horse Artillery Battery (6 guns)
Reserve Artillery	included above	included above	Foot Artillery Battery (8 guns)
Reserve Artillery	included above	included above	Foot Artillery Battery (8 guns)
Total IV Corps d'Armée: 15,456

=== Reserves ===
King Joseph Bonaparte

Division	Strength	Losses	Units
Madrid Garrison; General of Division; Jean-Joseph Paul Augustin, Marquis Dessolles	5,737	0	12th Légère Infantry Regiment, three battalions
Madrid Garrison; General of Division; Jean-Joseph Paul Augustin, Marquis Dessolles	5,737	0	51st Ligne Infantry Regiment, three battalions
Madrid Garrison; General of Division; Jean-Joseph Paul Augustin, Marquis Dessolles	5,737	0	King's Guard Infantry Regiment
Madrid Garrison; General of Division; Jean-Joseph Paul Augustin, Marquis Dessolles	5,737	0	27th Chasseurs à Cheval Regiment
Madrid Garrison; General of Division; Jean-Joseph Paul Augustin, Marquis Dessolles	5,737	0	King's Guard Cavalry Regiment
1st Dragoon Division; General of Division; Marie-Victor-Nicolas de Fay, Marquis de La Tour-Maubourg	3,279	83	1st Dragoon Regiment
1st Dragoon Division; General of Division; Marie-Victor-Nicolas de Fay, Marquis de La Tour-Maubourg	3,279	83	2nd Dragoon Regiment
1st Dragoon Division; General of Division; Marie-Victor-Nicolas de Fay, Marquis de La Tour-Maubourg	3,279	83	4th Dragoon Regiment
1st Dragoon Division; General of Division; Marie-Victor-Nicolas de Fay, Marquis de La Tour-Maubourg	3,279	83	9th Dragoon Regiment
1st Dragoon Division; General of Division; Marie-Victor-Nicolas de Fay, Marquis de La Tour-Maubourg	3,279	83	14th Dragoon Regiment
1st Dragoon Division; General of Division; Marie-Victor-Nicolas de Fay, Marquis de La Tour-Maubourg	3,279	83	26th Dragoon Regiment
1st Dragoon Division; General of Division; Marie-Victor-Nicolas de Fay, Marquis de La Tour-Maubourg	3,279	83	Horse Artillery Battery (6 guns)
2nd Dragoon Division; General of Division; Count Édouard Jean Baptiste Milhaud	2,356	6	5th Dragoon Regiment
2nd Dragoon Division; General of Division; Count Édouard Jean Baptiste Milhaud	2,356	6	12th Dragoon Regiment
2nd Dragoon Division; General of Division; Count Édouard Jean Baptiste Milhaud	2,356	6	16th Dragoon Regiment
2nd Dragoon Division; General of Division; Count Édouard Jean Baptiste Milhaud	2,356	6	20th Dragoon Regiment
2nd Dragoon Division; General of Division; Count Édouard Jean Baptiste Milhaud	2,356	6	21st Dragoon Regiment
2nd Dragoon Division; General of Division; Count Édouard Jean Baptiste Milhaud	2,356	6	3rd Dutch Hussar Regiment
2nd Dragoon Division; General of Division; Count Édouard Jean Baptiste Milhaud	2,356	6	Horse Artillery Battery (6 guns)
Total Reserve: 11,372
