= Forward air control operations during World War II =

Forward air control operations during World War II were begun as an ad hoc expedient to wartime conditions.

Forward air control during the war began with the Royal Australian Air Force at the Battle of Buna–Gona in November 1942, and with the British Desert Air Force in the North African Campaign the following year.

Despite prior close air support experiences beginning in World War I, the United States had no forward air control capability when World War II began. Although forward air control techniques were perfected by such US units as the 1st Air Commando Group in the China Burma India Theater, they would be ignored in the war's aftermath.

== Background ==
Attempts to coordinate air strikes with the needs of ground forces began during World War I. Forward air control techniques were further developed during the Rif War (Morocco) and the Banana Wars (Central America and Caribbean) of the 1920s and 1930s.

When the United States Army Air Forces (USAAF) was founded on 20 June 1941, it included provisions for Air Ground Control Parties to serve with the United States Army at the division, corps, and Army headquarters. The Air Ground Control Parties functions were to regulate bombing and artillery in close conjunction with the ground troops, as well as assess bomb damage. They were thus the first of similar units to try to fulfill the functions of the forward air controller (FAC) without being airborne. However, these units were often plagued by interservice rivalry and cumbersome communications between the respective armies and air forces involved. As a result, it could take hours for an air strike requested by ground troops to actually show up.

However, the advent of World War II did not lead to a functional US air control system; the 1942 edition of the American Field Manual 31-35 did not even mention a forward air controller. Forward air control during World War II came into existence as a result of exigency, and was used in several theaters of World War II. Its reincarnation in action was a result of field expedience rather than planned operations.

== Forward air control during World War II ==
=== Europe and Africa ===
==== Russian Front ====
While rebuilding the Wehrmacht during the 1930s, the German military valued coordination between strike aircraft and ground troops. When they launched their attack on Poland in September 1939, Stuka fighter-bomber pilots accompanying the blitzkrieg effectively directed air strikes via radio.

During Operation Barbarossa, in late 1941, Generaloberst Wolfram von Richthofen circled over retreating Russian troops in a Fieseler Storch and called in Stukas and other German ground attack aircraft on them.

==== North Africa ====
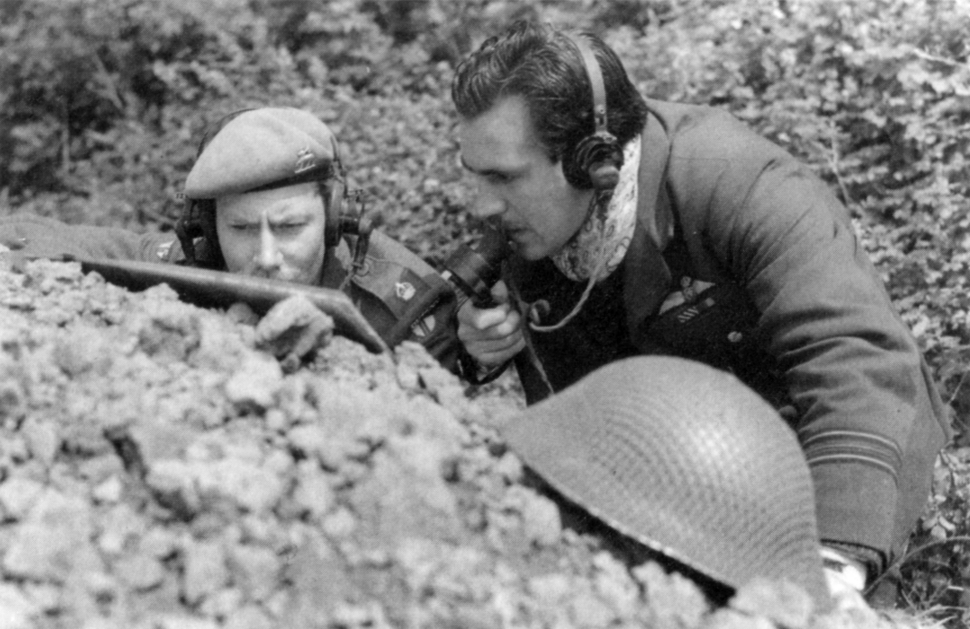
British Mobile Fighter Controllers operating during World War II

Forward air controllers were first used by the British Desert Air Force in North Africa, but not by the USAAF until operations in Salerno. During the North African Campaign in 1941 the British Army and the Royal Air Force established Forward Air Support Links (FASL), a mobile air support system using ground vehicles. Light reconnaissance aircraft would observe enemy activity and report it by radio to the FASL which was attached at brigade level. The FASL was in communication (a two-way radio link known as a "tentacle") with the Air Support Control (ASC) Headquarters attached to the corps or armoured division which could summon support through a Rear Air Support Link with the airfields. They also introduced the system of ground direction of air strikes by what was originally termed a "Mobile Fighter Controller" traveling with the forward troops. The controller rode in the "leading tank or armoured car" and directed a "cab rank" of aircraft above the battlefield.

In March 1943, a British air controller was essential at the Battle of the Mareth Line; he directed 412 strike sorties, forcing German troops to retreat from their defensive positions with heavy casualties.

==== Italian campaign ====
By the time the Italian campaign had reached Rome, the Allies had established air superiority. They were then able to pre-schedule strikes by fighter-bomber squadrons; however, by the time the aircraft arrived in the strike area, ofttimes the targets, which were usually trucks, had fled. The initial solution to fleeting targets was the British "Rover" system. These were pairings of air controllers and army liaison officers at the front; they were able to switch communications seamlessly from one brigade to another—hence Rover. Incoming strike aircraft arrived with pre-briefed targets, which they would strike 20 minutes after arriving on station only if the Rovers had not directed them to another more pressing target. Rovers might call on artillery to mark targets with smoke shells, or they might direct the fighters to map grid coordinates, or they might resort to a description of prominent terrain features as guidance. However, one drawback for the Rovers was the constant rotation of pilots, who were there for fortnightly stints, leading to a lack of institutional memory. US commanders, impressed by British at the Salerno landings, adapted their own doctrine to include many features of the British system.

Call signs for the Rovers were "Rover Paddy" and "Rover David" for the RAF; the names were those of the fighter pilots who originated the idea. The American version was "Rover Joe". Rover Joe was not an individual, but an ad hoc unit consisting of a pilot as forward air controller, a ground forward air controller, and fifteen enlisted men, including communications specialists and other ranks. The unit could move right along with the ground forces it supported.

It soon became apparent that air strikes could be used even beyond the range of marking artillery, and that better target marking methods were needed. This led to the Horsefly FACs. There are two accounts of the origin of the Horsefly FACs; both may be true, as they are not contradictory.

- One version tells of an anonymous L-5 Sentinel pilot who mentioned the FAC concept to Tactical Air Controller Captain William Davidson. Davidson then bucked it up the line to his seniors in Tactical Air Command.
- The other version says Colonel Earl Reichert asked his commander to borrow a couple of liaison aircraft from General Mark Clark.

Regardless of inspiration, the first Horsefly FACs were launched on 28 June 1944. The scrounged L-5s had been equipped with SCR-522 VHF radios, and were flown by volunteer fighter-bomber pilots. Fighter-bomber squadrons were instructed that FAC missions had priority in targeting. The Horseflies operated at an altitude of 3,000 to 4,000 feet, ranging above small arms fire, roving up to 20 miles inside German lines, and marking targets with smoke bombs. To aid the strike pilots in seeing the tiny liaison craft, the upper wing surfaces were painted with one of four bright colors. Call signs were keyed to these colors: Horsefly Red, Green, Yellow, or Blue. When the German ground troops realized that the silvery-bottomed Horseflies were deadly, they concentrated fire on them. The counter to that was to paint the Horseflies the same khaki as ordinary artillery spotters. The Germans then became leery of firing on any of the khaki observation aircraft.

The Horseflies were obviously susceptible to enemy air attack and ground fire; they also added radio traffic to an already overburdened network. However, their effectiveness outweighed their disadvantages. The Horseflies became an integral part of XII Tactical Air Command, and moved with them from Italy to southern France to southern Germany. The Horseflies saw action until the end of the European war. Horsefly losses amounted to one L-5 wiping out its landing gear in a landing accident.

==== Normandy landings ====
With the June 1944 Allied landings in Normandy, fighter-bombers began a new direct support role, operating with the assistance of radio-equipped FACs on the ground with the supported formations. Allied tanks were emblazoned with a new white star on their turret tops. Cerise and yellow signal panels were provided to the 3rd Army troops. At least 10 tanks in every armored division were fitted with VHF sets to contact aircraft overhead. Fighter bombers were on call from "Cab Ranks", orbiting points close to the forward edge of the battle area. Although already briefed for a target, the fighter-bombers would first await a call to strike an immediately pressing target. From these Cab Ranks, the FACs could very quickly call on air support for any targets of opportunity or threats to the troops in their area, with uncalled upon aircraft striking their briefed target. These ground FACs operated from White Scout Cars or M3 half tracks (and later tanks) equipped with a wide range of radio sets for both ground to air and ground to ground communications. Airborne FACs were supplied from the air observation post squadrons (pilots and observers generally came from the Army) of the RAF operating Auster IV.

=== The Pacific Theater and Southern Asia ===
==== South Pacific ====
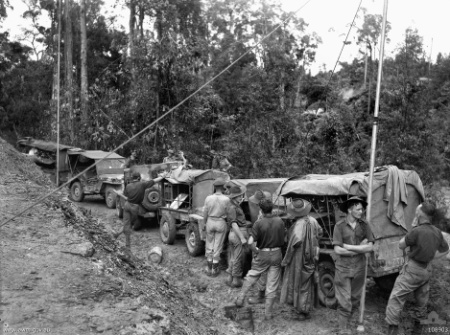
A RAAF ground control party during the Battle of Tarakan in 1945

In November 1942, units of the Australian and United States Armies were fighting the Japanese in the Battle of Buna-Gona, New Guinea. Number 4 Squadron of the Royal Australian Air Force was an army cooperation squadron flying support for the ground effort, in outdated two-seater CAC Wirraway trainers. They sometimes used the second seat to carry an observer. The local terrain was jungled; ground troops had difficulty in observing the enemy or in staying linked with one another. Therefore, the Wirraway pilots, with their superior observation, began directing artillery fire onto the Japanese from the air via radio, as well as carrying out their own strafing and bombing. One pilot, Pilot Officer J. Archer, even shot down a Japanese Zero, for the only known aerial victory by an Australian FAC.

In early 1943 the Japanese launched an offensive against Wau. On 3 February 1943, a 4 Squadron Wirraway recced (performed Reconnaissance mission) Japanese dispositions at 1:20 PM. It left, to return at 2:39 leading the Bristol Beaufighters of 30 Squadron RAAF into the target area. The Wirraway marked the target with tracer fire, and the Beaufighters struck. A Japanese prisoner captured shortly thereafter reported that out of the 60 troops in his vicinity, 40 had been killed by the air strike. Later, in December 1944, 4 Squadron directed the US 7th Fighter Squadron as they supported an Australian army attack in the Battle of Shaggy Ridge.

The other cooperation squadron in the theater, 5 Squadron, also took up the forward air control role. Both squadrons were re-equipped with the CAC Boomerang, which was an Australian fighter-bomber containing many Wirraway components. The Boomerangs had performance comparable to enemy fighters, and became the original fast FACs. Dissatisfaction with the poor target marking possible with tracer bullets led to 5 Squadron's use of 30 pound phosphorus bombs on Bougainville in 1944. During the Bougainville campaign, FACs from 5 Squadron directed as many as 20 Corsairs at a time in air strikes. With practice, ordnance came to be delivered as close as 150 yards from friendly troops.

==== Aleutian Islands Campaign ====
American aerial attackers in the Aleutian Islands had to contend with fog and low-lying cloud cover, as well as heavy Japanese defensive ground fire. The situation led to the use of forward air control. On 16 May 1943, General Eugene M. Landrum ordered his air chief of staff, Colonel William O. Eareckson to coordinate air strikes with ground operations for the invasion of Attu. Eareckson borrowed an OS2U Kingfisher from the USS Casco (AVP-12). Using the seaplane's low speed and maneuverability to his advantage, Eareckson flew reconnaissance missions to spot Japanese positions. He would then spiral up through the clouds to rendezvous with strike aircraft and either lead the strike into the targets or describe the target location to the fighter-bombers. Ground fire not only hit the Kingfisher; it sometimes punctured the plane's single float. Eareckson would land in shallow water, beach the plane, and plug the bullet holes with rubber plugs before resuming his mission.

==== Burma ====
Pathfinders in the European Theater flew advance missions to mark targets for strategic bombing raids; however, they were not providing close air support to troops. The Pathfinders in the Pacific campaign operated slightly differently than their European pathfinder counterparts and pioneered a number of military "firsts". such as medevacing wounded by air and the use of helicopters in warfare.

The Pacific Pathfinder mission began at the Quebec Conference in August 1943. President Franklin D. Roosevelt was impressed by British General Orde Wingate's account of what could be accomplished in Burma with proper air support. To comply with Roosevelt's proposed air support for British long range penetration operations in Burma, the United States Army Air Forces created the 5318th Air Unit to support the Chindits. In March 1944, they were designated the 1st Air Commando Group by USAF General Hap Arnold. Arnold chose Colonel John R. Alison and Colonel Philip Cochran as to command the Air Commando Group. When Wingate's Chindits launched Operation Thursday, each of its columns had a forward air controller to direct support from Mitchell and Mustang aircraft.

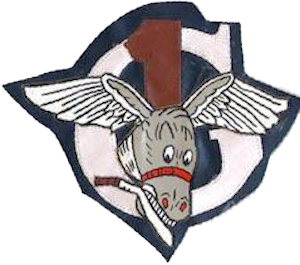
Emblem of the USAAF 1st Air Commando Group

In an imaginative move prompted by Colonel Cochran's assurance that he could transport both troops and supplies by glider, In three months, 600 sorties by Dakota transport aircraft transferred 9,000 troops, 1,300 pack animals and 245 tons of supplies to landing zones across Burma. When the Burma road was reopened in January 1945 the Air Commandos were inactivated in preparation for the invasion of mainland Japan.

== Postwar forward air control ==
The U.S. military codified their forward air control (FAC) experience from World War II in 1946, when the most recent edition of Field Manual 31–35 Air Ground Operations (FM 31–35) was issued for the U.S. Army. The Army Air Force organized its strategic bombers into the Strategic Air Command (SAC), and split its fighters into Air Defense Command (ADC), and Tactical Air Command (TAC). The latter was tasked with close air support (CAS), and thus with forward air control. The Air Force's doctrine, based on Second World War experience called for three necessary conditions for successful close air support. One was gaining air superiority over the enemy. Another was isolating the battlefield via interdiction strikes on a foe's lines of communication. The third was the delivery of air strikes via a forward air control system supporting the Army's ground forces. The Army tended to believe the latter was given the lowest priority by the Air Force and resented it. In 1947, the newly established U.S. Air Force also adopted FM 31–35. However, this failed to set a single forward air control system within the U.S. military. As part of the division of forces when the Air Force became independent, the U.S. Navy and U.S. Marine Corps kept their aviation components and their forward control systems. The Army kept its light liaison aircraft and the few helicopters of the era, but was still dependent on the Air Force for most air support, including forward air control.
