= Battle damage assessment =

Assessment of battle damage

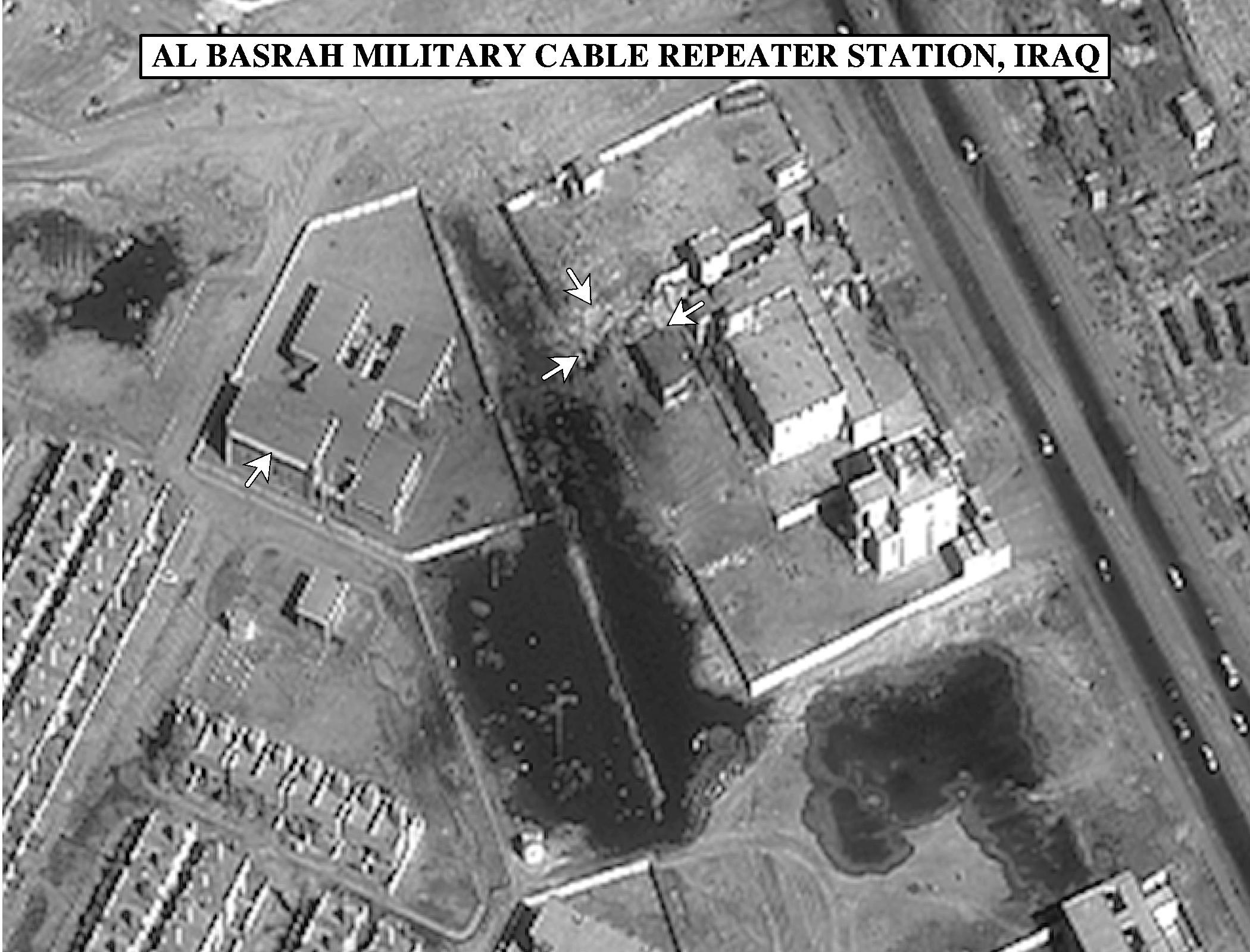
1998 BDA photograph of a military cable station in Basra, Iraq

Battle damage assessment (BDA), sometimes referred to as bomb damage assessment, is the process of evaluating the physical and functional damage inflicted on a target as a result of military operations. It is a core component of combat assessment and is used to inform judgments about mission effectiveness and potential follow-on actions, including reattack recommendations.

== History ==
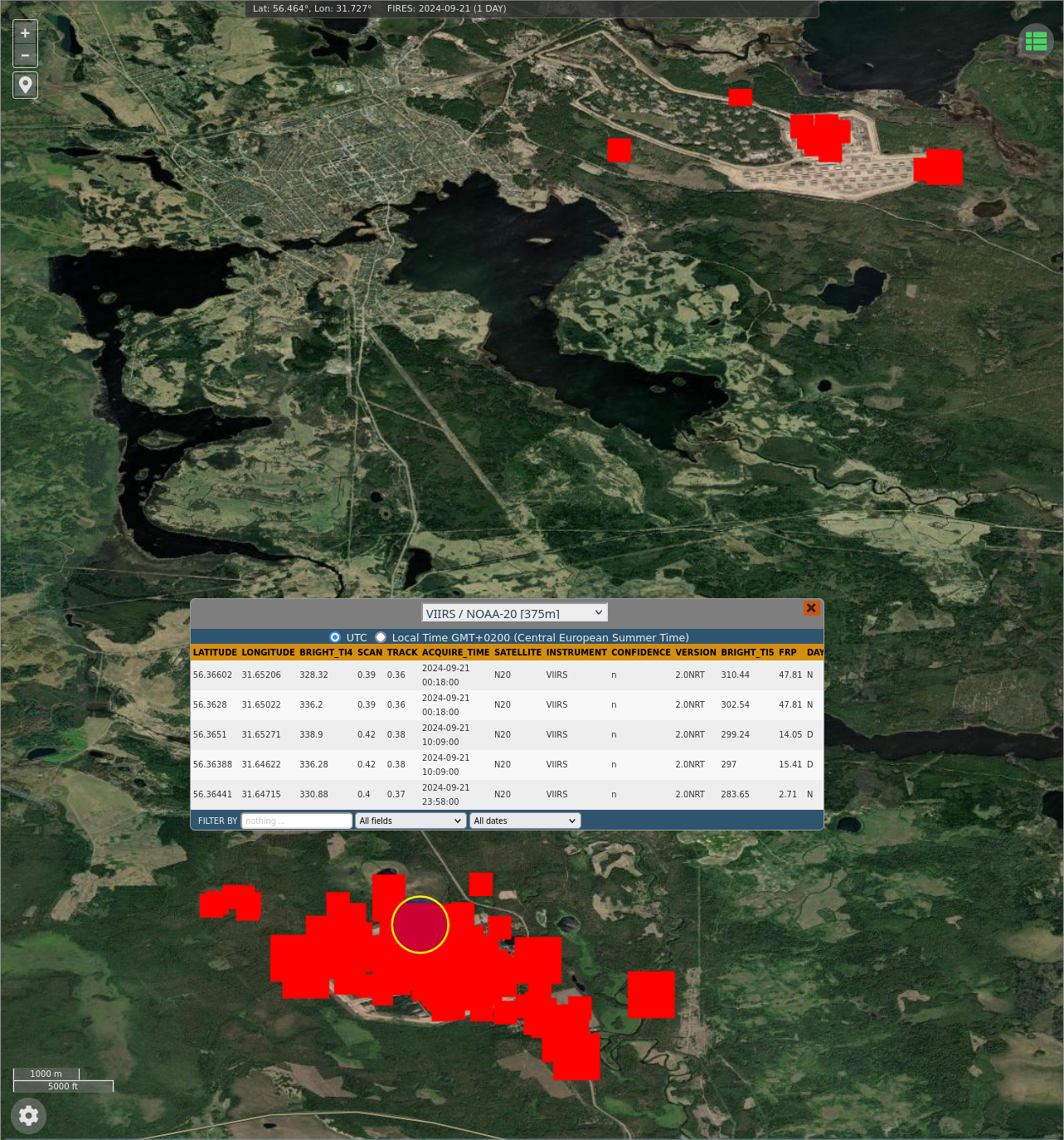
OSINT can use NASA's FIRMS for BDA of e.g. the 2024 Toropets depot explosions

During World War I, the expansion of aerial bombardment made it difficult to determine the effects of attacks on distant targets, leading to the development of early battle damage assessment practices. Initial methods included debriefing aircrews and limited photo review, but by World War II, photographic reconnaissance had become widely used to evaluate the results of air operations.

In some cases, BDA has come from information inadvertently released by the enemy. In World War II, United Press International transmitted a report on the damage caused by the Japanese attack on Pearl Harbor, including details on the number of damaged warships and shore installations.

During the Vietnam War, U.S. ground forces and reconnaissance elements conducted on-the-ground assessments in operational areas where U.S. forces were present to evaluate the effects of air operations.

BDA was used during both the Gulf War and Iraq War. In the opening days of the air campaign of the Gulf War, it was used to assess the damage to key Iraqi installations including its nuclear reactors. At the conclusion of the 2003 invasion of Iraq, a joint team from the allied nations (including Britain, the United States and Australia) assessed the damage caused to almost 400 sites across the country to determine the effectiveness of weapon strikes.

In recent conflicts, unmanned aerial vehicles (UAVs) have been used to support post-strike battle damage assessment through persistent overhead surveillance and real-time imagery from electro-optical and infrared sensors. Special operations forces (SOF) have taken part in BDA, both through physical presence, and conducting overflights with equipment such as the RQ-4 Global Hawk UAV. The Israel Defense Forces includes two teams dedicated to both target designation and BDA.

As the field has advanced and the quantity of available data has increased, statistical techniques have been introduced to improve the speed and quality of data analysis.

The advent of publicly available satellite imagery such as NASA's FIRMS has allowed also for open-source intelligence to do BDA.

== Objectives ==
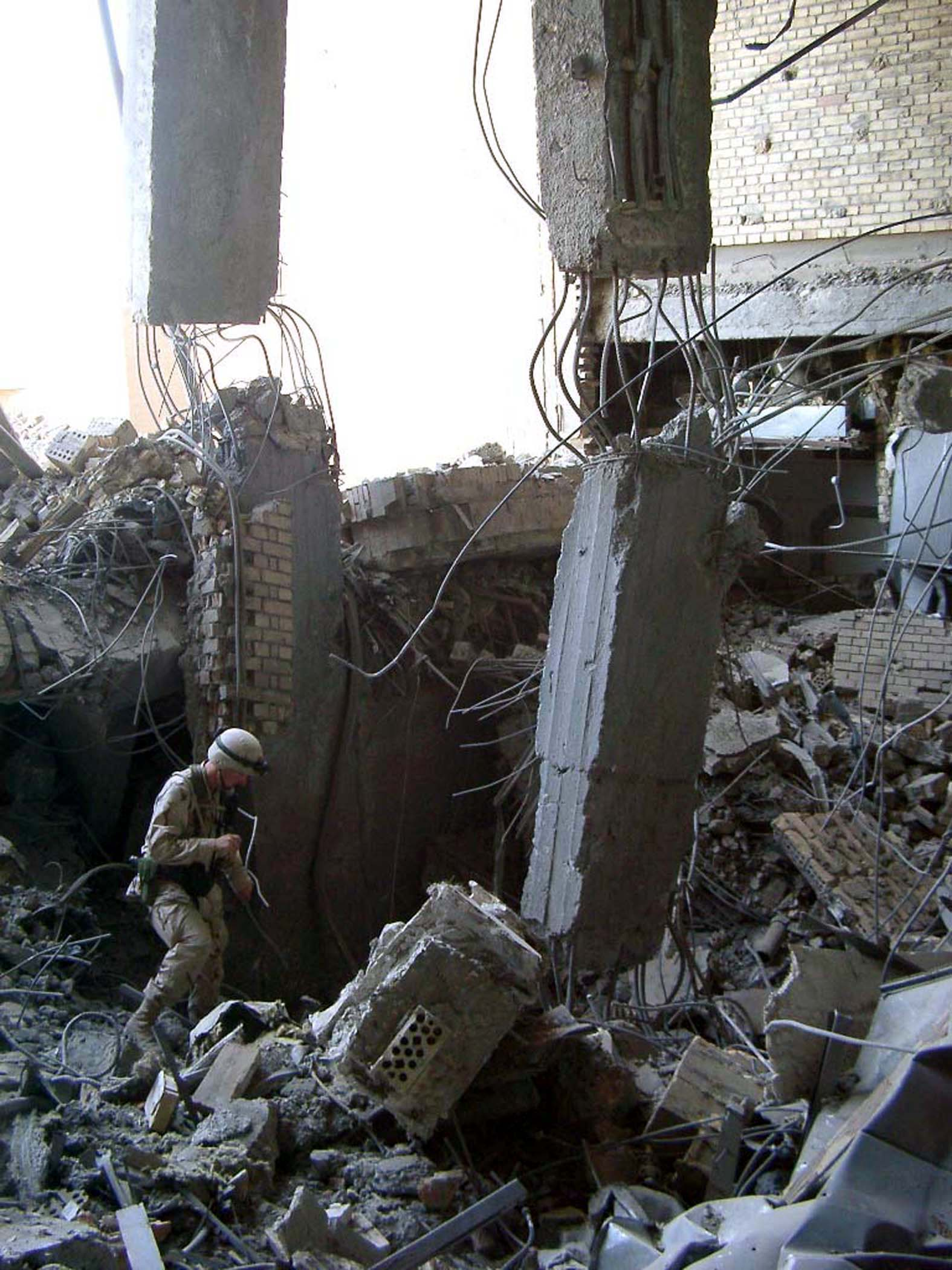
US Navy officer from the Combined Weapons Effectiveness Assessment Team (CWEAT) examines the effectiveness of a Joint Direct Attack Munition (JDAM) at one of Saddam Hussein’s presidential palaces.

The goal of this assessment is to evaluate the effects of military force on designated targets in order to determine whether operational objectives were achieved and to support subsequent decision-making.

According to doctrinal guidance from the Joint Chiefs of Staff, the BDA methodology seeks to answer the following questions:

- Did the weapon or capability deliver the desired effect on the target?
- What was the extent of the effect at the target element, target, and target system level?
- Was there additional or collateral damage that should be reported?
- Were the commander’s targeting objectives met?
- What are the intelligence inputs for MEA (munitions effectiveness assessment)?
- What are the intelligence inputs for RR (reattack recommendations) or future targeting recommendations?

== Assessment process ==
U.S. joint guidance describes battle damage assessment as a structured analytical process that evaluates physical, functional, and system-level effects and informs follow-on targeting decisions. The process relies on intelligence and operational reporting, including information derived from intelligence, surveillance, and reconnaissance (ISR) activities, and is refined as additional information becomes available.

Assessment is performed using many techniques including footage from in-weapon cameras, gun cameras, forces on the ground near the target, satellite imagery and follow-up visits to the target. For nuclear weapons, special techniques may be required due to the extensive damage caused and difficulty in approaching the site.

== Limitations ==
BDA relies on humans to interpret and analyze the data collected from various sources. Despite improvements in the data capture techniques, limitations in the assessment process were exposed following the 1991 Gulf War when the data supplied by on-board cameras was not analyzed correctly. This flawed analysis resulted in incorrect or incomplete information being given to local commanders on the extent of the damage caused. In particular the analysis did not reliably identify whether a target had been damaged (but remained militarily viable) or was no longer a threat.

== Use of misinformation ==
Information on battle damage is highly valuable to the enemy and military intelligence and censors will endeavor to conceal, exaggerate or underplay the extent of damage depending on the circumstances. Following the Bluff Cove Air Attacks during the Falklands War, the British military misled the media into exaggerating the real casualty numbers from less than 50 killed to a range of 400–900 killed and wounded. This misinformation is believed to have contributed to the weak resistance faced by the British during the subsequent assault on Port Stanley.
