= Battle of Arzobispo =

1809 battle of the Peninsular War

- Part of Peninsular War
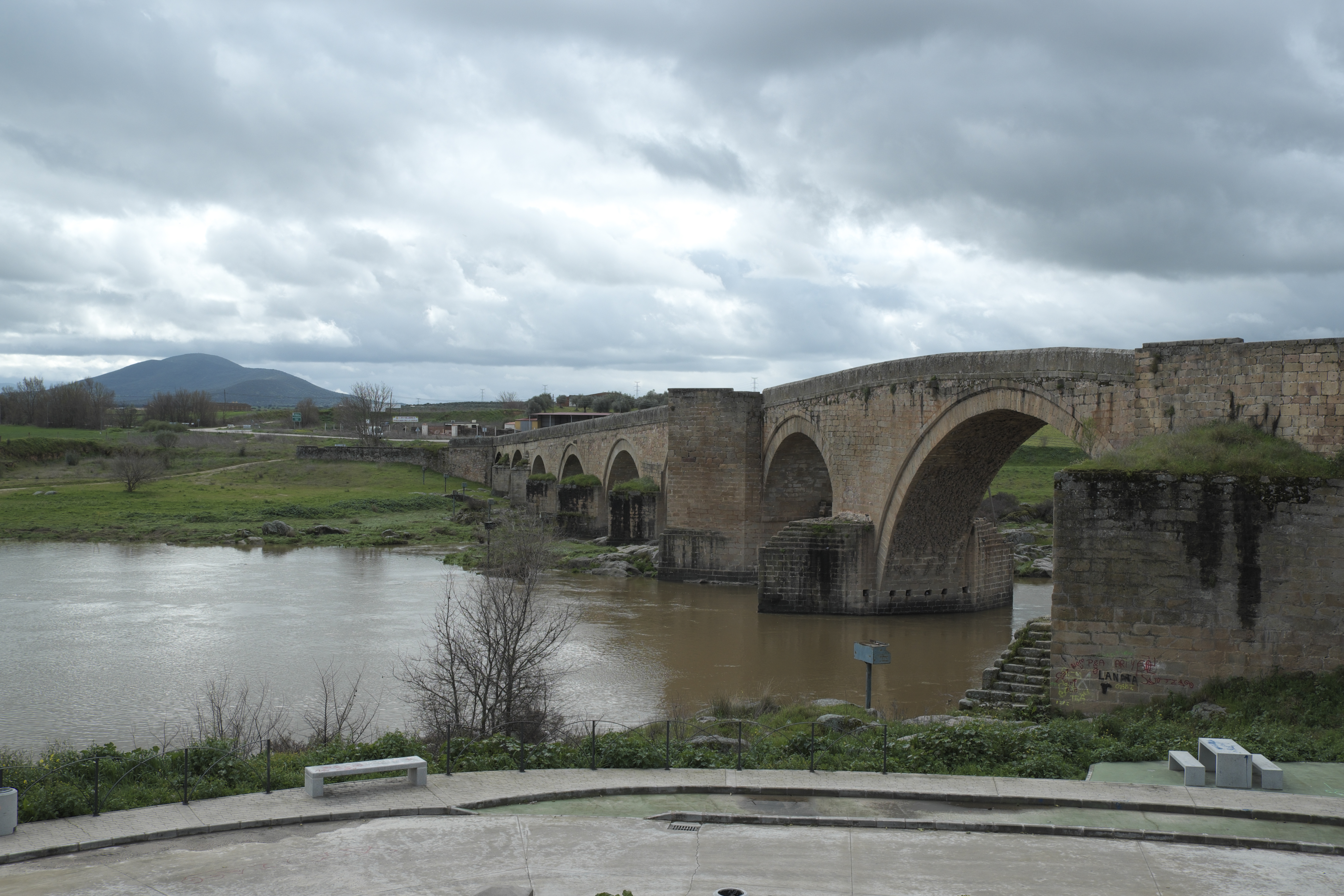
- The knoll where the Spanish guns were emplaced can be seen just beyond the south end of the Arzobispo bridge.
Date	8 August 1809
Location	El Puente del Arzobispo, Spain 39°48′00″N 5°10′00″W
Result	French victory

Belligerents
(First French Empire) French Empire	Kingdom of Spain

Commanders and leaders
(First French Empire) Jean-de-Dieu Soult	(Spain) Duke of Alburquerque

Units involved
II Corps and V Corps	Army of Extremadura

Strength
10,000	8,000

Casualties and losses
400	1,600; 30 guns

Peninsular War: Castile & Andalusia
current battle

The Battle of Arzobispo on 8 August 1809 saw two Imperial French corps commanded by Marshal Jean-de-Dieu Soult launch an assault crossing of the Tagus River against a Spanish force under José María de la Cueva, 14th Duke of Alburquerque. Alburquerque's troops rapidly retreated after suffering disproportionate losses, including 30 artillery pieces. El Puente del Arzobispo (The Archbishop's Bridge) is located 36 kilometres (22 mi) southwest of Talavera de la Reina, Spain. The action occurred during the Peninsular War, part of a larger conflict known as the Napoleonic Wars.

The Battle of Talavera in late July 1809 saw a victory by Arthur Wellesley's British army and Gregorio García de la Cuesta's Spanish army over the Imperial French army of King Joseph Bonaparte. Wellesley (soon to be known as Wellington) found that he was unable to exploit the triumph due to the failure of his logistical arrangements. Within a few days, Wellesley discovered that Soult's large French army was attempting to cut off his army from Portugal.

Accordingly, the British and Spanish armies withdrew to the west, narrowly avoiding interception by Soult's forces. Alburquerque was left with 3,000 cavalry and 5,000 infantry to hold the bridge of Arzobispo. Because their position was so strong, the Spanish were lulled into a false sense of security. Meanwhile, French officers found and secretly reconnoitered a hidden ford near the bridge. Achieving tactical surprise, the French cavalry plunged across the ford during the Spanish siesta, followed by the infantry of Marshal Édouard Mortier's V Corps. Before Alburquerque could react, his cavalry was routed and one of his infantry battalions crushed. During the pursuit, Soult's horsemen not only seized 16 Spanish guns, but also recaptured at least 14 of the 17 French artillery pieces lost at Talavera.

== Background ==
=== French offensive ===
Though the Anglo-Spanish armies triumphed over King Joseph Bonaparte's army at the Battle of Talavera on 27 and 28 July 1809, the butcher's bill was steep. The British counted 5,365 casualties, including 3,915 wounded while Gregorio García de la Cuesta's Spanish army lost only 400 to 500 men killed and wounded. The battle's losers suffered more; a total of 7,268 Frenchmen were casualties. On the morning of 29 July, General Robert Craufurd's Light Infantry Brigade and a battery of Royal Horse Artillery arrived in the British camp after an epic forced march. Even so, General Wellesley's army was in no shape to exploit its victory. The soldiers were on one-third rations due to the collapse of the supply system and the medical officers were unable to care for the thousands of wounded men. With few wagons and carts, Wellesley was unable to bring supplies forward from his base at Plasencia or evacuate his wounded. The British commander received intelligence that a French force was moving down from the north, but he assumed that there were only about 15,000 French troops. As it happened, the threat was much worse than Wellesley imagined.

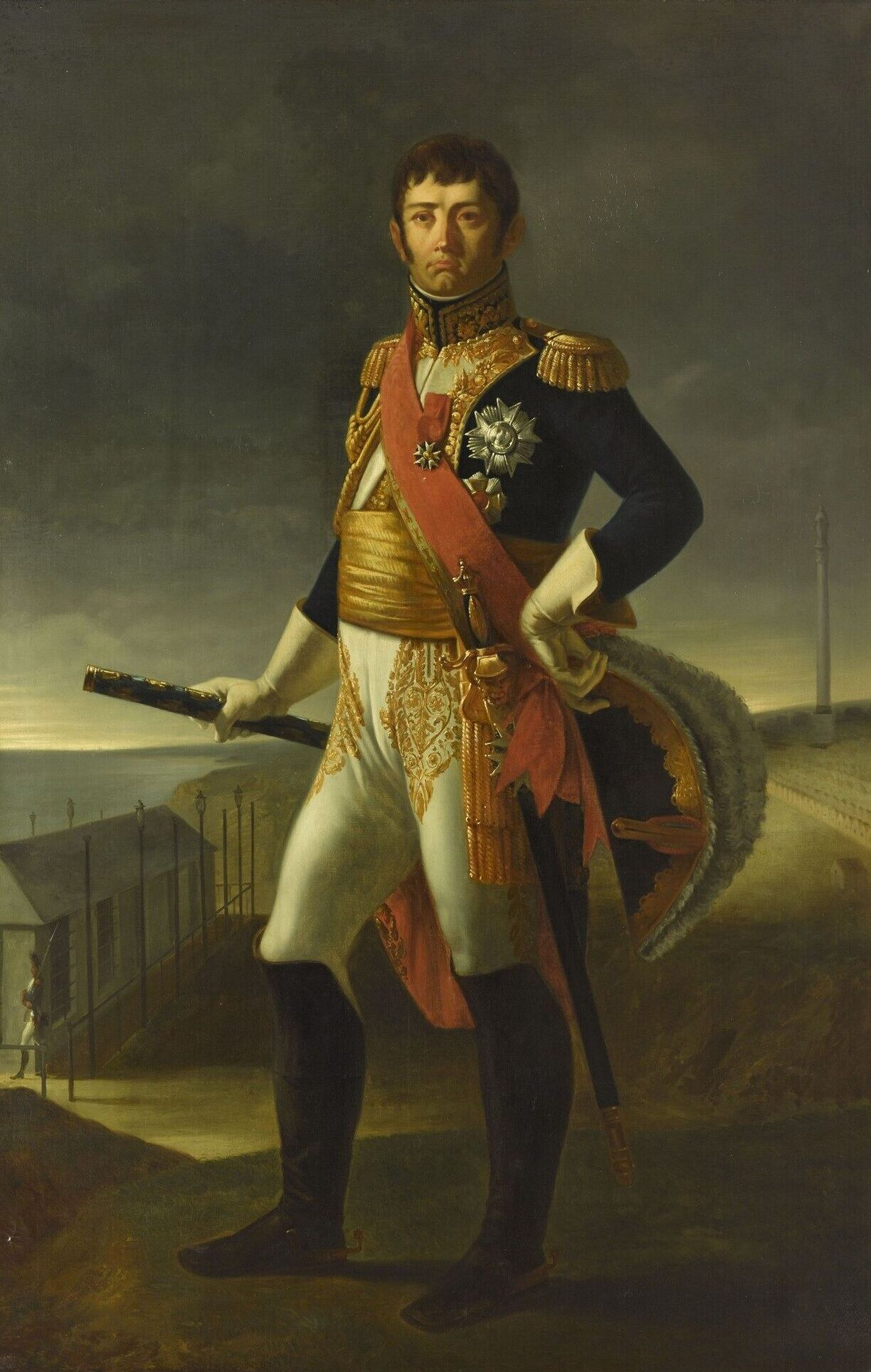
Marshal Jean-de-Dieu Soult

On 12 June 1809, Emperor Napoleon ordered Marshal Soult to take command of the II Corps, V Corps, and VI Corps and move against the British army. It took some time to assemble this host but on 27 July, Marshal Mortier's 16,916-man V Corps and 1,853 dragoons set out from Salamanca toward the south. On the 29th, Soult's own II Corps received a convoy of artillery to replace the guns lost in the 1809 Portugal Campaign. Thus equipped, the 18,740-strong II Corps marched south on the 30th. Marshal Michel Ney and the 12,500-man VI Corps followed on 31 July, after dropping off a brigade of 3,200 men. Napoleon insisted that Soult keep his corps closed up to avoid defeat in detail. At most, about 10,000 French Imperial soldiers under General of Division François Étienne de Kellermann were left behind to defend León. Soult was aware that the Spanish and Portuguese could bring 20,000 men against Kellermann. But he accepted the risk because he understood that Wellesley's British army was the main objective.

The Allied strategy had called for General Francisco Javier Venegas and the Spanish Army of La Mancha to prevent the French IV Corps under General of Division Horace François Bastien Sébastiani from reinforcing Joseph's army at Talavera. In this, Venegas was completely unsuccessful, but another opportunity opened up. With Sébastiani gone from his front, the way to Madrid was almost undefended. Though his own army was too crippled to move at the moment, Wellesley hoped that pressure from Venegas' offensive would compel the French to retreat. The Army of La Mancha pressed forward to Toledo and Aranjuez on 29 July, but then it unaccountably halted in place until 5 August. Dropping off Marshal Claude Perrin Victor's 18,000-man I Corps to watch Wellesley and Cuesta, Joseph pulled back to a position at Illescas where he could move to block either Venegas or Wellesley if necessary.

Receiving news that 10,000 Portuguese under General Robert Wilson had reached a position behind his northern flank at Escalona, Victor retreated toward Madrid. In fact Wilson only had 4,000 Portuguese and Spanish troops and was soon forced to withdraw from his isolated position. On 1 August, Wellesley got news that the French were driving a small Spanish force under Marquis Del Reino from its position at the Puerto de Baños, a mountain pass to the north. Though Wellesley still believed that the French force was not large, he could not ignore the threat to his supply line to Portugal. In fact, Plasencia was captured by the French on the 1st. That day, Cuesta detached his 5,000-man 5th Division under Major General Bassecourt to investigate. After a heated debate with Cuesta, Wellesley agreed to move west while the Spanish general defended Talavera against Victor. On 3 August Wellesley marched west from Talavera to Oropesa with 18,000 British troops. He believed that he and Bassecourt were facing less than 15,000 Frenchmen and hoped to clear them away from his supply lines. Instead, the British commander was unwittingly marching into the jaws of Soult's 50,000-man host.

=== Scramble to safety ===
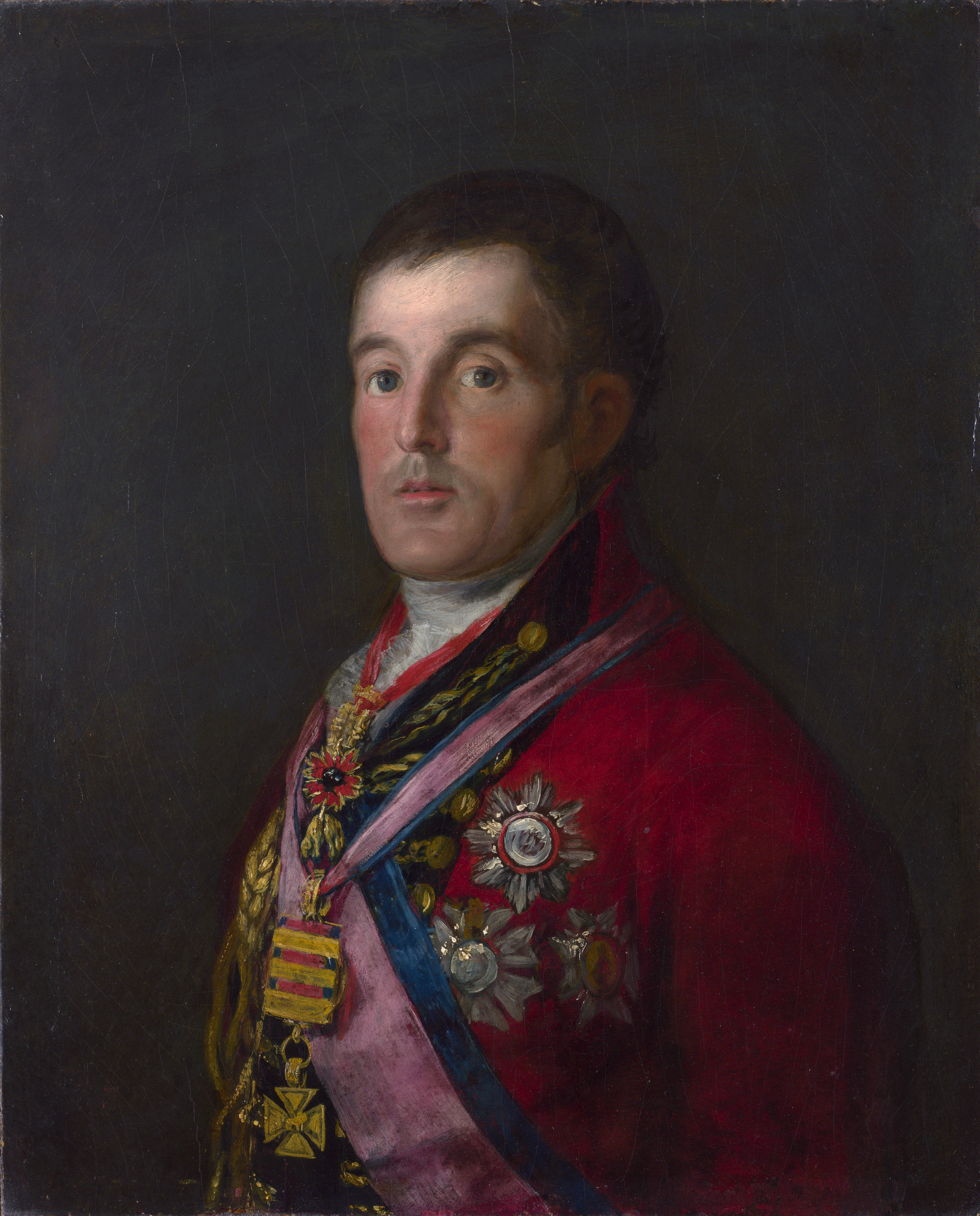
Arthur Wellesley, painting by Francisco Goya

By this time, Mortier's and Wellesley's cavalry were already bickering near Navalmoral only about 30 miles (48.3 km) west of Oropesa. On 3 August, the French horsemen captured a Spanish courier carrying a message from Wellesley to General William Erksine at Lisbon in which Soult's forces were estimated at only 12,000 men. Soult saw that Wellesley was marching right into his hands. Luckily for the Allies, Spanish guerillas caught a French agent near Ávila and delivered his message to Cuesta on the 3rd. It was a note from Soult to Joseph, informing the king that he was advancing with over 30,000 soldiers. Cuesta quickly passed along the message to Wellesley.

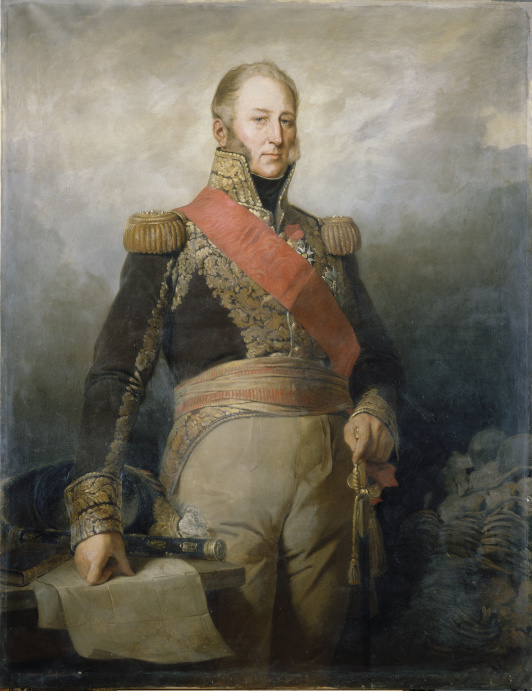
Marshal Édouard Mortier

Alerted to imminent danger, the British commander instantly ordered a retreat across the bridge at Arzobispo. For his part, Cuesta immediately led his army in retreat from Talavera to Oropesa, abandoning the British hospitals. With only about 40 wagons and carts available, 1,500 badly wounded men were left behind. The remainder were told to make their way as best they could. Eventually, 2,000 hobbled into the British lines. Another 500 either died en route or were captured by the French. The ones who were made prisoner by the French were well cared for. Cuesta could have crossed the Tagus at Talavera and retreated on the south bank. However, the roads on that side pass through the Sierra de Guadalupe and were so bad that the Spanish army would have had to abandon its artillery and wagon train. Instead, Cuesta took the risk of marching on the north bank, where the French were known to be at large.

By the evening of 4 August, Wellesley's army was safe on the south bank of the Tagus at Arzobispo. But Cuesta stubbornly refused to retreat. When Mortier's vanguard appeared before him, the Spanish general lashed out at it and drove it back. Believing that he was facing both Cuesta and Wellesley, Mortier became cautious and called for assistance from Soult. During the entire day of the 5th, Cuesta foolishly offered battle with the bridge of Arzobispo at his back, yet Mortier held back. By 6 August when both Soult and Mortier were massed for battle, they found their quarry had withdrawn across the Tagus. As it happened, this was the only opportunity that the French had for inflicting great damage on the Spanish army. As historian Charles Oman wrote, "Soult's best chance was gone before he was even aware of it."

Worried about his supply line to Portugal, Wellesley ordered Craufurd to march west with his own brigade and General Rufane Donkin's brigade to cover the Almaraz crossing. On 6 August, the last day of the march, the troops marched 15 hours on a meal of boiled wheat and dried peas without salt or meat. One participant later recalled that the straggling was the worst he ever saw in the entire war. Craufurd reached Almaraz with 4,000 British troops and joined 1,500 Spaniards under Del Reino. Ney's French troops arrived on the north bank the next day. After retreating from the Puerto de Baños, Del Reino crossed to the south bank of the Tagus at Almaraz and dismantled the pontoon bridge on the 2nd. After a difficult march over bad roads, two divisions of Wellesley's army reached Deleitosa on 7 August, within supporting distance of Almaraz. Another British division was holding Mesas de Ibor. That day, the head of Cuesta's column was approaching Mesas de Ibor where there was an immensely strong defensive position. The rest of the Spanish army struggled slowly over the hills. To cover the movement, the Spanish divisions of Bassecourt and Lieutenant General Alburquerque formed a rear guard at the Arzobispo bridge. Meanwhile, Victor's I Corps occupied Talavera on the 6th, but it remained to the east of the theater of action.

== Battle ==
=== Deployment ===
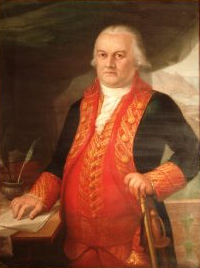
Gregorio de la Cuesta

The Spanish troops left the Arzobispo bridge intact, but they threw up barricades to defend it and assigned infantry to hold the old towers dating to medieval times. On the south bank only 30 yards (27 m) from the bridge a 12-gun redoubt crowned a small hill. Altogether, Alburquerque commanded Bassecourt's 5,000 foot soldiers and his own division of 3,000 horsemen. A ford was nearby, but since it was very narrow and difficult to locate, Cuesta hoped that his rear guard could hold back Soult's superior numbers. In fact, Soult spent the entire day of 7 August looking over the strong Spanish position and sending out scouts to find other crossings.

The town of Arzobispo is situated on the north bank of the Tagus. The village of Azután is on the south bank to the east, with the ford located between the village and the bridge. Villar del Pedroso is south of the bridge and Valdelacasa de Tajo is to the southwest. During the day Spanish cavalrymen carelessly rode out into the river to water their horses, revealing the possible location of the ford. That night, French officers conducted a meticulous search and discovered the hidden ford. They found that the ford was deep for only a short distance under the north bank and shallow the rest of the way. After being advised that an assault across the ford was feasible, Soult determined to attack the following day.

Soult also ordered Ney to attack across the Tagus at Almaraz and sent maps of a ford near that location. However, though the ford existed, the maps were in error. Ney sent a party of dragoons to look for it, but they never found it. In fact, Craufurd's defenders were aware of the ford and troops were in a good position to defend it. The Almaraz ford was no less than 4 feet (1.2 m) deep, narrow, and barely usable.

=== Forces ===
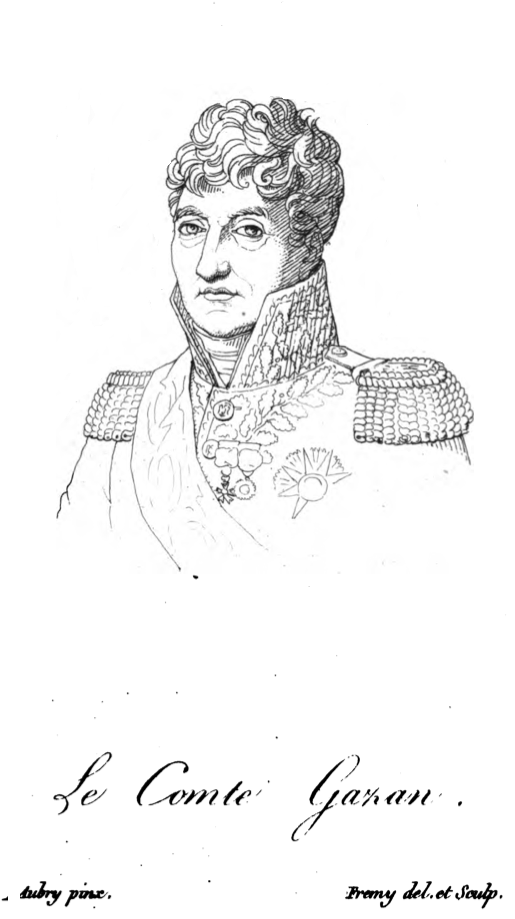
Honoré Gazan

Alburquerque's 2nd Cavalry Division was made up of the Alcantara, Almanza, Infante and Pavia Cavalry Regiments, six squadrons of the 1st and 2nd Extremadura Hussar Regiments, and one squadron of the Carabineros Reales. Bassecourt's 5th Division included two battalions each of the 1st Real Marina and Murcia Infantry Regiments, the 1st Battalion of the Reyna Regiment, the 3rd Battalion of the Africa Regiment, and either one or three battalions of the Provincial de Sigüenza Regiment. The Spanish artillery counted 16 guns.

General of Brigade Jean-Baptiste Girard and General of Division Honoré Théodore Maxime Gazan led the two infantry divisions in Mortier's V Corps while Colonel Henri Pierre Delaage led the corps cavalry brigade. In February 1809, Girard's 1st Division comprised three battalions each of the 17th Light, 40th Line, 64th Line, and 88th Line Infantry Regiments and four battalions of the 34th Line. Gazan's 2nd Division consisted of three battalions each of the 21st, 28th, 100th, and 103rd Line Infantry Regiments. Delaage commanded the 10th Hussar and 21st Chasseurs à Cheval Regiments. The corps artillery included 30 artillery pieces. General of Division Louis Gabriel Suchet led the 1st Division in February, but he transferred to command the III Corps in April taking with him one battalion of the 64th Line as an escort.

Generals of Division Armand Lebrun de La Houssaye and Jean Thomas Guillaume Lorge led one and a half divisions of cavalry. Houssaye commanded the 3rd Dragoon Division which consisted of the 17th, 18th, 19th, and 27th Dragoon Regiments. Lorge directed the 4th Dragoon Division which was made up of the 13th, 15th, 22nd, and 25th Dragoons. However, since February, one brigade of Lorge's dragoons had been detached to serve with Ney's corps. This unit was led by General of Brigade François Fournier and it probably comprised the 15th and 25th Dragoons, which were still with the VI Corps at the Battle of Tamames in October 1809. General of Brigade Pierre Benoît Soult led the II Corps cavalry which included the 1st Hussar, 8th Dragoon, 22nd Chasseurs à Cheval, and Hanoverian Chevau-léger Regiments. The II Corps infantry divisions were led by Generals of Division Pierre Hugues Victoire Merle, Henri François Delaborde, and Étienne Heudelet de Bierre.

=== Assault ===
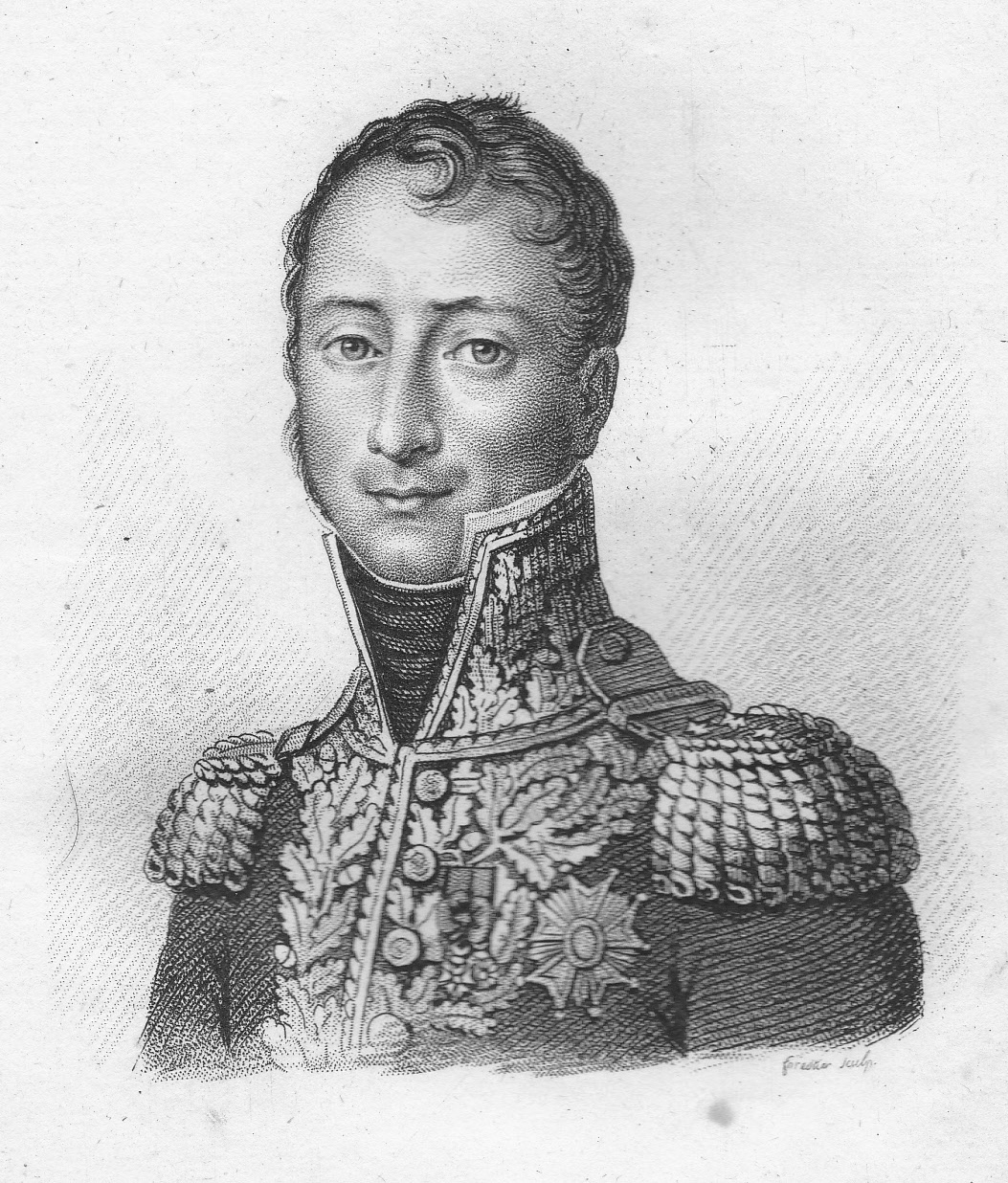
Auguste Caulaincourt

Alburquerque posted one cavalry regiment at the river bank and only two or three battalions to hold the Arzobispo bridge and the artillery redoubt behind it. The rest of the infantry and cavalry were held well back from the river. Soult cleverly planned his assault to occur during the Spanish siesta. La Houssaye's dragoon division would spearhead the attack, followed in turn by Lorge's brigade, the II Corps cavalry, and the V Corps horsemen. The 4,000 troopers were trailed by Girard's division, of which one brigade would follow the cavalry and one brigade would rush the bridge if the cavalry attack succeeded. Gazan's division was ordered to support Girard, while the II Corps infantry waited in reserve. As soon as the assault commenced, the light artillery batteries were instructed to unlimber at the river bank and take the enemy guns under fire.

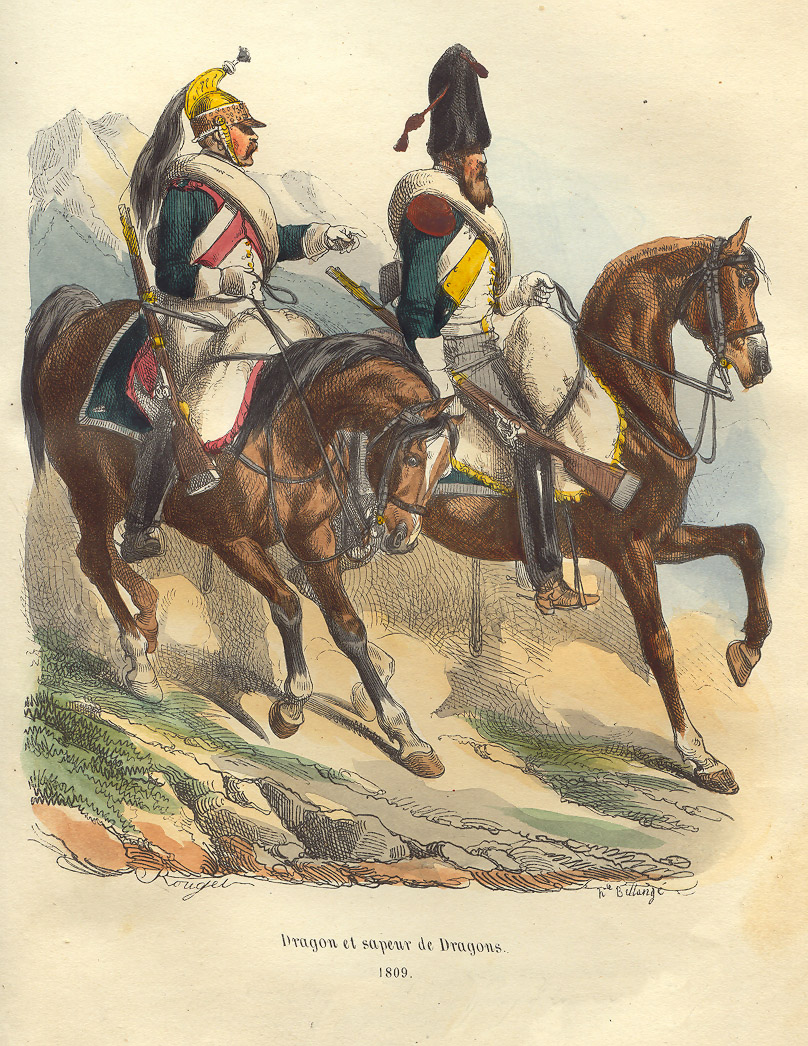
French dragoons in 1809

About 1:30 PM on 8 August 1809, the 600 dragoons of General of Brigade Auguste-Jean-Gabriel de Caulaincourt's brigade burst out of cover, trotted down to the river bank, and splashed into the river. They rapidly navigated the deep part of the ford and soon reached the shallows on the south bank. The 1st Extremadura Hussar Regiment and an infantry battalion from the bridge defenders tried to oppose the French cavalry. Caulaincourt's troopers set upon the Spanish hussars and soon routed them. The victorious French horsemen regrouped and charged the infantry. With its adversaries galloping toward it, the battalion tried to form square, but was unable to close the rear face before the dragoons charged through the gap. As the square broke up, many Spanish foot soldiers were hewn down or surrendered.

As Caulaincourt's dragoons disposed of their opponents, the mass of French cavalry poured across the ford behind them. At this moment Soult waved forward the infantry brigade assigned to attack the bridge. Led by the 1st Battalion of the 40th Line Infantry Regiment, the French dashed forward. They were aided by a crossfire of horse artillery pieces and skirmisher fire. Seeing that the French cavalry would soon cut them off, the Spanish infantry fired two badly aimed volleys at their attackers and took to their heels. The redoubt and all its guns were captured by the French. Both of Girard's brigades reached the south bank with the loss of only a few men who lost their footing at the ford and drowned.

Alburquerque frantically rallied his divisions to resist the sudden attack. Four battalions of infantry formed up across the highway about a mile south of the bridge while the cavalry hurriedly saddled their horses. As soon as his troopers were ready, Alburquerque flung them at the French without waiting to form them into proper regiments or lines. As a result, 2,500 Spanish cavalry charged into La Houssaye's dragoons in a great ill-formed mass. But Lorge's dragoons and the corps light cavalry units were across the river and quickly joined the melee. Within a short time Alburquerque's overmatched horsemen were defeated.

Alburquerque bravely tried to turn the tables with his last intact unit, the 2nd Extremadura Hussars, but this effort collapsed and the Spanish cavalry scattered with their French counterparts in full pursuit. Seeing their cavalry supports routed, Bassecourt's infantry formations melted away. Retreating across the hills, the Spanish foot soldiers got away with few additional casualties. The chase ended when the French cavalry encountered one infantry and one cavalry division of Cuesta's army drawn up in battle formation across the Valdelacasa road.

== Results ==
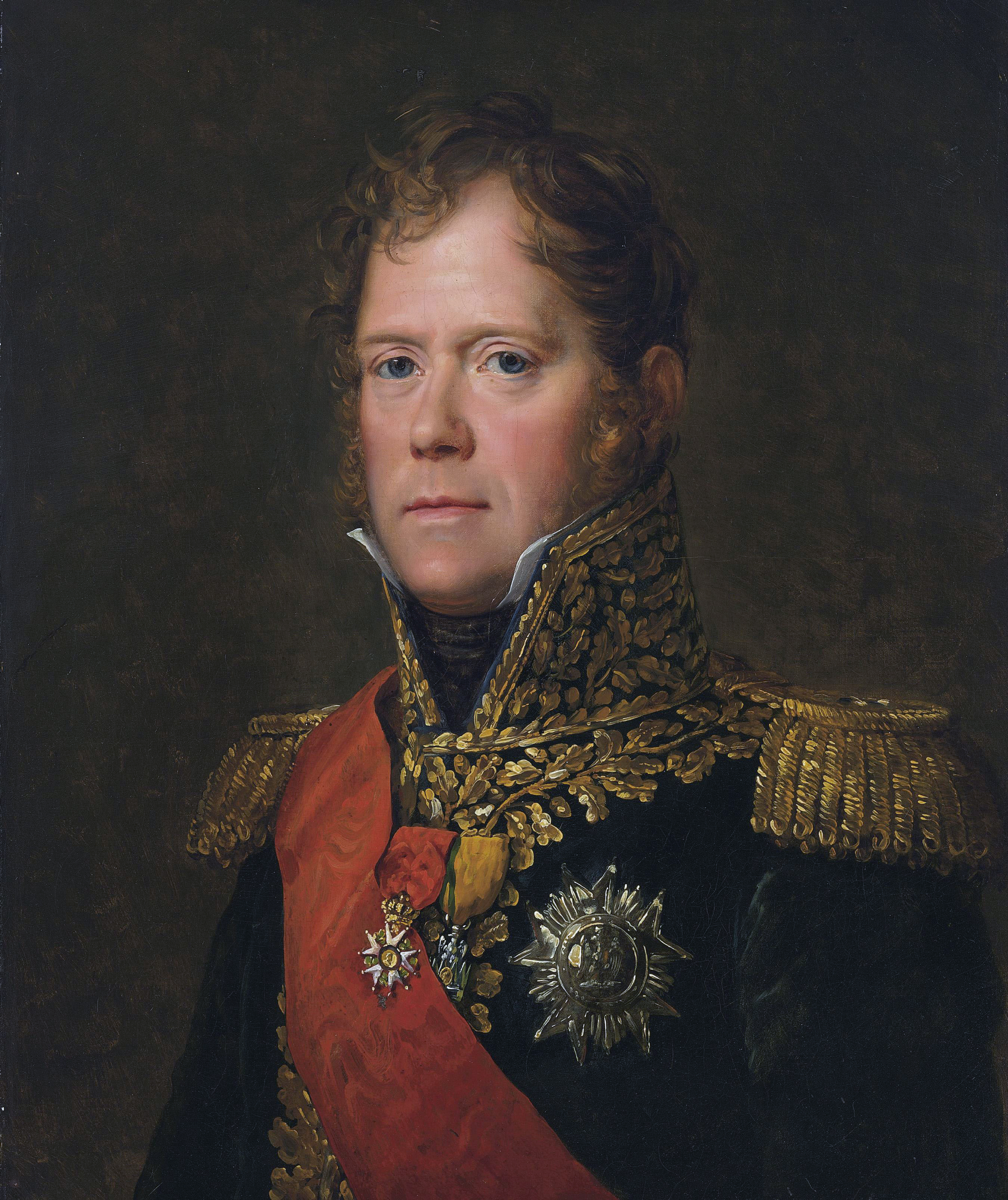
Marshal Michel Ney

The Spanish suffered 800 killed and wounded plus 600 soldiers captured. Also taken by the French were 400 horses, 16 artillery pieces, and one color. The French admitted losing 28 killed and 83 wounded cavalrymen and four wounded artillerymen, plus a few foot soldiers drowned. During the pursuit, Soult's cavalry came across a convoy containing guns seized from the French at Talavera. According to Oman, 14 or 15 field pieces were recovered, while historian Digby Smith asserted that the French recaptured all 17. This windfall enabled Sébastiani and General of Division Jean François Leval to make the bogus claim that they lost no guns at Talavera. The 17 guns in question consisted of four 8-pound, four 6-pound, and one 4-pound cannons, two 6-inch howitzers, and six pieces of unknown caliber. Of these, Oman noted that all but one 8-pound and one 6-pound cannons were recovered.

Seeing that it was pointless to pursue his enemies into the mountains, Soult halted his offensive. He hoped to regroup his army for a major invasion of Portugal but he was overruled. Joseph ordered Ney's VI Corps to return north to help Kellermann and placed Soult's two remaining corps on the defensive at Plasencia and Talavera. This deployment freed Victor's I Corps to march east against Venegas. The next battle was the Battle of Almonacid on 11 August 1809. The following day, Ney's corps bumped into Wilson's column on its return march at the Battle of Puerto de Baños.

These events ended the Talavera campaign. Wellesley was ennobled as Viscount Wellington for his victory. With his troops starving, the British commander withdrew his army to the neighborhood of Badajoz where he was able to secure sufficient supplies. Wellington learned a signal lesson about the importance of logistics. Disgusted with Cuesta's erratic behavior and the ineptitude of the Spanish military, Wellington vowed not to cooperate with the Spanish armies until their generals and troops became more dependable. To the British government he argued that he could hold Portugal against a French army of 70,000 to 80,000 men. To this end Wellington issued the orders to build the Lines of Torres Vedras in order to protect Lisbon.
