= Tomás Zeraín =

Spanish army officer (1750–1831)

- Born: 1750; Vitoria
- Died: 1831 (aged 80–81)
- Conflicts: War of the Pyrenees; Battle of Truillas; Peninsular War; Battle of Alcolea Bridge; Battle of Almonacid; Battle of Ocaña

Tomás Zeraín (1750–1831) was a Spanish military commander.

== Early career ==
Zeraín enlisted as a cadet in the Brigade of Royal Carabiniers in 1768, transferring to the Algarve Cavalry Regiment in 1773. He returned to the Royal Carabiniers as a standard bearer in 1776, and by 1789 had been promoted to colonel.

During the War of the Pyrenees he saw action at Masdeu, Perpignan, Rives-Altes, Bernet, Peyrestortes and Truillas.

Zeraín was promoted to Cavalry brigadier in 1804.

== Peninsular War ==
After seeing action at Alcolea, he was promoted to field marshal in 1808.

Given command of the 5th Division of the Army of Extremadura, Zeraín served under Venegas at Almonacid and then under Aréizaga at Ocaña, where he was wounded by a bullet to the neck.

In 1810, after being forced to retreat by Marshal Victor to Seville and from there to Ayamonte, he handed over his command to Copons.

He was then appointed interim governor of Mahón, until General Grimarest arrived to take up his command there in September 1811.

== Post-war career ==
He was promoted to lieutenant general in 1829.
