= Luis Alejandro Bassecourt =

French-born Spanish army officer (1769–1826)

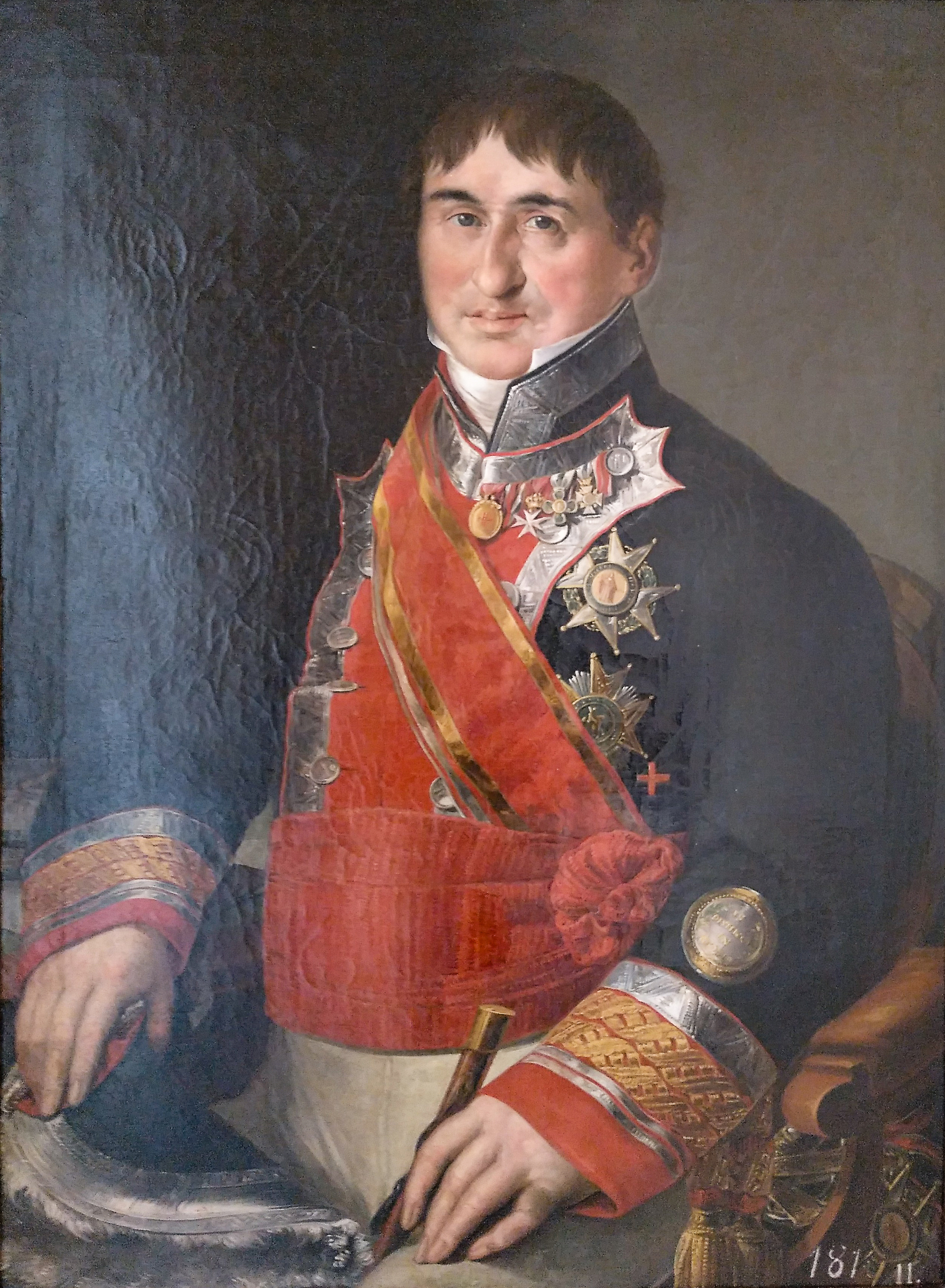
- Portrait of General Luis Alejandro de Bassecourt by Miguel Parra Abril (Real Academia de Bellas Artes de San Carlos de Valencia)
- Born: 1 July 1769; Château d'Heuchin, Fontaines-les-Boulans, France
- Died: 17 January 1826 (aged 56) Zaragoza, Spain
- Conflicts: Peninsular War; Battle of Tudela; Combat of Tarancón; Battle of Uclés; Battle of Medellín; Battle of Talavera; Battle of Arzobispo

Luis Alejandro Bassecourt y Dupire (1769–1826) was a French-born Spanish military commander, governor of Barcelona and captain general.

== Peninsular War ==
Having been promoted to Fusilier captain in 1805, following the Dos de Mayo Uprising that took place in Madrid on 2–3 May 1808, Bassecourt managed to escape to Andalusia where he was given the task of forming a new battalion of Walloon Guards from the non-French prisoners taken at the Battle of Bailen. He was promoted to brigadier that August and marched his new battalion to Zaragoza to join Castaños's army. There, the unit became the 1st Battalion of the Walloon Guards. Following the Spanish defeat at Tudela Bassecourt withdrew to Cuenca.

Under Venegas, Bassecourt took part in the surprise attack on Perreimond's brigade of dragoons, part of Latour-Maubourg's division, at Tarancón on Christmas Day 1808.

Following the defeat at Uclés (13 January 1809), he was able to escape through the French lines.

Bassecourt was then given command of the Army of La Mancha's 5th Division, serving under Cartaojal.

Alongside the Duke of Alburquerque, Bassecourt fought at the actions of Mora and Consuegra (18 and 22 February 1809), before incorporating his troops into the Army of Extremadura the following month.

Following his participation at the Battle of Medellín (28 March 1809), he was promoted to field marshal in April. Still at the head of the 5th Division (Infantry), he fought at the Battle of Talavera (27–28 July). At the Battle of Arzobispo (8 August 1809) he was forced to retreat, abandoning 16 cannons.

Bassecourt was briefly given command of the remainder of the Army of Extremadura the following September, when Francisco de Eguía marched off with three divisions of infantry and twelve or thirteen regiments of cavalry, some 25,000 men in all, to join Venegas's Army of La Mancha, a united force now exceeding 50,000 sabres and bayonets, with which the Junta intended to take Madrid. In November, Bassecourt handed over his command to the Duke of Alburquerque. Of these two divisions of infantry, numbering some 12,000 troops, plus 2,500 cavalry, Albuquerque had to send a cavalry brigade to join the Army of the North, leaving him with only five cavalry regiments, some 1,500 sabres. Of his infantry, over 4,000 were needed to garrison Badajoz, leaving him only 8,000 men available in the field.

Sent to join Juan Carlos Aréizaga, who had taken over Venegas's command, Bassecourt did not arrive in time to participate at Ocaña.

He was appointed commander-in-chief of the province of Cuenca and president of its junta, in December 1809. In August 1810, he was appointed interim captain general of Valencia. Having established his headquarters at Castellón, he set off to relieve Tortosa, but on his way there was defeated at Ulldecona (26 November 1810), losing over 2,500 troops, and was forced to withdraw to Peñíscola. Fearing a French attack on Sagunto, then known as Murviedro, Bassecourt gave orders to repair the fortifications of the castle.

After having called for a congress in January 1811, and faced with criticism, he dissolved it the following month and had some of its members imprisoned. Replaced by Carlos O'Donnell the following April, he returned to his former military command at Cuenca, his unit being named the 3rd Division of the 2nd Army (or Army of Valencia), with 2,053 men under arms, plus a Cavalry regiment.

On 15 October 1811, together with Mahy's troops, Bassecourt occupied the city of Cuenca, which had been abandoned by its garrison. However, he was forced to withdraw into the mountain range of Las Cabrillas the following month by the approach of Darmagnac's division. Reinforced by José Pascual de Zayas y Chacón's division, Bassecourt then forced the French troops to withdraw back to Cuenca.

Following the fall of Valencia (January 1812), Bassecourt was forced to abandon the province of Cuenca, first withdrawing to Requena and then into Aragon.

== Post-war career ==
Bassecourt was promoted to lieutenant general in 1815, and lieutenant colonel of the 2nd Regiment of Infantry Guards in 1819.

Confined to barracks at Salamanca when the Constitution was declared by the Trienio Liberal (1820–1823), he was appointed commander-in-chief of the province when the Duke of Angoulême's Hundred Thousand Sons of Saint Louis entered Spain.

Ferdinand VII of Spain appointed Bassecourt governor of Barcelona in 1823 and second-in-command of the Captaincy general of Catalonia the following year.

In 1824 he was appointed captain general of Valencia and Murcia; the following year, captain general of Granada and captain general of Aragón.
