= Diego Ballesteros =

Spanish army officer (1759–1840)

- Born: 1759; Badajoz, Badajoz
- Died: 10 May 1840 (aged 80–81) Madrid
- Conflicts: Peninsular War

Diego Martín Ballesteros (1759–1840) was a Spanish military commander.

== Early career ==
Promoted to lieutenant in 1788, he saw action in the War of the Pyrenees as aide-de-camp to lieutenant general Manuel Moncada, Prince of Monforte.

As a captain in 1794, Ballesteros saw further action in the War of the Oranges and in 1803 was promoted to brigadier.

== Peninsular War ==
Having fought under the orders of General Castaños at Bailén, Ballesteros later commanded the Granada Regiment of Dragoons at Almonacid, where he was taken prisoner and sent to France for the remainder of the war.

== Post-war career ==
On his release and return to Spain Ballesteros was promoted to field marshal. He was appointed governor of Gerona in 1821 and promoted to lieutenant general in 1929.
