= Almonacid de Toledo =

Coordinates: 39°44′N 3°52′W

- municipality
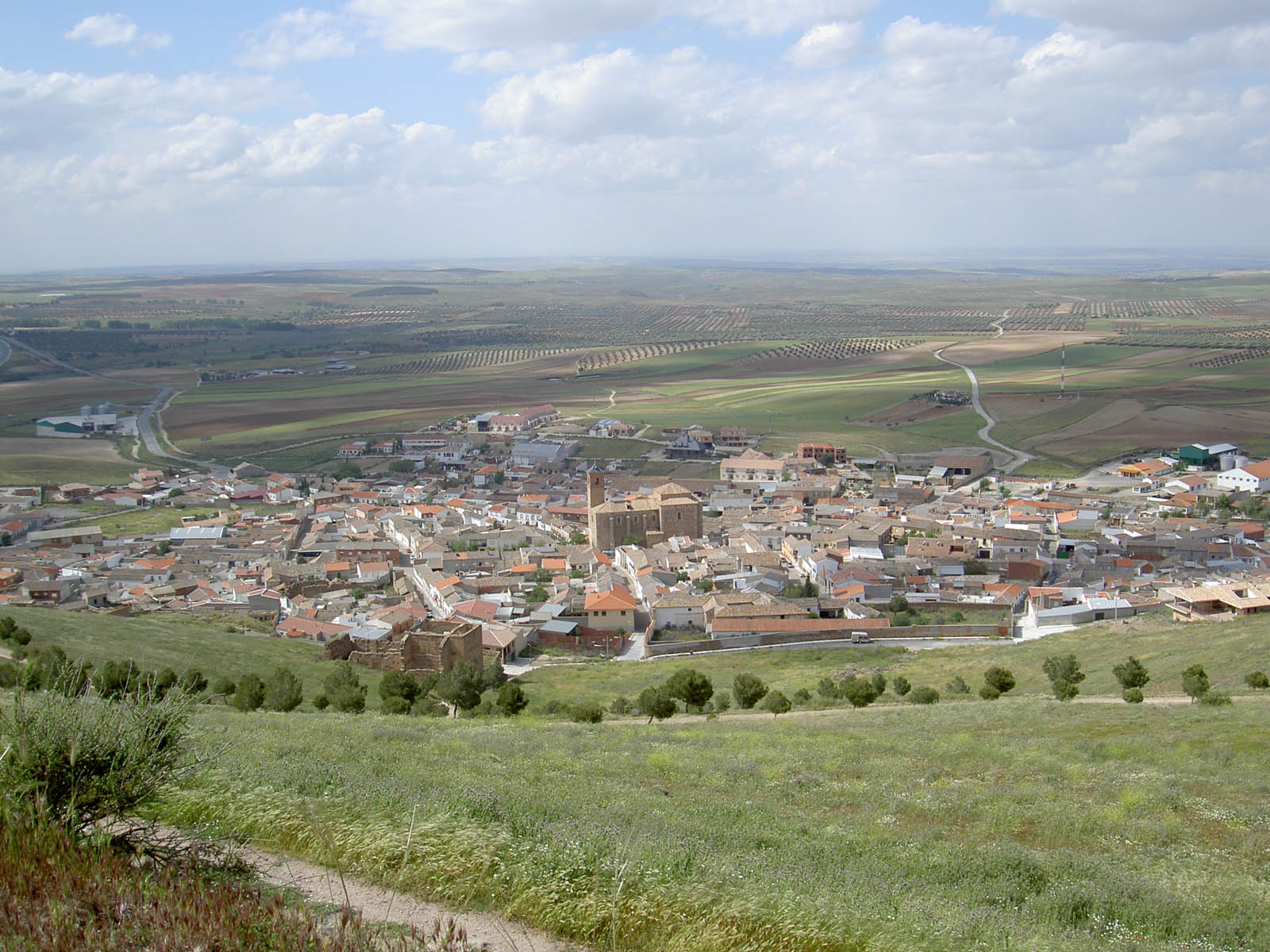

- Flag Coat of arms

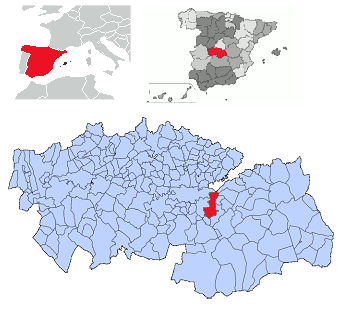
- Country: Spain
- Autonomous community: Castile-La Mancha
- Province: Toledo

Area
  - Total: 96 km^{2} (37 sq mi)
- Elevation: 720 m (2,360 ft)

Population (2025-01-01)
  - Total: 991
  - Density: 10/km^{2} (27/sq mi)
- Time zone: UTC+1 (CET)
  - Summer (DST): UTC+2 (CEST)

Almonacid de Toledo is a municipality located in the province of Toledo, Castile-La Mancha, Spain. It is located off the Autovía de los Viñedos.

According to the 2006 census (INE), the municipality had a population of 813 inhabitants. In 2023 it was 926.

The battle of Almonacid took place here in 1809 during the Napoleonic Wars. The battle was won by French troops commanded by General Sebastiani and it is recorded on the Arc de Triomphe in Paris. The commanding officer of the Spanish troops was General Venegas.

== Castle ==
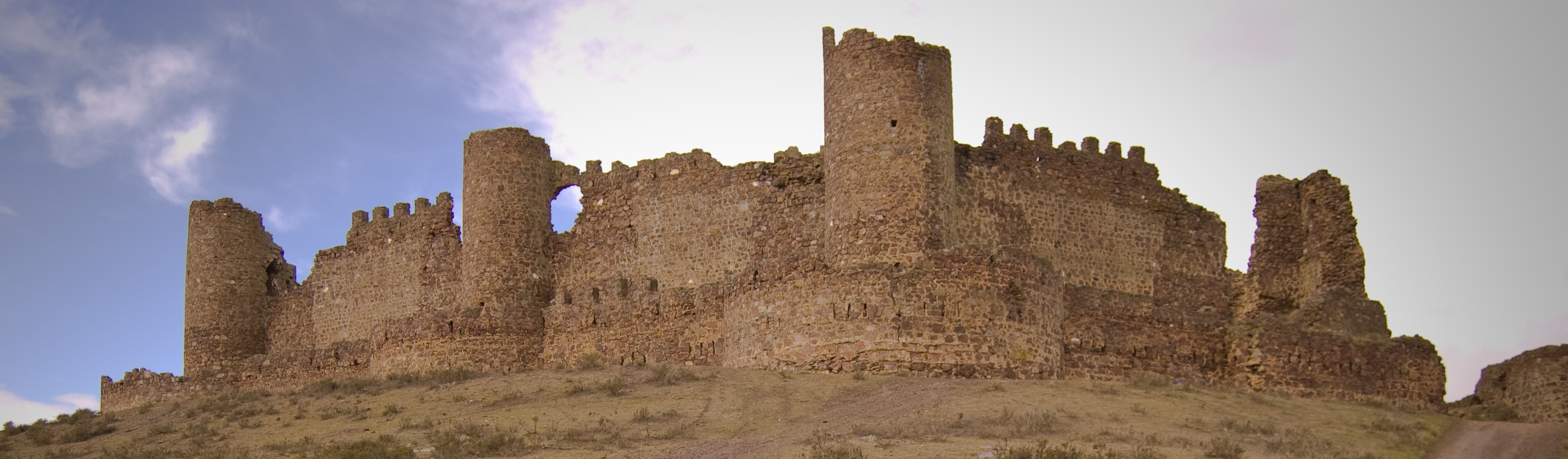
Castle

The village has a medieval castle. The ruined building is open to the public. The structure has a perimeter of about 220 metres. It may date from the 12th century, but it appears to have replaced an older castle of Visigothic or Islamic origin. Set on a hill-top, the castle has visual connection with fortifications at the neighbouring settlements of Mora de Toledo and Orgaz.
