= Francisco González de Castejón =

Spanish military officer

Francisco González de Castejón y Veraiz (1767–1848) was a Spanish military commander.

== Peninsular War ==
At the outbreak of the war, Castejón was a member of the Junta de Soria and participated in raising the battalions of Soria. In September 1808 he was appointed second-in-command of the 3rd Division of the Army of Andalucia and saw action at Tudela, as well as in several skirmishes, for which he was promoted to field marshal in March 1809.

In June 1809, as a brigadier-general, he commanded the 4th Division of Venegas's Army of La Mancha, seeing action at Almonacid (August 1809) where he was wounded in the leg.

The following November he saw action at Ocaña, where his troops were surrounded and defeated by Sebastiani's IV Corps. Castejón was again wounded, and was taken prisoner to Madrid, where he remained until being released in August 1812, when the capital of Spain was liberated by Wellington after his Allied army had defeated the French under Marmont at Salamanca.

== Post-war career ==
In 1813, he was appointed military commander of Campo de Gibraltar and in 1816 he was appointed second-in-command to José de Palafox in Aragón.
