= Monument to the Battle of Talavera =

- Monumento a la Batalla de Talavera
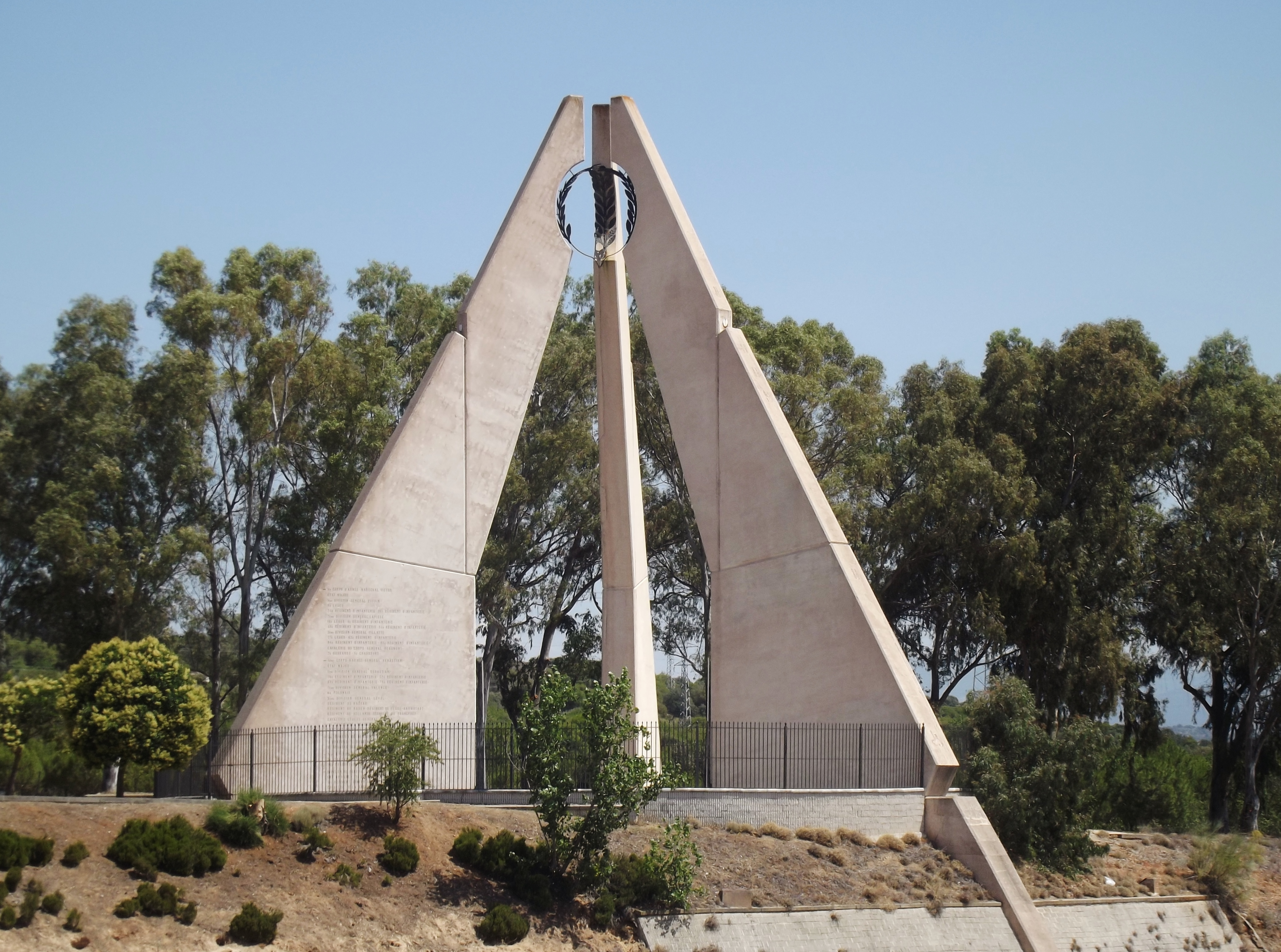
- 39°59′07″N 4°50′51″W
- Location: Talavera de la Reina, Spain
- Height: 27 metres (89 ft)
- Beginning date: 1989
- Completion date: 1990
- Opening date: 2 October 1990
- Dedicated to: Battle of Talavera

The Monument to the Battle of Talavera is a monument located in Talavera de la Reina, Spain. It is a memorial to the casualties of the Battle of Talavera in July 1809, one of the bloodiest of the Peninsular War.

== Description and history ==
Standing 27 metres (89 ft) high, the monument consists of three 300 kg plumes of concrete, representing the Spanish, French and British armies, crowned by a bronze laurel wreath. The losses at the battle accounted for 7,268 dead French soldiers, 5,363 British and about 1,200 Spanish ones. The names of the military units that took part in the battle are engraved on the stone. It was funded by the Spanish Ministry of Public Works.

It lies on the southern foothills of the Cerro Medellín, one of the key locations of the battle, next to the current-day A-5 highway. Built from 1989 to 1990, it was inaugurated on 2 October 1990, during a ceremony attended by a mix of civil and military representatives from Spain, France, the United Kingdom, Belgium, the Netherlands, Portugal, and West Germany, including Narcís Serra (Spanish Minister of Defence), José Bono (president of Castilla–La Mancha) and the Belgian, French, British and West German ambassadors.
