= Vicente Osorio =

Spanish army officer (1767–1826)

- Born: 22 January 1767; Almagro, Ciudad Real
- Died: 18 June 1826 (aged 59) Madrid
- Conflicts: War of the Pyrenees; Battle of Truillas; Peninsular War; Battle of Ocaña; Siege of Valencia (1812)

Vicente Osorio Melgosa (1767–1826) was a Spanish military commander.

== Early career ==
Osorio enlisted as a cadet in the Algarve Regiment, and in 1792 transferred to the Brigade of Royal Carabiniers, seeing action during the War of the Pyrenees. He distinguishedhimself at the Battle of Truillas and was promoted to lieutenant. In 1800 he was promoted to Cavalry colonel and in 1807 to captain of the Royal Carabiniers.

== Peninsular War ==
After the outbreak of the War, Osorio served as adjutant to the Army of the Centre and later as the commander of its flying brigade, seeing action at Ciempozuelos, Arganda, Vaciamadrid, Añover and Almonacid.

Osorio was given command of the Granada Dragoon Regiment in 1809, which he led at Ocaña, where he also led the 4th Division of General Manuel Freire's Cavalry, and at Manzanares, Santa Cruz de Mudela, Alcalá la Real, Vélez Rubio, Lorca and Albacete.

In 1811, as commander of one of the 3rd Army's two Cavalry divisions, again under Freire, he saw action at Baza, Venta del Baúl, at the Battle of Saguntum (Murviedro) and in the early stages of the siege of Valencia. That October he had been appointed sub-inspector general of the 3rd Army's Cavalry, post he held until the end of the war.

== Post-war career ==
In 1815, he was transferred, as field marshal, to the Observation Corps of Aragón, and as commander-in-chief at Benasque, and the following year to Almagro.

In 1818 Osorio was appointed inspector general of Cavalry and during the Trienio Liberal he was the commander-in-chief of the province of Ciudad Real. During the Ominous Decade he was given command of a Cavalry brigade of the Guardia Real, at the head of which he captured the French-Spanish ultraroyalist agitator Jorge Bessières, who would be executed a few days later by order of the Conde de España, commander-in-chief of the Guardia Real. Osorio was commended with the Laureate Cross of Saint Ferdinand for his part in this operation.
