= Battle of Almonacid =

1809 battle of the Peninsular War

- Part of the Peninsular War
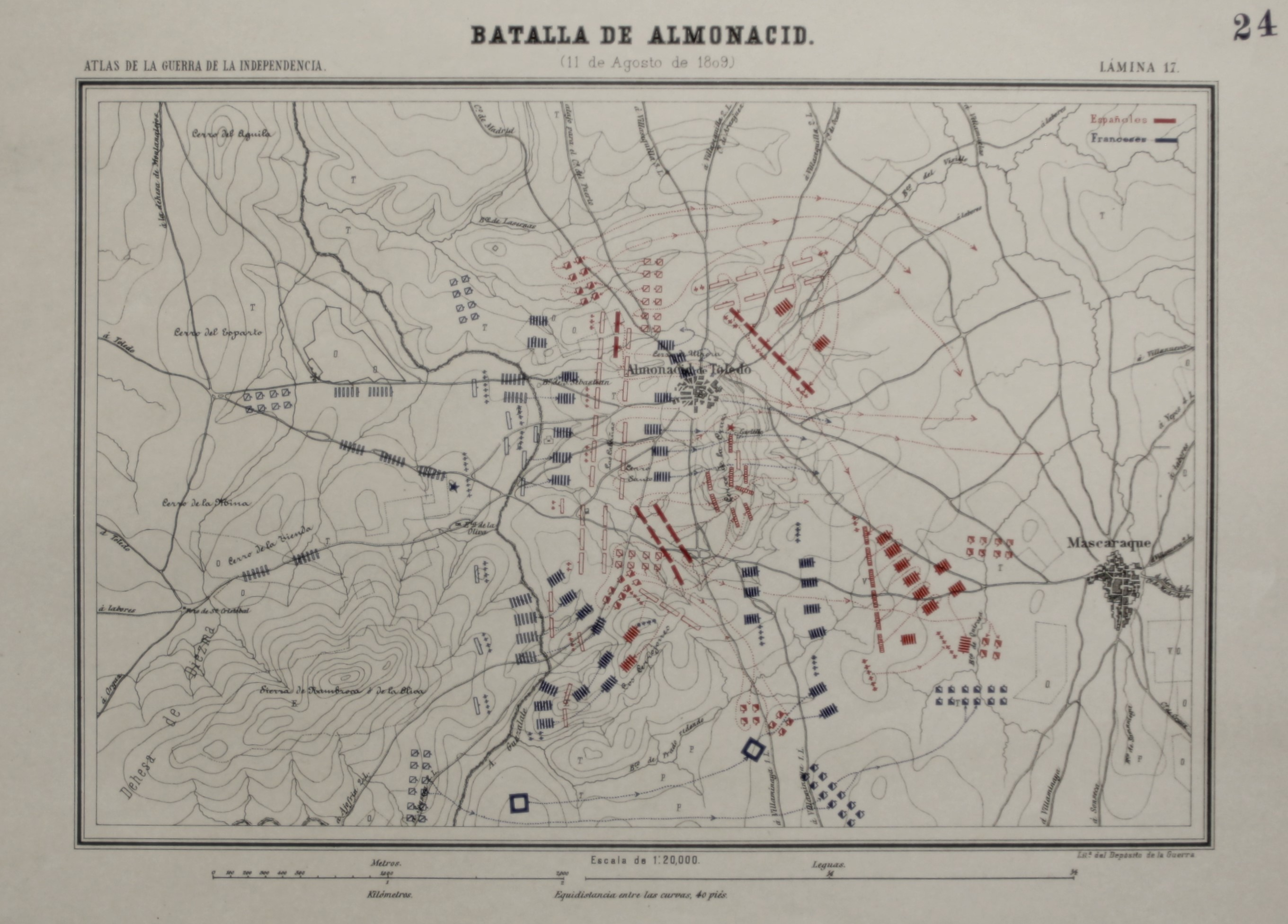
- Spanish map of the battle (1868)
Date	11 August 1809
Location	Almonacid, near Toledo, Spain 39°44′N 3°52′W
Result	French victory

Belligerents
France; Duchy of Warsaw	Spain

Commanders and leaders
(First French Empire) Horace Sébastiani	(Spain) Francisco Javier Venegas

Strength
28,797	28,107

Casualties and losses
2,400	3,300–3,500 killed & wounded 2,000 captured 20–21 guns lost Total: 5,500

Peninsular War: Castile & Andalusia
current battle

The Battle of Almonacid was fought on 11 August 1809 during the Peninsular War between Sébastiani's IV Corps of the French Peninsular Army, which King Joseph of Spain had withdrawn from the Battle of Talavera to defend Madrid, and the Spanish Army of La Mancha under General Venegas. After the decisive charges of Polish uhlans, the battle resulted in a French victory.

== Background ==
The Spanish campaign in late 1809 started with the Battle of Talavera.

=== Prelude ===
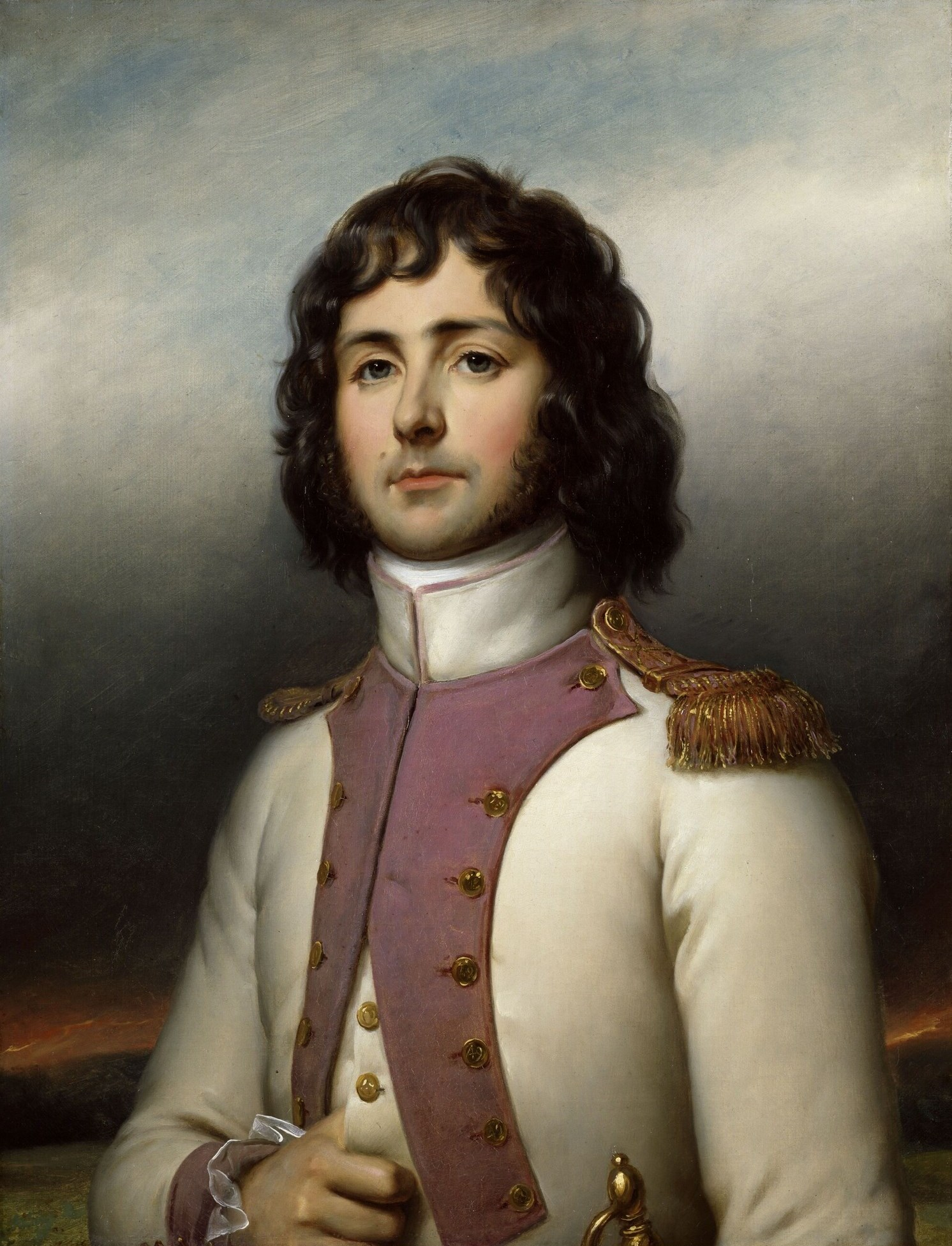
Sebastiani

After the defeat at Talavera, King Joseph retreated with his French army to the vicinity of Toledo and ordered General Sébastiani to attack the portion of the Spanish La Mancha army threatening Madrid under the command of Venegas at Aranjuez. On 5 August, however, due in large part to the hastiness of the attack and the limited number of Tagus River crossings, Sébastiani and the French forces were defeated in a short battle at Aranjuez. Sébastiani chose next to flank Venegas by moving his army west, crossing the Tagus at Toledo, and then returning to the east to attack the Spanish. Venegas, however, anticipated that Sébastiani would attempt such a tactic and moved his forces westward south of the Tagus. On 10 August, both armies were concentrated in the vicinity of Almonacid.

Venegas' Spanish force consisted of 22,000 infantry, more than 3,000 horses and 29 pieces of artillery, and was organized in five divisions commanded respectively by Luis Lacy, Gaspar de Vigodet, Pedro Agustín Girón, Francisco González de Castejón and Tomás de Zeraín. Miguel de los Ríos and the Marquess of Gelo served as Majors General of the cavalry and the infantry, while Brigadiers Antonio de la Cruz and Juan Bouligni were Commanders-in-chief of Artillery and Engineers. They were so confident of victory that they disregarded all the established rules for camping out during times of military conflict, especially being so close to the enemy. Sébastiani's French force had crossed the Tagus on 9 August, settling that same day in the nearby town of Nambroca, a league away from Almonacid.

The Spanish commander, after hearing the opinion of the other generals, who agreed with him despite being aware of the retreat of the allied army from Talavera de la Reina towards Extremadura, decided to attack the French on 12 August in order to rest his troops. The French army anticipated this and appeared in front of the Spanish positions at half past five in the morning of 11 August, with 14,000 troops of the IV Corps commanded by Sebastiani, who attacked the Spanish immediately without waiting for the reserve under the command of Dessolles and King Joseph Bonaparte in person to come up.

The La Mancha army hastily positioned itself in front of Almonacid and on both sides in the following formation: Vigodet's division, a little behind, on the far right, with much of the cavalry; continuing to the left, Castejón's division was established on the Utrera hill, Zerain's division beside it covering the Santo hill, and Lacy's division closer at the Guazalate stream; the 3rd division, Girón's, acting as reserve, was spread between the heights of Cerrojones, on the extreme left and the key to the entire line of battle, and the Cerro de la Cruz or Castillo hill, named for the castle ruins on its summit.

== Battle ==
=== First attacks ===
After intense artillery fire, returned in kind by the Spaniards, Jean François Leval with Polish and German-Dutch divisions attacked the Spanish left wing. The Bailén and Jaén battalions of the 3rd Division twice repelled the Poles, but received no reinforcement from the reserve. With the Polish division encouraged by the Germans coming up to their left, the French army was able to storm the vital position of the Cerrojones, even though at great cost (the three Polish regiments making up the division lost 47 officers). The French right was supported by a large body of troops advancing over the level ground at the foot of that hill, carrying out an envelopment on the extreme left, not stopped by a cavalry charge by the horsemen of Fernando VII and Granada, led by Colonel Antonio Zea and Commander Nicolás Chacón (Captain Francisco Soto died in this charge). The 1st division, in order to confront the Germans, had to withdraw somewhat and to reposition itself diagonally to the rearguard. However, as the centre and right were now retreating as well, under attack by the remaining enemy forces supported by the reserve which had just arrived under Dessolles and Joseph Bonaparte, this division was itself forced to take refuge on the Castillo hill.

=== Start of the battle ===
The 4th division was heavily attacked by numerous enemy artillery and could only respond with one horsedrawn battery. Their chief Lieutenant-Colonel, captain of the Artillery, Jose Chacón, soon fell mortally wounded and died from these injuries on 13 August in Tembleque. Lieutenant-Colonel Alvaro Chacón from this same Corps also died on the battlefield. The regiments of Jerez de la Frontera, Córdoba and the Spanish Guards distinguished themselves through their calmness and courage, the second under the command of its colonel Brigadier Francisco Carvajal. The cavalry on the right did not pursue the charge launched to contain the French, and thus the French were able to press their attack with continued vigour. The 5th division also yielded the field in a similar manner and it was not long before the enemy also occupied the town and the Castillo hill. There, the Spanish troops were unable to resist the terrible rain of projectiles that the French artillery aimed at them from all sides.

Vigodet's division intervened in time to prevent an immediate and disastrous defeat, speedily and skilfully carrying out a change of front, protected by lively fire from the Spanish guns. This manoeuvre contained the pursuit of the disorganised forces of the centre and also restored order on the left, where the Polish and German divisions threatened to surround the line completely and to cut off its retreat. There the 2nd division mounted renewed resistance to the advance of the victors, who then tried everywhere to break through this unexpected obstacle that was preventing them making the most of their victory. A large mass of Milhaud's much-feared dragoons charged towards the left, and in that last period of the battle the troops of Vigodet covered themselves in glory. All fought with courage and self-sacrifice: the artillery, firing during withdrawal, covering with shrapnel the heads of the imperial columns; the cavalry, formed by riders of different Corps that went about reuniting the dispersed troops, its steadfastness impressing the very top ranks of the enemy; and the infantry remaining imperturbable amidst the intense fire and the prevailing confusion and disorder. A squad of grenadiers of the Provincial of Ronda sent by Lieutenant Antonio Espinosa, approaching the enemy horsemen with fixed bayonets, was able to stop them and even to pull away a cannon, which was spiked by their leader. The second lieutenant of artillery, Juan Montenegro, also managed to save a gun of his battery, sacrificing himself for his comrades-in-arms. Only the unfortunate accident of an explosion among the ammunition carts, frightening the horses, produced some disorder of which the enemy took advantage, harassing and hounding more closely on the final ascents, to stab a few soldiers and to take some of the guns.

=== End of the battle ===
The French had already taken 2,500 losses and did not continue active pursuit beyond Mora. The defeated Spanish army was able to take the Andalusia highway and arrive in good order at Manzanares. However, on arriving there, false rumours that enemy forces were in Valdepeñas (Ciudad Real) caused many of the Spanish to disperse, not stopping until they got to the Sierra Morena. Spanish losses did not exceed 4,000 men, including those who were killed, wounded and imprisoned. However, among the dead was the commander of the infantry regiment of the first division, Colonel Vicente Martínez, and among the wounded was the colonel of the Granada dragoons, Diego Ballesteros, who remained a prisoner in France until the end of the war.

== Aftermath ==
The Spanish campaign in late 1809 proceeded with the second Madrid offensive in the Battle of Tamames.

== Legacy ==
To commemorate this military feat, a royal decree of 30 May 1816 created a military medal with the following inscription in the centre: "From Fernando VII", and around the edge: "In Almonacid, 11th August 1809").

== Notes ==
Preceded by Battle of Ölper (1809)	Napoleonic Wars; Battle of Almonacid	Succeeded by Battle of Tamames
