= Battle of Talavera =

1809 battle of the Peninsular War

- Part of the Peninsular War
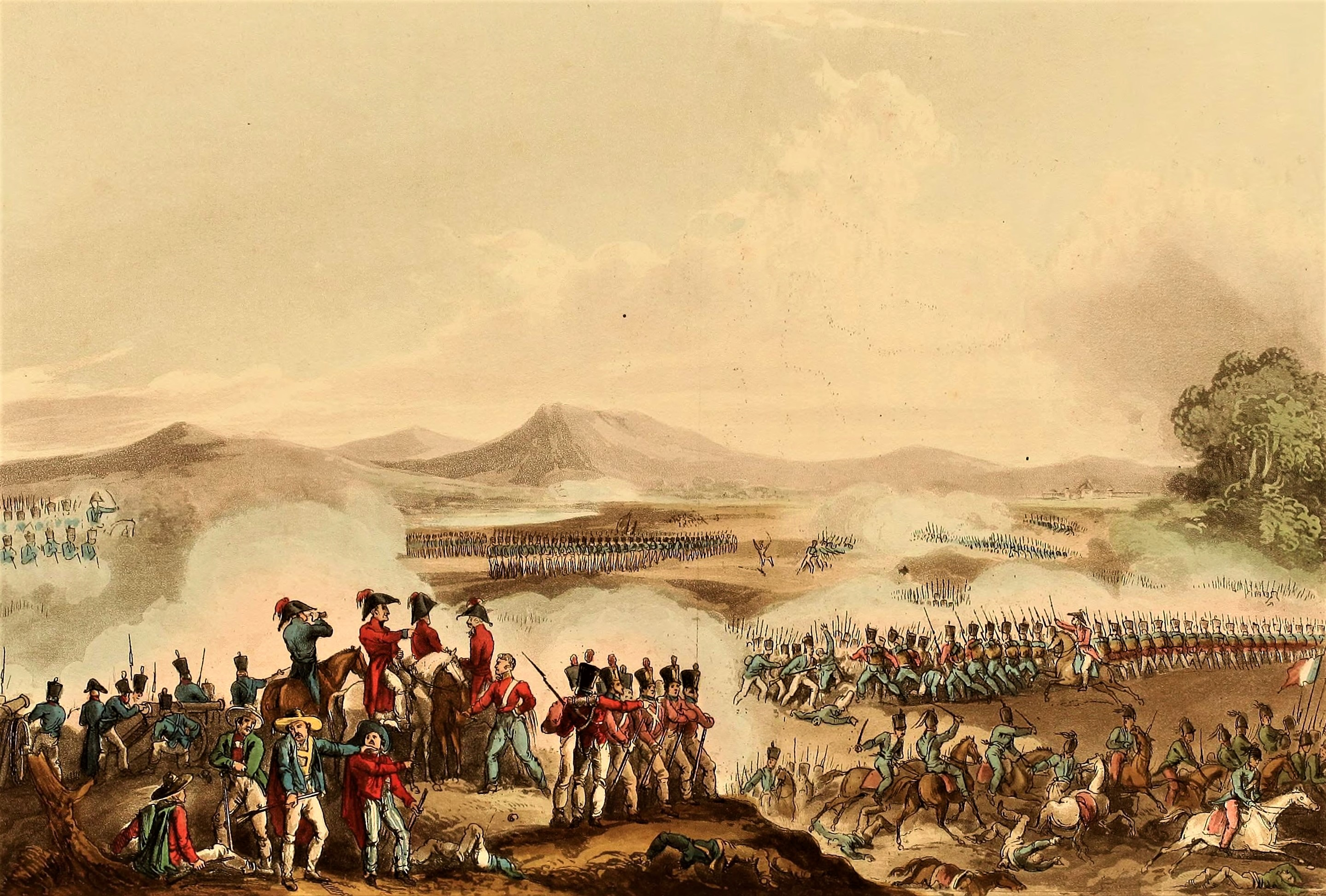
- Illustration of the battle by William Heath
Date	27–28 July 1809
Location	Talavera, Spain 39°58′N 4°50′W
Result	See Aftermath

Belligerents
France; Duchy of Warsaw	United Kingdom; Spain

Commanders and leaders
(First French Empire) Joseph Bonaparte (First French Empire) Jean-Baptiste Jourdan (First French Empire) Claude-Victor Perrin	(United Kingdom of Great Britain and Ireland) Arthur Wellesley (Spain) Gregorio de la Cuesta

Strength
46,138; 80 guns	United Kingdom: 20,641; 30 guns Spain: 34,993; 30 guns Total: 55,634; 60 guns (Note: Although there are estimates of 100 guns in total from some authors, such as Bodart (1908), more modern authors, such as Gates (2001), provide a detailed order of battle and the total comes to 60 guns.)

Casualties and losses
7,268–7,389 killed, wounded or captured 17 guns captured	United Kingdom: 5,363–6,268 killed, wounded or captured Spain: 'several hundred' to 1,200 killed or wounded Total casualties: up to 6,553–7,468 killed, wounded or captured

Peninsular War: Spain
current battle
Wellington in command
Wellington not in command

The Battle of Talavera (27–28 July 1809) was fought just outside the town of Talavera de la Reina, Spain some 120 kilometres (75 mi) southwest of Madrid, during the Peninsular War. At Talavera, a British army under Sir Arthur Wellesley combined with a Spanish army under General Gregorio García de la Cuesta fought in operations against French-occupied Madrid. At nightfall, the French army withdrew a short distance after several of its attacks had been repulsed; the allies, having suffered comparable casualties to the French, made no attempt to pursue.

After Marshal Soult's French army had retreated from Portugal, General Wellesley's 20,000 British troops advanced into Spain to join 33,000 Spanish troops under General Cuesta. They marched up the Tagus valley to Talavera, some 120 kilometres (75 mi) southwest of Madrid. There they encountered 46,000 French in the corps of Marshal Claude Victor and Major-General Horace Sébastiani, the cavalry reserve, and the Madrid garrison; with the French king of Spain, Joseph Bonaparte in nominal command and Marshal Jean-Baptiste Jourdan in actual command.

The French crossed the Alberche in the middle of the afternoon on 27 July. A few hours later, the French attacked the right of the Spaniards and the British left. Both wings were driven back from the initial positions. A strategic hill was then taken and lost, until, finally, the British held it firmly. At daybreak on 28 July, the French attacked the British left again to retake the hill and were repulsed when the 29th Foot and 48th Foot who had been lying behind the crest stood up and carried out a bayonet charge. A French cannonade lasted until noon, when a negotiated armistice of two hours began. That afternoon, a heavy exchange of cannon fire started ahead of various infantry and cavalry skirmishes with mixed results. Early in the evening, a major engagement resulted in the French being held off. A cannon duel continued until dark. At daylight, the British and Spanish discovered that the bulk of the French force had retired, leaving their wounded and two brigades of artillery in the field. Wellesley was ennobled as Viscount Wellington of Talavera and of Wellington for the action.

== Background ==
The Spanish campaign in late 1809 started with the battle of Talavera.

== Opposing armies ==
=== Allied Army ===
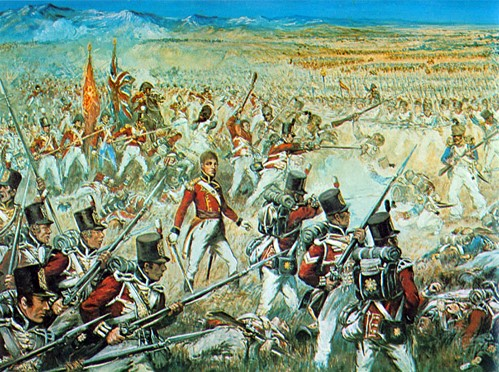
The 3rd Foot Guards at the battle of Talavera

Wellesley's British army consisted of four infantry divisions, three cavalry brigades and 30 cannon, totaling 20,641 troops. The infantry included the 1st Division under John Coape Sherbrooke (6,000), the 2nd Division led by Rowland Hill (3,900), the 3rd Division commanded by Alexander Mackenzie (3,700) and the 4th Division (3,000) under Alexander Campbell. Henry Fane led a brigade of heavy cavalry (1,100), while Stapleton Cotton (1,000) and George Anson (900) commanded light cavalry brigades. There were three British (RA: Lawson's Company, Sillery's Company, Elliot's Company) and two KGL batteries (Rettberg, Heise) with six guns apiece.

Cuesta's Spanish army of 35,000 was organized into five infantry and two cavalry divisions, plus about 30 artillery pieces, some 12 lb guns. The 28,000 infantry were in Zayas y Chacón's 1st Division (7 battalions) and Zayas y Potau's Vanguard (5 battalions), Iglesias's 2nd Division (8 battalions), Portago's 3rd Division (6 battalions), Manglano's 4th Division (8 battalions) and Bassecourt's 5th Division (7 battalions). Henestrosa and the Duke of Alburquerque led the 6,000 horsemen of the 1st and 2nd cavalry divisions and there were 800 artillerymen.

=== French Army ===
While Joseph nominally led the French Army, his military adviser Marshal Jean-Baptiste Jourdan actually exercised command over their 37,700 infantry and artillerymen, 8,400 cavalry and about 80 cannon.

Victor's I Corps included the infantry divisions of François Amable Ruffin (5,300), Pierre Belon Lapisse (6,900) and Eugene-Casimir Villatte (6,100), plus Louis-Chrétien Carrière, Baron de Beaumont's 1,000-man light cavalry brigade.

Sébastiani's IV Corps consisted of his own infantry division (8,100), Jean-Baptiste Cyrus de Valence's Poles (1,600) and Jean François Leval with his German-Dutch division (4,500). Christophe Antoine Merlin led the IV Corps light cavalry brigade (1,200).

Marie Victor de Fay, marquis de Latour-Maubourg (3,300) and Édouard Jean Baptiste Milhaud (2,350) commanded the two heavy dragoon divisions of the Cavalry Reserve.

The Madrid Garrison included part of Jean-Joseph, Marquis Dessolles's division (3,300), the King's Spanish Foot Guards (1,800) and two regiments of cavalry (700).

== Battle ==
=== Actions on the 27th ===
On 27 July, Wellesley sent out the 3rd Division and some cavalry under the command of George Anson to cover Cuesta's retreat into the Talavera position. But when Anson's cavalry mistakenly pulled back, the French rushed in to surprise and inflict over 400 casualties on Rufane Donkin's brigade, forcing them to fall back. That night, Victor sent Ruffin's division to seize the hill known as Cerro de Medellín in a coup de main. Two of Ruffin's three regiments went astray in the dark, but the 9th Light Infantry routed Sigismund von Löw's King's German Legion (KGL) brigade (1st Division) and pushed forward to capture the high ground. Alertly, Hill sent Richard Stewart's brigade (2nd Division) on a counter-attack which drove the French away. The British suffered some 800 casualties on the 27th.

During the evening of 27th, French dragoon squadrons were riding close to the Spanish position firing their carbines at Spanish skirmishers. Suddenly, without orders, Cuesta's entire Spanish line fired a thunderous volley at the French dragoons. The French were outside the range of the Spanish muskets, and little harm was done to them. Four Spanish battalions threw down their weapons and fled in panic. Wellesley wrote, "Nearly 2,000 ran off on the evening of the 27th...(not 100 yards from where I was standing) who were neither attacked, nor threatened with an attack, and who were frightened by the noise of their own fire; they left their arms and accoutrements on the ground, their officers went with them, and they... plundered the baggage of the British army which had been sent to the rear." While a majority of the panicked troops were brought back, many hundreds continued to flee, taking some rear echelon British with them.

=== Positions on the 28th ===
In the morning, it could be seen that the bulk of Cuesta's army held the right while the British formed the left. The Spanish right was anchored on the city of Talavera on the Tagus River and followed the course of the Portina stream. In the centre the British had built a redoubt, which was backed by the 4th Division and in which they placed a battery of four 3lb light cannons. Further to the left, the Medellín hill was held by the 1st Division, with the 2nd Division to its left. The 3rd Division plus Fane's and Cotton's cavalry formed the reserve. On the far left, Bassecourt's Spanish division was positioned on some high ground near the Sierra de Segurilla. Anson's brigade covered the valley between the Medellín and the Segurilla, supported by Alburquerque's Spanish horsemen.

Joseph and Jourdan massed Victor's I Corps on the French right, holding the hill of Cerro de Cascajal. Sébastiani's corps held the centre, while Latour-Maubourg and the Madrid garrison stood in reserve. On the French left, Milhaud's horsemen faced almost the entire Spanish army. Opposite the Medellín, the Cascajal bristled with 30 French cannon.

=== Actions on the 28th ===
Victor urged his superiors for a massive attack, but Joseph and Jourdan chose to peck away at the Anglo-Spanish position. At dawn, the guns on the Cascajal opened up, causing some loss among the British infantry formed in the open. Having learned the hard way about the destructive power of French artillery, Wellesley soon pulled his soldiers back into cover.

Again, Ruffin's division attacked the Medellín. Each battalion was formed in a column of divisions with a width of two companies and a depth of three. (French battalions had recently been re-organized into six companies.) Each regiment's three battalions advanced side by side with only a small gap between units. This would make each regimental attack roughly 160 files across and nine ranks deep. When Ruffin's men got within effective range, the British emerged from cover in two-deep lines to overlap the French columns. Riddled by fire from front and flank, and with their rear six ranks unable to fire, the French columns broke and ran.

Victor shifted Ruffin's survivors to the right against the Segurilla and supported them with one of Villatte's brigades. Lapisse, Sébastiani and Leval (from right to left) then launched a frontal attack against the British 1st and 4th Divisions. Alexander Campbell's men and the Spanish (notably the Cavalry Regiment El Rey) met Leval's attack, which went in first. Lapisse and Sébastiani then advanced in two lines using the same regimental columns that Ruffin had employed. Henry Campbell's Guards brigade (1st Division) routed the French regiments opposite them, then charged in pursuit, running into the French second line and intense artillery fire. The Guards and the Germans with them were routed in their turn, losing 500 men, including Major General Heinrich von Porbeck, and carried away Cameron's brigade with them. Seeing Guards and his centre broken, Wellesley personally brought up the 48th Foot to plug the hole caused by the dispersal of Sherbrooke's division. Backed by Mackenzie's brigade (3rd Division), the 48th broke the French second line's attack as the Guards rallied in the rear. Lapisse was mortally wounded. The 24th regiment of foot also took part in covering the guards and lost many men that they were only able to form 1 rank but did not receive any credits for this action after the battle because the message containing the order was lost.

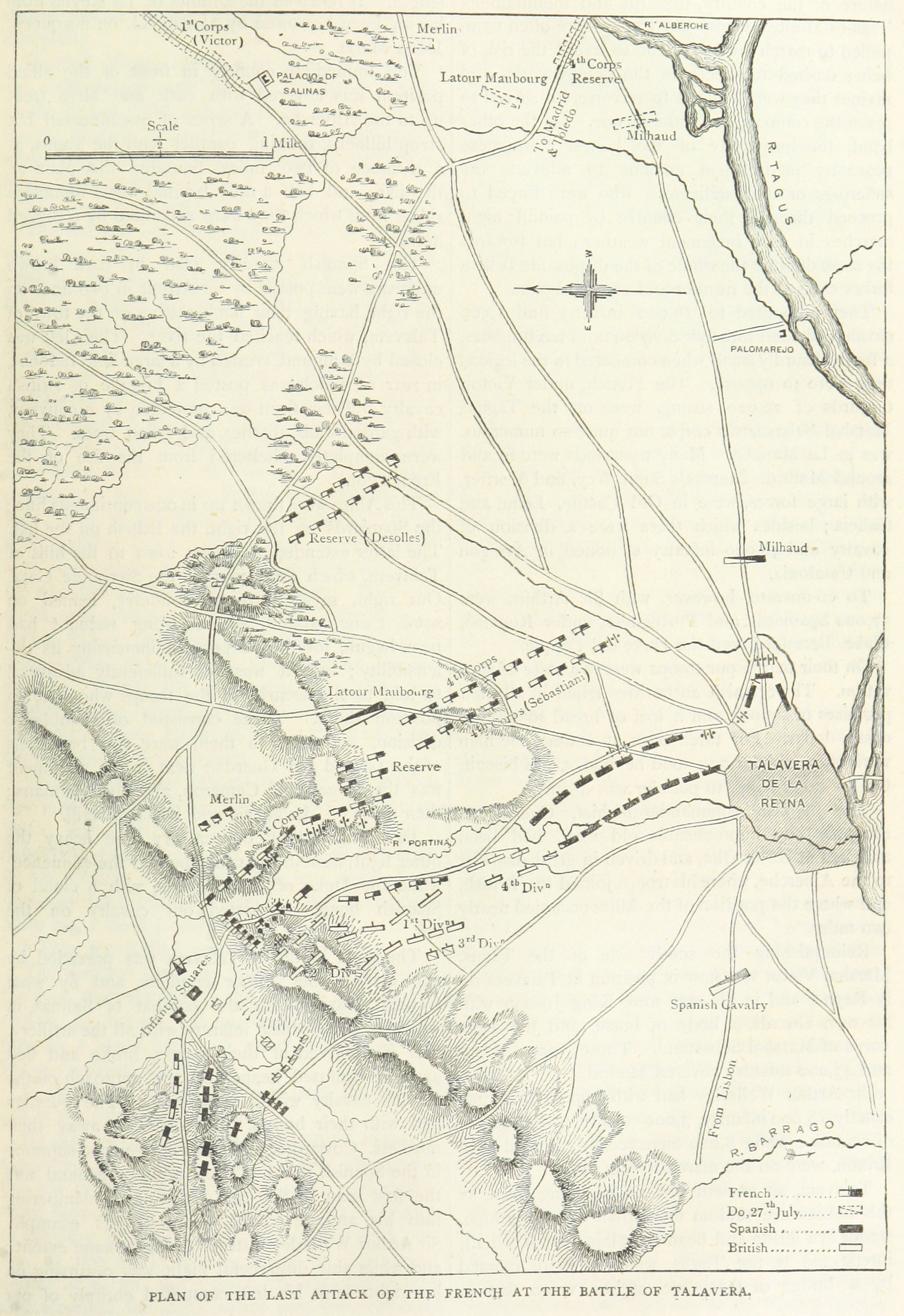
A map of the final French attack

The main French attack having been defeated, Victor pushed Ruffin's men into the valley between the Medellín and the Segurilla. Anson's cavalry brigade was ordered to drive them back. While the 1st KGL Hussars advanced at a controlled pace, the 23rd Light Dragoons soon broke into a wild gallop. The undisciplined unit ran into a hidden ravine, hobbling many horses. Those horsemen who cleared the obstacle were easily fended off by the French infantry, formed into squares. The 23rd Light Dragoons charged past the squares and ploughed into Beaumont's cavalry, drawn up behind Ruffin. The British dragoons lost 102 killed and wounded and another 105 captured before they cut their way out. After the battle, the mauled regiment had to be sent back to England to refit. However, this ended the French attacks for the day. Joseph and Jourdan failed to employ their reserve, for which they were bitterly criticized by Napoleon.

== Aftermath ==
The Spanish campaign in late 1809 proceeded with the Talavera campaign in the Battle of Almonacid.

=== Aftermath of the Battle of Talavera ===
The battle had an ambiguous outcome from a tactical standpoint. On the one hand, the French army indeed failed to force the Coalition army to flee the battlefield, the Coalition remained intact when the final of the French attacks on the 28th was repulsed, and the French army ultimately left the field, though of their own volition rather than under pressure from the enemy army. On the other hand, the French army also remained intact and the Coalition failed to gain the upper hand in several of the tactical engagements at Talavera between 27 and 28 July, such as the final attack of the 23rd Dragoon, the defeat and retreat of Donkin, the KGL, and the Spaniards on the 27th, and the disastrous counterattack by the Guards. Joseph knew that Soult was advancing on Wellesley and Cuesta's rear; thus from a strategic standpoint, the decision to withdraw toward Madrid and lure Wellesley deeper was advantageous for Joseph, adding to this the fact that his frontal attacks, while unsuccessful, had not broken his army's combat ability. Still, dispatches intercepted by Spanish guerrillas revealed the French plans to Wellesley, and he retreated unshattered back to Portugal. The condition of Soult's corps following the Second Battle of Porto was dire (lacking artillery, weapons, and equipment) which caused a significant delay in his efforts to encircle Wellesley and Cuesta. The French opportunity of destroying the only British army in the peninsula was missed.

The French, in this hard-fought set-piece battle, lost 7,389, inclusive of "men and officers." Of these, approx. 4,000 were from Victor's 19,300-strong corps alone. In total: 944 killed, including 2 generals, 6,294 wounded, 156 prisoners and 17 guns captured; thus, 7,394 men. As per one count, the Allies lost fewer: 6,553; as if following another assessment, then more, namely 7,468. The Spanish casualties were between 'several hundred' and 1,200 killed or wounded, "but the correctness of the report was very much doubted at the time." British casualties were from 5,363 to 6,268 (while up to 5,422 of them were on the 28th), including 800 killed, over the two days of fighting, from 3,913 (Note: "generals, officers, sergeants, privates") to 3,915 (Note: "officers, men") wounded and from 647 (Note: officers, men) to 652 (Note: officers, sergeants, soldiers) missing. This was approximately 25% of the British force, compared to only 18% of the French, although it is clear that the brunt of the French attack fell on the British. Many of the wounded on both sides were burnt to death when the dry grass of the battlefield caught fire, as Lieutenant-General John Elley wrote to his sister:

"[...] the ground on which the battle was fought was clothed with corn, long grass and heath. The fire of the artillery was excessive and set fire to the corn and grass, the consequence was a number of the wounded were literally roasted alive. The enemy abandoned great numbers of their wounded, which together with our own we have been collecting [...]"

The next day (29th), the 3,000 infantry of the Light Division reinforced the British army after completing a famous march of 42 miles (68 km) in 26 hours.

=== Aftermath of the Talavera campaign ===
While the Battle of Talavera was fought, Marshal Soult advanced south, threatening to cut Wellesley off from Portugal. Thinking that the French force was only 15,000 strong, Wellesley moved east on 3 August to block it, leaving 1,500 wounded in the care of the Spanish. Spanish guerillas captured a message from Soult to Joseph that Soult had 30,000 men and brought it to Wellesley. The British commander, realising his line of retreat was about to be cut by a larger French force, sent the Light Brigade on a mad dash for the bridge over the Tagus River at Almaraz. The light infantry reached there on 6 August, just ahead of Soult. By 20 August, all British forces had withdrawn across the mountains and for the next six months, until 27 February 1810, Wellesley's forces took no part in the hard fighting in southern Spain and along the Portuguese border, despite numerous invitations from the Spanish. The Spanish had also promised food to the British if they advanced back into Spain, but Wellington, with an army incapable of living off the land like the French and without its own transport, did not trust his ally to provide these essentials and made general excuses blaming the Spanish for various deficiencies of their government and army. In the event of the retreat the British abandoned nearly all of their baggage and ammunition as well as the artillery captured from the French at Talavera.

The Spanish made another attempt to take Madrid, with Wellesley still refusing to participate, and they were ultimately badly defeated at the battle of Ocaña in November 1809.

Historian Charles Oman, in volume II of A History of the Peninsular War, calls the Talavera campaign a failure for the Anglo-Spanish allies, placing the blame on various Spanish errors while dismissing much of the criticism of Wellesley and the British, suggesting there was no reason to imagine a concentration of the French forces opposing them. Oman also attributes some of the failure to Wellesley's ignorance of the conditions in Spain at the time. At the start of the campaign Wellington had received the promised provisions while both the French and the Spanish were suffering severe shortages of food. He complained more about the failure of the Spanish to provide transport for the provisions than food attributing this to maliciousness on the part of the Spanish, apparently unaware that there was no transport to be had for any army in that area.

After this battle Wellesley was created Viscount Wellington of Talavera.

== Popular culture ==
The same year Irish politician and writer John Wilson Croker's poem The Battles of Talavera was published. A popular success, running through several editions, it played a major role in romanticising the Peninsular War.

Talavera is the setting for Sharpe's Eagle, the first book written in Bernard Cornwell's "Sharpe" series, and is depicted in the conclusion of the film adaptation of the same name. The flanking manoeuvre by the Light Company is completely fictional as is the South Essex regiment they are attached to. Cavalry is notably absent from the battle, with the hidden ditch used by Sharpe and his men for cover instead.

The Battle of Talavera is referenced frequently throughout Eugene O'Neill's 1942 play A Touch of the Poet.

The Monument to the Battle of Talavera, a war memorial located in Talavera de la Reina, was inaugurated on 2 October 1990.

== Notes ==
Preceded by Armistice of Znaim	Napoleonic Wars; Battle of Talavera	Succeeded by Walcheren Campaign
