= Luis de Lacy =

Spanish general (1775–1817)

Brigadier-General Luis Roberto de Lacy y Gautier
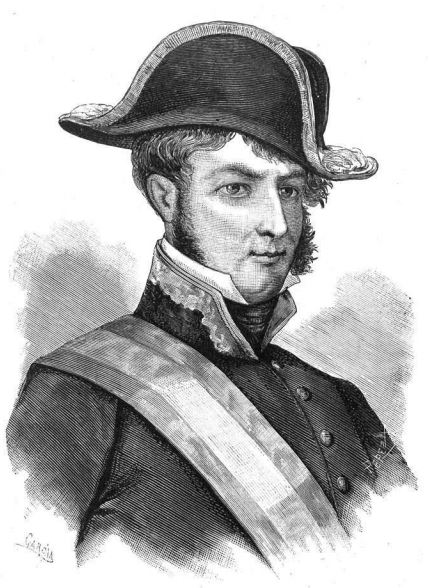
- Posthumous lithography, 1881
- Born: 11 January 1775; San Roque, Cádiz,
- Died: 5 July 1817 (aged 42) Bellver Castle, Palma, Majorca
- Buried: Cementiri de Sant Andreu, Barcelona
- Allegiance: Bourbon Spain 1789 to 1803; France 1803–1808; Kingdom of Spain
- Service years: 1789–1817
- Rank: Brigadier-General
- Commands: Capitán-General; Catalonia, 1811–1812; Galicia, 1813–1814
- Conflicts: American Revolutionary War; War of the Pyrenees; War of the Third Coalition; Invasion of Portugal; Peninsular War; Battle of Ocana; Battle of Barrosa

Brigadier-General Luis Roberto de Lacy (11 January 1775 – 5 July 1817) was a Spanish professional soldier of Irish descent, who served in the Spanish and French Imperial armies.

He played a prominent role in the 1808 to 1814 Spanish War of Independence and held a number of senior military positions but was executed in 1817 for leading a failed revolt against the government of Ferdinand VII. In 1820, the Cortes or Spanish Parliament, declared him a hero of Spanish democracy and installed a plaque to his memory in the Palacio de las Cortes, Madrid, where it remains.

== Background ==
Luis Roberto de Lacy was born 11 January 1775, in San Roque, Cádiz, to Lieutenant-Colonel Patrick de Lacy, an officer in the Ultonia, or Ulster, Regiment, a foreign unit or Infantería de línea extranjera of the Spanish army. Patrick died sometime before 1785, and his wife Antonia remarried Jean Gautier, another Ultonia officer.

His grandfather, General Patrick de Lacy y Gould (1678-?), came from Limerick; along with many relatives, he was part of the post-1691 Irish diaspora known as the Flight of the Wild Geese. His brother, Peter (1678–1751), was a general in the Imperial Russian Army, whose son, Count Franz Moritz von Lacy (1725–1801), became an Austrian Fieldmarshall. Patrick himself settled in Barcelona and commanded the Ultonia during the 1701 to 1714 War of the Spanish Succession.

De Lacy's uncle, Francis Anthony de Lacy (1731–1792), commanded Spanish forces in the 1779 to 1783 Great Siege of Gibraltar and later served as envoy to Sweden and Russia. He was created a Knight of the order of Carlos Tecera and appointed Capitán-General of Catalonia in 1789. An aunt married George Browne, another Irish exile who was Governor-General of Livonia, Russia.

While serving with the Imperial French army, de Lacy was based in Quimper, Brittany, where he met Emilia du Guermeur. Her Royalist family disapproved of her relationship with an officer in Napoleon's army but she accompanied de Lacy when his unit was posted to Holland. They apparently had a child but his wife disappears from the record after 1807.

== Service with the Royal Spanish Army; 1785 to 1803 ==
De Lacy was commissioned into the Ultonia regiment when he was 10, although his age was recorded as 13 to satisfy minimum requirements. Issuing commissions to children was not unusual, as they were considered private investments and often used to provide pensions for orphans. Although by now the Ultonia was no longer 'Irish', many of the officers were Spanish-born descendants of the original Irish emigrants, including his uncle Francis and various cousins.

In 1789, de Lacy joined an expedition to Puerto Rico, accompanied by his stepfather. They apparently quarrelled and on their return, de Lacy walked to Porto, in Portugal, intending to take ship to the Moluccas, before his stepfather brought him home.

Promoted captain, he took part in the War of the Pyrenees against France, which ended with the April 1795 Peace of Basel. He was posted to the Canary Islands in 1799, where he fought a duel with the local Capitán-General. Despite being transferred to El Hierro, he continued their feud; he was court-martialed as a result and sentenced to one year in the Royal Prison at the Concepción Arsenal at Cádiz.

== Service with the Imperial Army; 1803 to 1808 ==
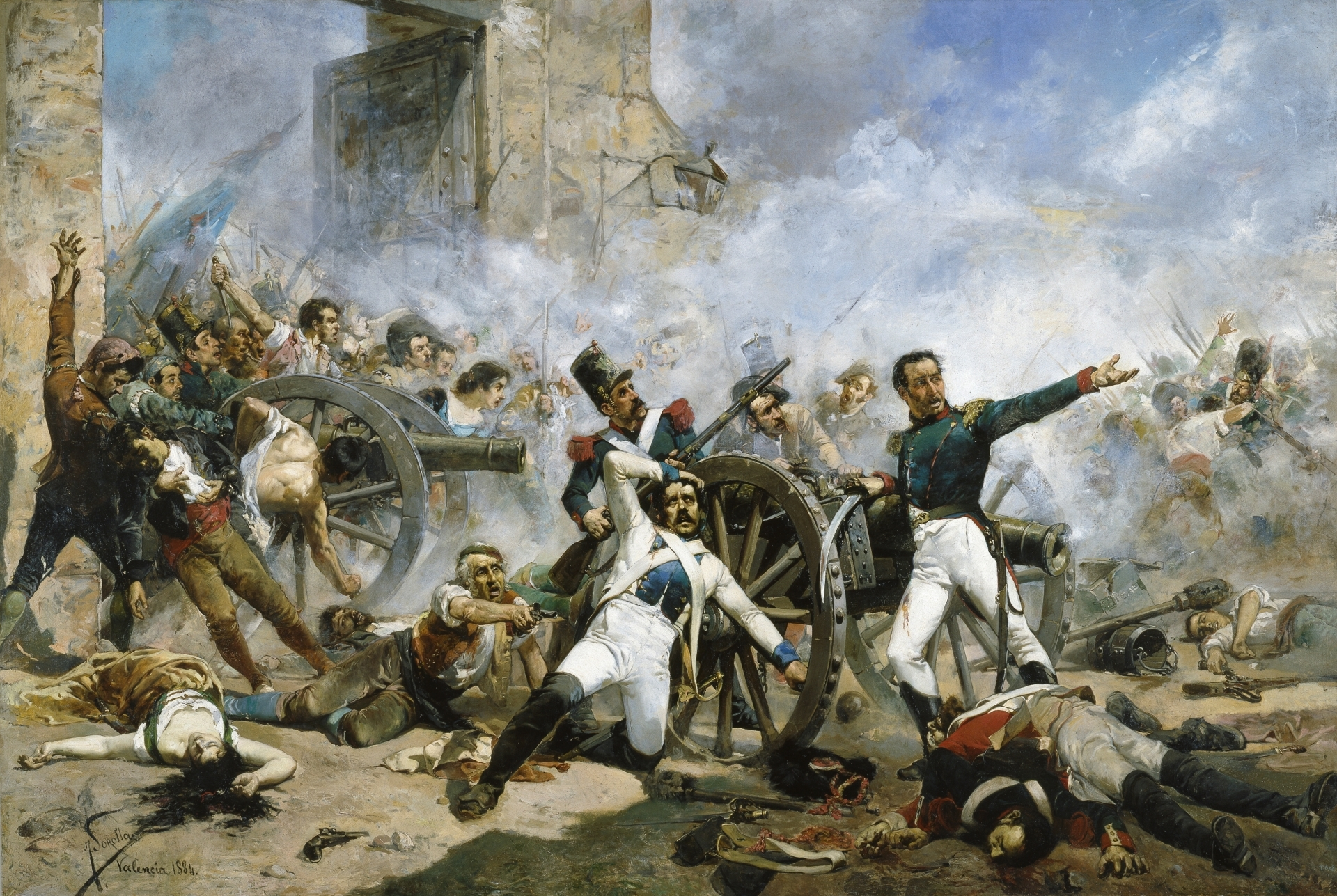
The removal of Ferdinand in 1808 led to the revolt known as the Dos de Mayo Uprising

His jailers allegedly considered him mentally unbalanced; as a result, De Lacy was stripped of his commission, and barred from re-enlisting in the Spanish army. He moved to France in order to continue his career and was appointed captain in the Irish Legion, a French army unit formed in Brittany and intended to support an Irish rising. Although many of its officers were Irish exiles or of Irish descent, like De Lacy, the rank and file were mostly Polish.

When the proposed rebellion failed to materialise, the Legion was posted to the Netherlands, where it remained until the War of the Third Coalition ended in 1806. De Lacy was appointed commandant of the second battalion, which participated in the 1807 invasion of Portugal. In March 1808, Charles IV of Spain abdicated in favour of his son, Ferdinand, who was replaced in May by Joseph Bonaparte and held in France.

De Lacy arrived in Madrid shortly before the May 1808 revolt known as the Dos de Mayo; he deserted, and was reinstated in the Spanish army as colonel of the Burgos regiment.

== Service with the Spanish Army; 1808–1814 ==
In July 1809, de Lacy was given command of the Isla de León, an important defensive position in Cádiz, home of the Regency Council that ruled Spain in Ferdinand's absence. He led the 1st Division at the Battle of Ocana on 19 November 1809; the collapse of the Spanish cavalry under Manuel Freire de Andrade exposed him to a flank attack that practically annihilated his division. A second defeat at Alba de Tormes on 29 November left the Spanish unable to confront the French in open battle and they resorted to guerrilla tactics.

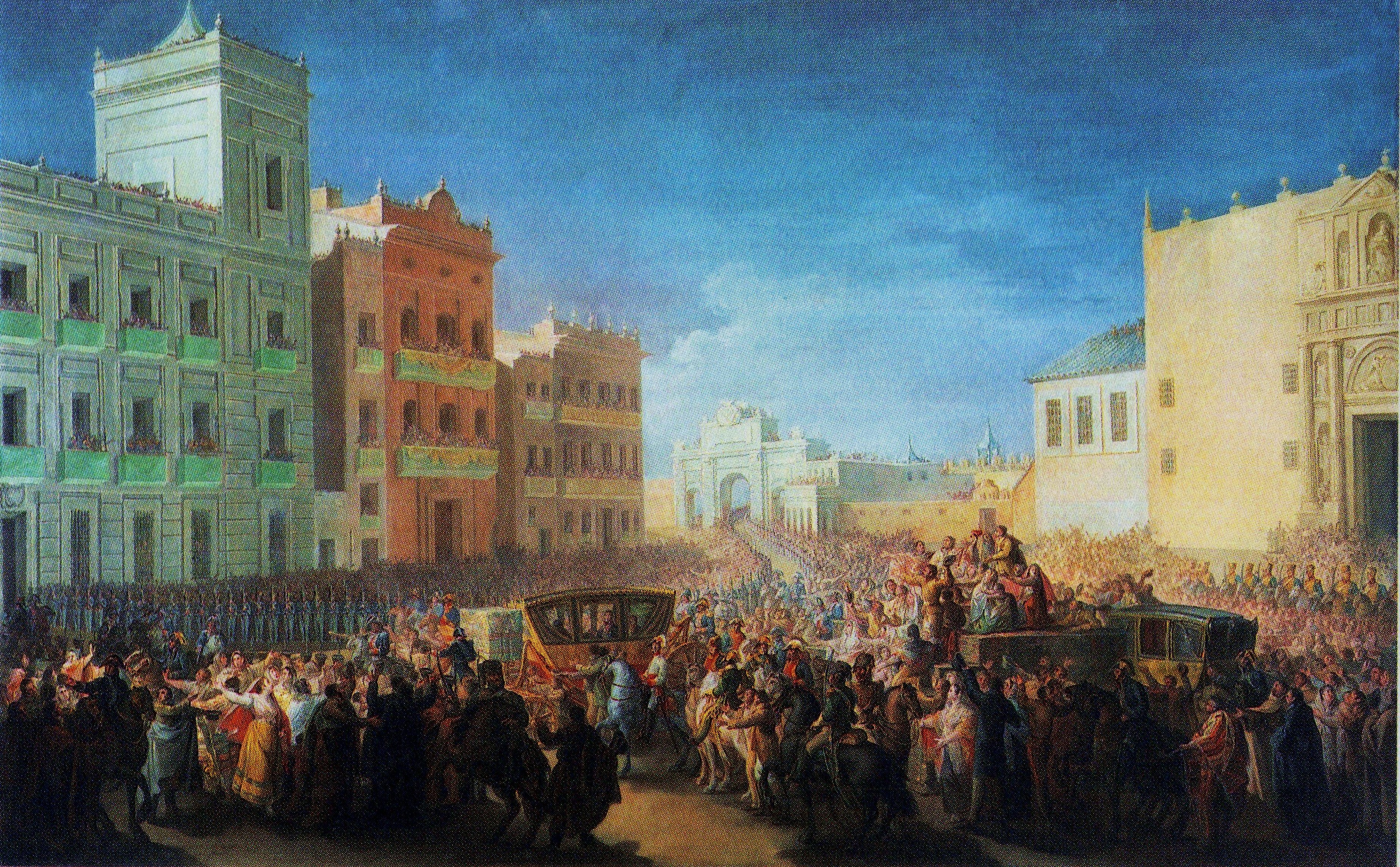
Celebrations as Ferdinand enters Valencia in 1815; his rejection of the 1812 Constitution led to a series of revolts, including that led by de Lacy in 1817

Although Cádiz was besieged by the French from February 1810 to August 1812, support from the Royal Navy allowed the Council to send small amphibious expeditions intended to bolster resistance elsewhere. De Lacy led landings in Algeciras, Ronda, Marbella and Huelva and although unable to hold them, this absorbed French resources. In March 1811, de Lacy's troops supported an Anglo-Spanish attempt to break the siege of Cádiz; the resulting Battle of Barrosa was a significant victory, although command failures meant the siege continued.

After the loss of Tarragona in June 1811, de Lacy replaced the Marquess of Campoverde as Capitán-General of Catalonia, a position held by his uncle Francis from 1789 to 1792. French efforts to capture Valencia weakened them elsewhere and provided the Spanish opportunities for partisan warfare. De Lacy led a series of incursions into the French departments of Haute-Garonne and Ariège; these restored local morale and forced the French to send reinforcements.

Most major towns, including Barcelona, Tarragona and Lleida, remained in French hands and in early 1812, Napoleon made Catalonia part of France. The focus on guerrilla tactics led to an increasingly bitter war of reprisals and executions by both sides, which severely impacted the civilian population. Many of the partisan bands were beyond central control and their operations often indistinguishable from simple brigandage. This led to conflict between de Lacy and local Catalan leaders and in January 1813, he moved to Santiago de Compostela as Captain General of the Kingdom of Galicia. He assumed command of the Reserva de Galicia, which he focused on disciplining and reorganising. Following Allied victory at Vitoria in June 1813, the French withdrew from Spain and Ferdinand returned to Madrid in April 1814.

== Execution and rehabilitation ==
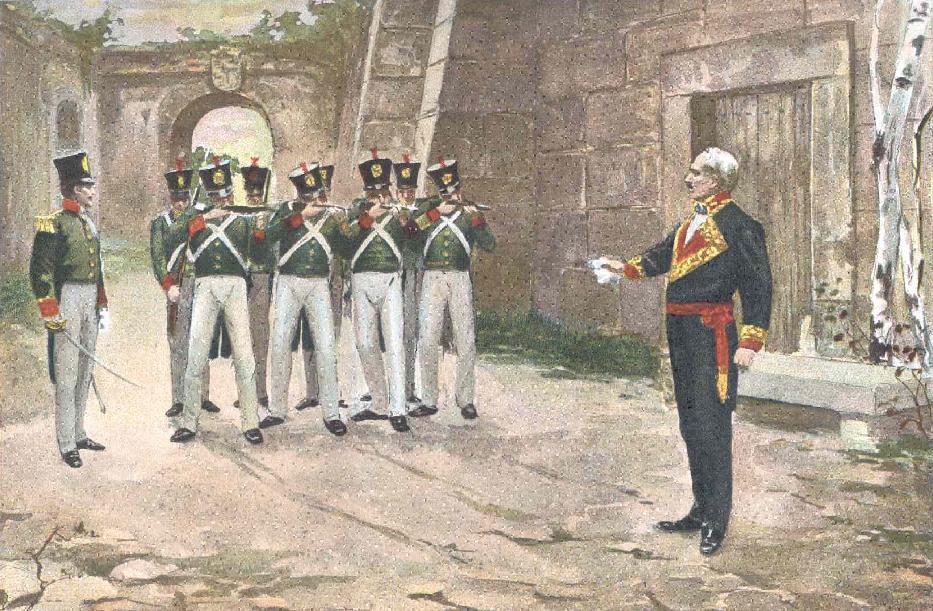
Execution of Luis Roberto de Lacy y Gautier, 5 July 1817

Ferdinand rejected a previous commitment to accept the Spanish Constitution of 1812 and established an absolutist regime; Spain also faced colonial wars in the Americas, which began in 1810 and continued until 1833. This destabilised the regime and led to a series of attempted coups, by military officers like de Lacy backed by progressive civilian elements, often linked by Freemasonry.

Following failed attempts in 1815 and 1816, de Lacy returned to Barcelona and assisted by a former subordinate, Francisco Milans del Bosch, planned another. This began on 5 April 1817 but quickly collapsed; de Lacy was captured, court-martialed, and sentenced to death. Following public protests against the sentence, he was secretly taken to Palma, Majorca, held at Bellver Castle and executed there by firing squad on 5 July 1817.

In 1820, a revolt led by Colonel Rafael del Riego forced Ferdinand to restore the 1812 Constitution; this began the Trienio Liberal, a period of liberalisation that ended in 1823, when a French army allowed Ferdinand to re-assert control. However, in 1820 the reconstituted Cortes Generales declared de Lacy a martyr; along with others including Riego, he is commemorated on a plaque in the Palacio de las Cortes, Madrid, which can still be seen today. De Lacy was buried at the Cementiri de Sant Andreu, in Barcelona. The Calle General Lacy in Atocha, Madrid, is named after him.

== Sources ==
- Alexander, Don W (1977). "France's Neglected Frontier; Pyrenees Operations in the Peninsular War". Military Review. LVII.
- Carr, Raymond (1982). Spain; A History (2000 ed.). Oxford University Press. ISBN 978-0198206194.
- Clark, Brian; Thompson, F. Glenn (1976). "Napoleon's Irish Legion, 1803-15: The Historical Record". Military History Society of Ireland. 12 (48).
- De Lacy-Bellingari, Edward (1928). The roll of the house of Lacy: pedigrees, military memoirs and synoptical history of the ancient and illustrious family of De Lacy, from the earliest times, in all its branches, to the present day; Volume VIII. Waverly Press.
- Gates, David (2002). The Spanish Ulcer: A History of the Peninsular War. London: Pimlico. ISBN 0-7126-9730-6.
- Grehan, John; Mace, Martin (2013). The Battle of Barrosa, 1811: Forgotten Battle of the Peninsular War. Pen & Sword Military. ISBN 978-1848848269.
- Lacey, Gerard (1994). The Legacy of the de Lacy, Lacey, Lacy Family, 1066-1994. Mashue Publishing.
- Lawrence, Mark (2014). Spain's First Carlist War, 1833-40. Palgrave Macmillan. ISBN 978-1137401748.
- MacBride, Patrick (1936). "General Luis De Lacy in the Spanish Service". Studies: An Irish Quarterly Review. 25 (10).
- Maunsell, Robert George (1903). History of Maunsell or Mansel, and of Crayford, Gabbett, Knoyle, Persse, Toler, Waller, Castletown; Waller, Prior Park; Warren, White, Winthrop, and Mansell of Guernsey. Cork, Guy and Company, Limited.
