= Navalmoral =

- municipality
- Flag Coat of arms

- Location in Spain. Navalmoral (Spain)
- Coordinates: 40°27′35″N 4°46′07″W
- Country: Spain
- Autonomous community: Castile and León
- Province: Ávila
- Municipality: Navalmoral

Area
  - Total: 43 km^{2} (17 sq mi)

Population (2025-01-01)
  - Total: 445
  - Density: 10/km^{2} (27/sq mi)
- Time zone: UTC+1 (CET)
  - Summer (DST): UTC+2 (CEST)
- Website: Official website

Navalmoral is a municipality located in the province of Ávila, Castile and León, Spain.

== Population ==
Historical population
Year	Pop.	±% p.a.
2023	364	—
2024	412	+13.19%
2025	445	+8.01%
Source: INE
