= Battle of Ocaña =

1809 battle of the Peninsular War

- Part of the Peninsular War
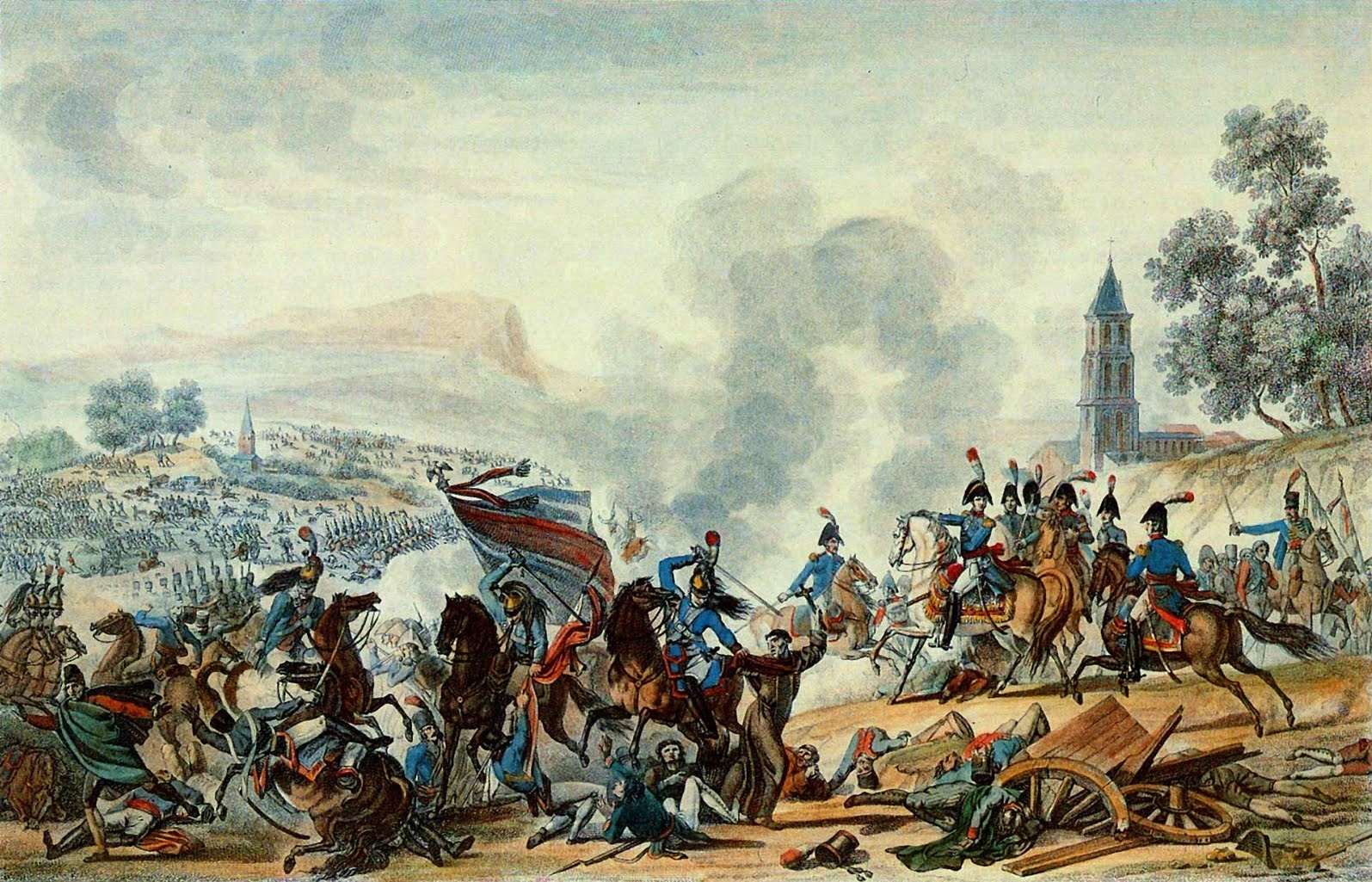
- Engraving of the battle after an Adolphe Roehn painting
Date	19 November 1809
Location	Near Ocaña, Spain 39°57′N 3°30′W
Result	French victory

Belligerents
France	Spain

Commanders and leaders
(France) Joseph Bonaparte (France) Jean-de-Dieu Soult (Note: The actual supreme commander. Joseph — a formal leader.)	(Spain) Juan Carlos Aréizaga

Strength
24,000–27,000 infantry 5,000–6,000 cavalry 50 guns	44,000–45,000 infantry 6,000–7,000 cavalry 60 guns

Casualties and losses
1,700–2,000 killed or wounded	4,000–5,000 killed or wounded 14,000–26,000 captured 45 guns captured

Peninsular War: Castile & Andalusia
current battle

The Battle of Ocaña was fought on 19 November 1809 between French forces under Marshal Jean-de-Dieu Soult against the Spanish army under General Juan Carlos Aréizaga, which suffered its greatest single defeat in the Peninsular War.

General Aréizaga's Spanish army of 51,000 troops lost nearly 19,000 men killed, wounded, prisoners and deserters, mostly due to the French use of their cavalry. Tactically, the battle was a Cannae-like encirclement of the Spanish army, and the worst defeat ever suffered by a Spanish army on home soil. The strategic consequences were also devastating, as it destroyed the only force capable of defending southern Spain.

== Background ==
The Spanish campaign in late 1809 started with the Battle of Talavera.

=== Maneuvers ===
The Spanish campaign in the autumn of 1809 called for their armies to lunge at Madrid from both north and south. They called for assistance from Arthur Wellesley, Viscount Wellington, but after experiencing a lack of cooperation from the Spanish during the Talavera campaign the British general refused. The French were nearly surprised by the southern thrust. By 9 November, the southern army was within 35 miles of Madrid with only 7,000 French troops blocking them. Then General Juan Carlos Aréizaga lost his nerve and halted for three days. He then pressed on toward Madrid but ran into two French divisions and pulled back. Several days of fruitless countermarching found the thoroughly alerted French concentrated and moving to intercept the Spanish army.

=== Spanish Army ===
Aréizaga commanded 51,000-52,000 men in eight infantry and four cavalry divisions, with 60 cannon manned by 1,500 artillerists. Other authorities give the Spanish 60,000 or 56,500 men

Spanish infantry

- 1st Division: Lacy (7,700)
  - 9 battalions of Burgos, Alcala, 1/Espana, 1/Loxa, 1/Seville, Provincial of Cordova, Prov. of Chinchilla.
- 2nd Division: Vigodet (7,100)
  - 9 bns. of Corona, Military Orders, Ronda, Alcazar, Ciudad Real, 1/Guadix.
- 3rd Division: Girón (5,200)
  - 8 bns. of 1/Guards, 2/Guards, 2/Cordova, Gailen, Prov. of Jaen, Prov. of Toledo.
- 4th Division: Castejon (6,400)
  - 8 bns. of 1/Malaga, 5/Seville, 2/Loxa, Bujalance, Xeres, 3/Cordova, Velez Malaga Cazadores.
- 5th Division: Zeraín (5,900)
  - 7 bns. of Barbastro Cazadores, 2/Espana, 2/Seville, 2/Madrid, Provincial of Granada, 3/Walloon Guards.
- 6th Division: N. Jacome (7,600)
  - 9 bns. of Badajoz, Jaen, Alpujarras, 4/Seville, Prov. of Malaga, Prov. of Ecija, Estremadura Tiradores.
- 7th Division: Francisco Copons (5,100)
  - 6 bns. of Murcia, Real Marina, Africa, Reyna Regts.
- Vanguard: Zayas (6,000)
  - 7 bns. Cantabria, Valencia Volunteers, 2/Majorca, Prov. of Plasencia, Prov. Grenadiers, Espana Vols.

Spanish cavalry
Freire de Andrade (5,800)

- 1st Division: J. Bernuy
  - Rey, Infante, Almanza, Estremadura Carabineers and Lancers, Madrid Vols.
- 2nd Division: J. Rivas
  - Pavia, 1st and 2nd Estremadura Hussars, Toledo Cazadores.
- 3rd Division: Miguel March
  - Montesa, Reyna, Santiago, Principe, Cordova, Alcantara.
- 4th Division: Osorio
  - Farnesio, Lusitania, Espana, Granada Cazadores, Fernanda VII Grenadiers.

=== French Army ===
King Joseph led the French army in name only. Actual command over the 24,000 infantry, 5,000 cavalry, 1,500 artillerists and 50 cannon was exercised by Marshal Soult. Two army corps, three cavalry divisions and the Central Reserve formed core of the army.

IV Corps Sébastiani

- Division: Leval
  - 2 battalions each of Dutch brigade, 2nd Nassau, Baden, Hesse-Darmstadt Erbprinz Regts., 1 bn. Frankfurt.
- Division: Werlé
  - 2 bns. each of 4th, 7th and 9th Poles.
- Five artillery batteries.
- Cavalry:
  - 3rd Dutch Hussar, Polish Vistula Lancer Regts.

V Corps Marshal Mortier

- Division: Girard
  - 3 bns. each of 17th Light, 40th, 64th, 88th Line. 4 bns. 34th Line.
- Division: Gazan
  - 3 bns. each of 21st and 28th Light, 100th and 103rd Line.
- Five artillery batteries.

Cavalry and Central Reserve

- Division: Milhaud (1,800)
  - 5th, 12th, 16th, 20th, 21st Dragoon Regiments.
- Division: Antoine Paris d'Illins † (1,000)
  - 10th and 26th Chasseur, Westphalian Light Horse Regts.
- Division: Charles Victor Woirgard (Beauregard) (1,500)
  - 10th Hussar, 21st Chasseur, 13th and 22nd Dragoon Regts.
- Royal Guard cavalry: (700)
  - King's Spanish Chasseur, 27th Chasseur Regts.
- Central Reserve: Jean-Joseph, Marquis Dessolles (7,000)
  - Royal Guard Brigade: 4 Guard battalions, 51st and 55th Line.
  - Brigade: Louis Emmanuel Rey: 12th Light, 43rd Line.

== Battle ==
=== Cavalry action ===
On 18 November, one of the largest cavalry actions of the Peninsular War took place. Three of Freire's divisions, 4,000 horsemen, attempted to clear a route of retreat for the Spanish army. The French deployed with Paris's light cavalry in the front line and Milhaud's dragoons in the second line. Paris charged, broke the Spanish first line, and was checked when Freire brought up his reserves. At this juncture, Milhaud's dragoons attacked and drove the Spanish cavalry from the field. The French lost less than 100 men, while Spanish losses were in the hundreds, with 80 captured.

William Napier writes of the cavalry action before the battle: "The Spaniards came on at a trot, and Sebastiani directed Paris, with a regiment of light cavalry and the Polish lancers, to turn and fall upon the right flank of the approaching squadrons, which being executed with great vigor, especially by the Poles, caused considerable confusion, which the Spanish general endeavored to remedy by closing to the assailed flank."

=== Positions ===
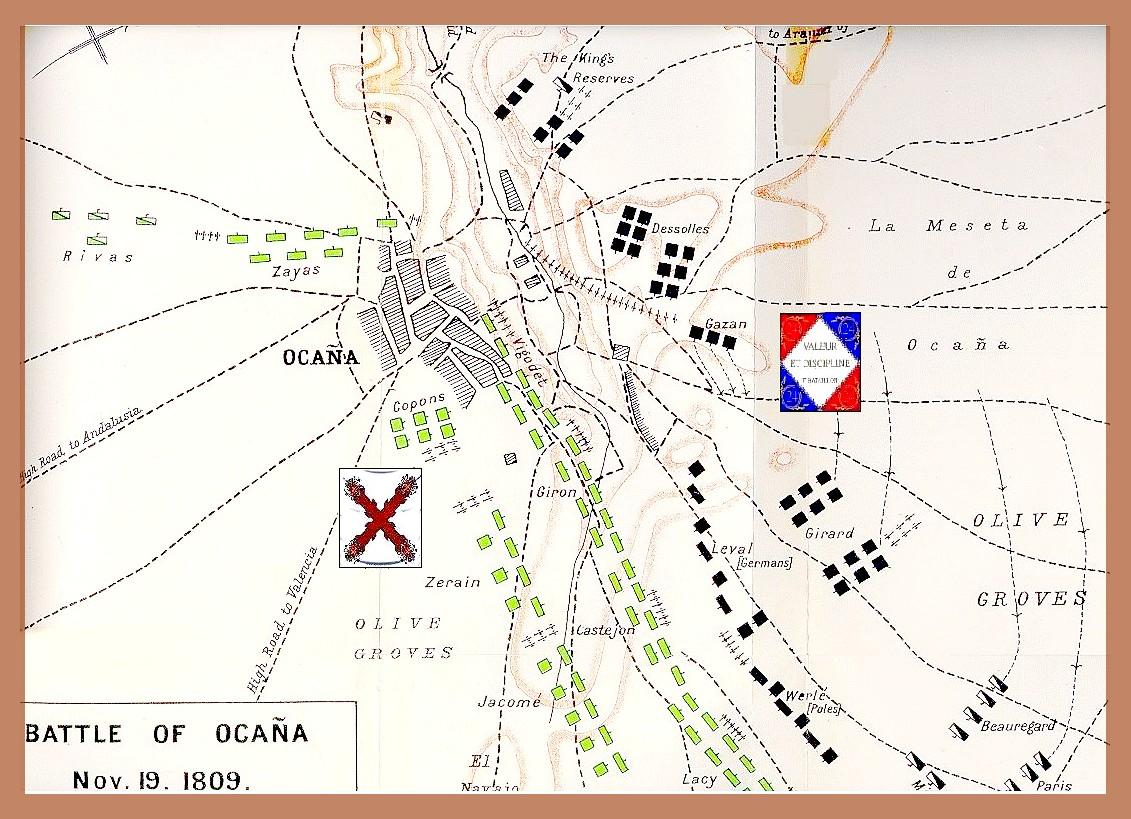
Plan of the Battle of Ocaña

West of Ocaña town, Aréizaga placed Zayas y Chacón's Vanguard and Rivas's cavalry. From Ocaña to the east, the Spanish commander aligned his center and right. The right flank, which hung in air, was held by Freire's remaining three cavalry divisions. From there to Ocaña, Lacy, Castejon, Girón and Vigodet held the front line. Their battalions were arranged in a double line. In reserve behind Castejon stood Jacome's men, Zerain supported Giron and Copons backed up Vigodet.

The Royal Guard and one brigade of Dessolles stood north of Ocaña, facing across a deep ravine. The next unit to the east was Louis Rey's brigade of Dessolles. Gazan and Girard of the V Corps, Leval and Werlé of IV Corps, and the cavalry completed the line to the east. Soult massed 30 cannons near Dessolles and the V Corps' positions.

=== Battle ===
On 19 November, the massed battery pounded the Spanish center as Leval attacked Castejon and Werlé went in against Lacy's division. At first the Spanish swung their line back. Then, as the IV Corps halted to wait for artillery to be brought up, the two Spanish divisions surged forward into musket range and opened fire. The Dutch, Germans and Poles began to edge rearward. Soult ordered up Girard's division to support the wavering IV Corps battalions.

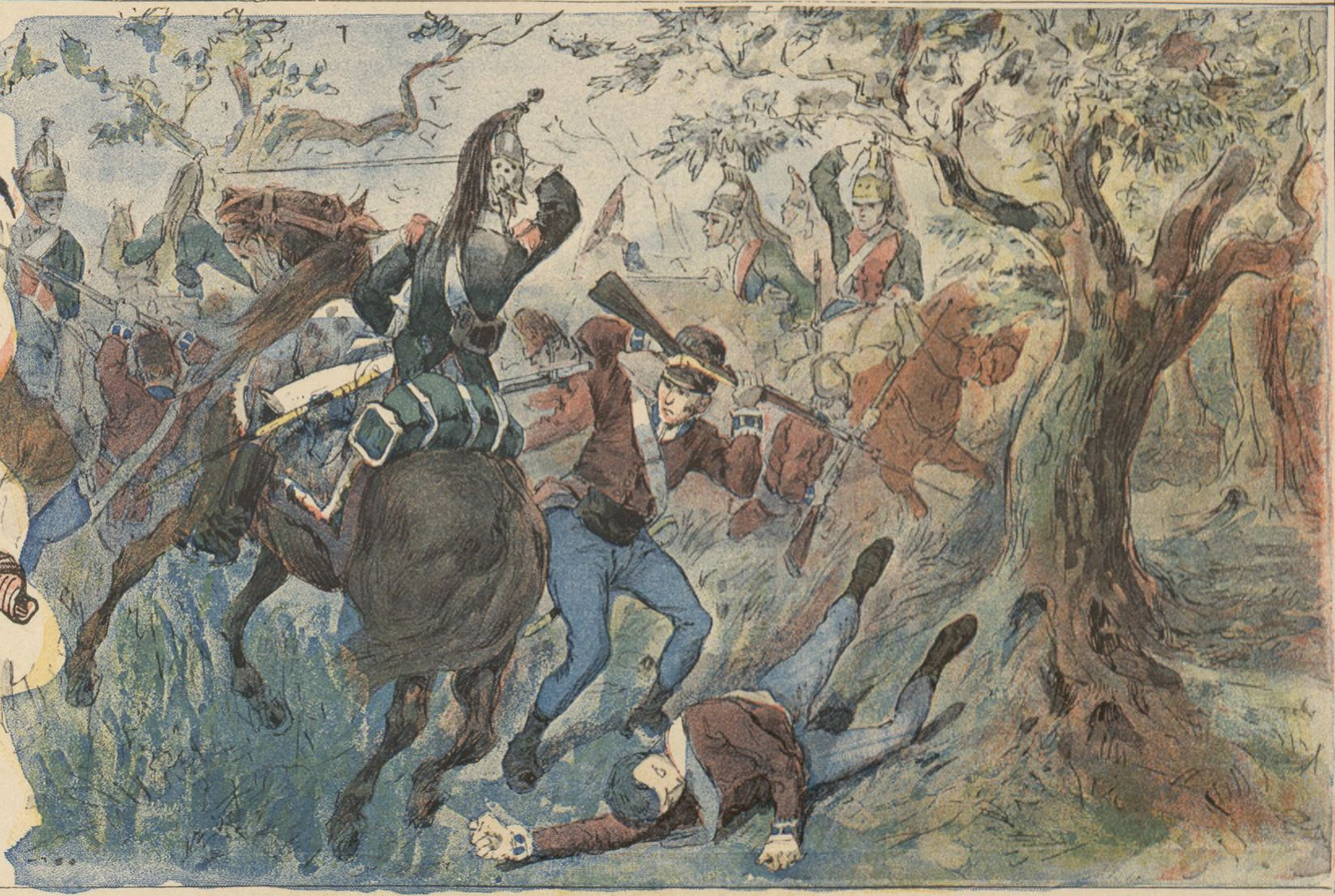
1892 illustration of Milhaud's 12th Dragoons charging the Spanish infantry

While this was going on, Milhaud's dragoons, supported by Woirgard and Paris, moved rapidly toward the vulnerable Spanish right flank. Screened by olive groves, they suddenly appeared in front of Freire's command. The French charged and soon routed the Spanish horsemen. Milhaud, Paris and Woirgard neatly wheeled their squadrons and tore into the unprotected flank of Lacy's infantry. Soult sent the French line forward. The massed battery savaged the Spanish line with renewed fury.

Faced by the threat of infantry pressing their front while cavalry slashed into their flank, the Spanish divisions collapsed one after another and bolted for the rear. At this crisis, Dessolles and the Royal Guard dashed across the ravine and burst into Ocaña, severing the Spanish left from their disintegrating center and right. As the Spanish army streamed away to the south, only Zayas's division remained intact to cover the retreat. Soult's cavalry pressed the pursuit and broke Zayas later in the day.

=== Results ===
The French captured 14,000 Spaniards, 50 cannon, 30 flags and the entire baggage train. Another 4,000 were killed and wounded. French losses were 2,000 killed and wounded. Paris was killed and Girard wounded. This catastrophe temporarily laid Spain open to French domination. The northern Spanish army was beaten a week later at the Battle of Alba de Tormes. The way was open for the French conquest of Andalusia.

== Aftermath ==
The Spanish campaign in late 1809 proceeded with the second Madrid offensive in the Battle of Carpio.

== See also ==
- Pieter Hendrik van Zuylen van Nijevelt

== Notes ==
Preceded by Battle of Tamames	Napoleonic Wars; Battle of Ocaña	Succeeded by Battle of Alba de Tormes
