= Spanish uniforms of the Napoleonic Wars =

The Napoleonic Wars was a series of wars lasting from 1803 to 1815. Spain was just one of the many countries which resisted the expansion of the French Empire under Napoleon I. The general population fought as guerrillas, preventing the occupying French forces from obtaining supplies or safe passage.

== Royal Guard ==
=== Infantry ===
Uniforms c.1808
Regiment	Collar	Cuffs	Lapel	Buttons	Piping	Notes
Royal Spanish Guards						
Royal Walloon Guards						
Royal Guard of Halberdiers						

Gallery
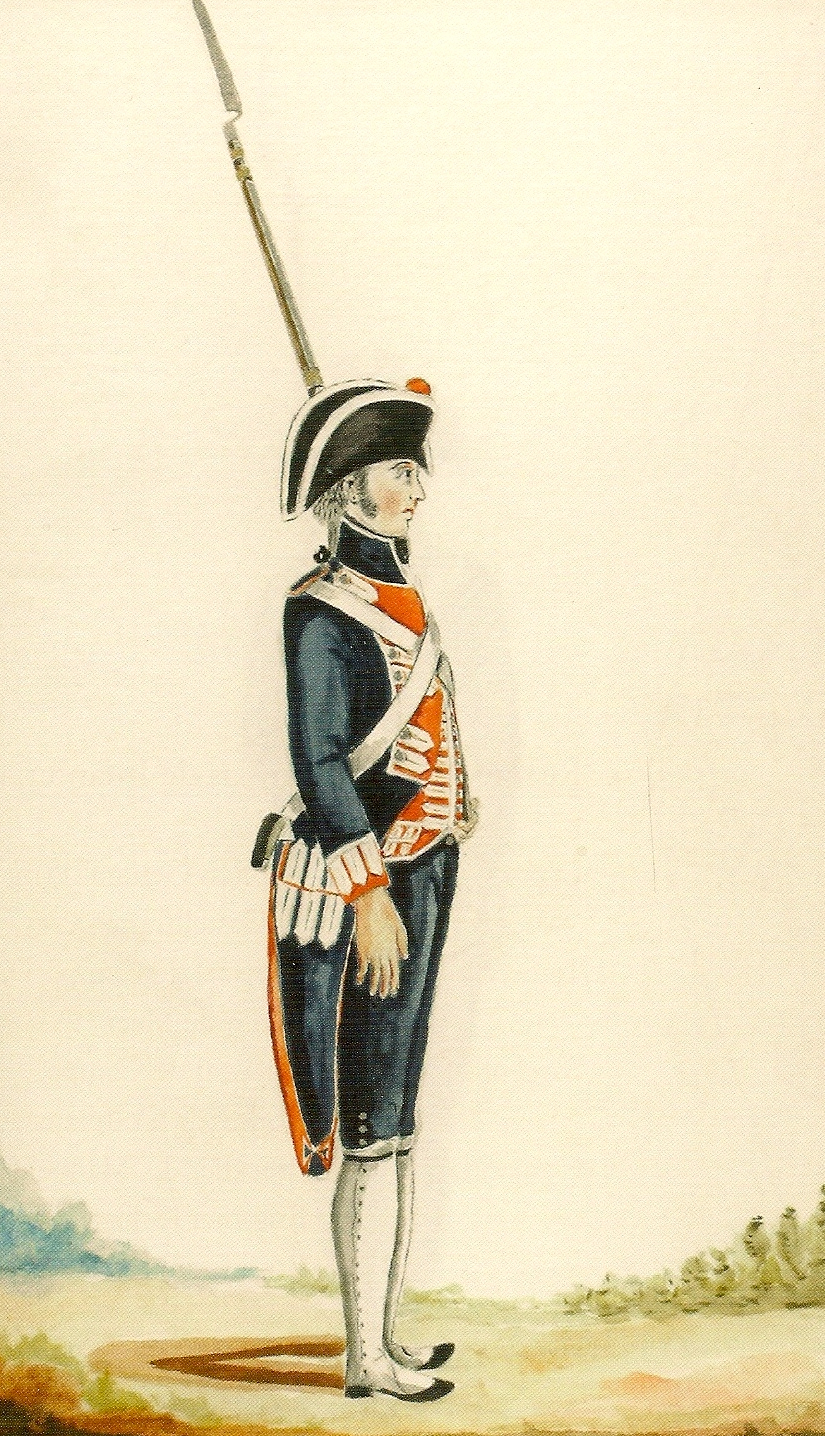
A fusilier of the Royal Spanish Guards in 1806

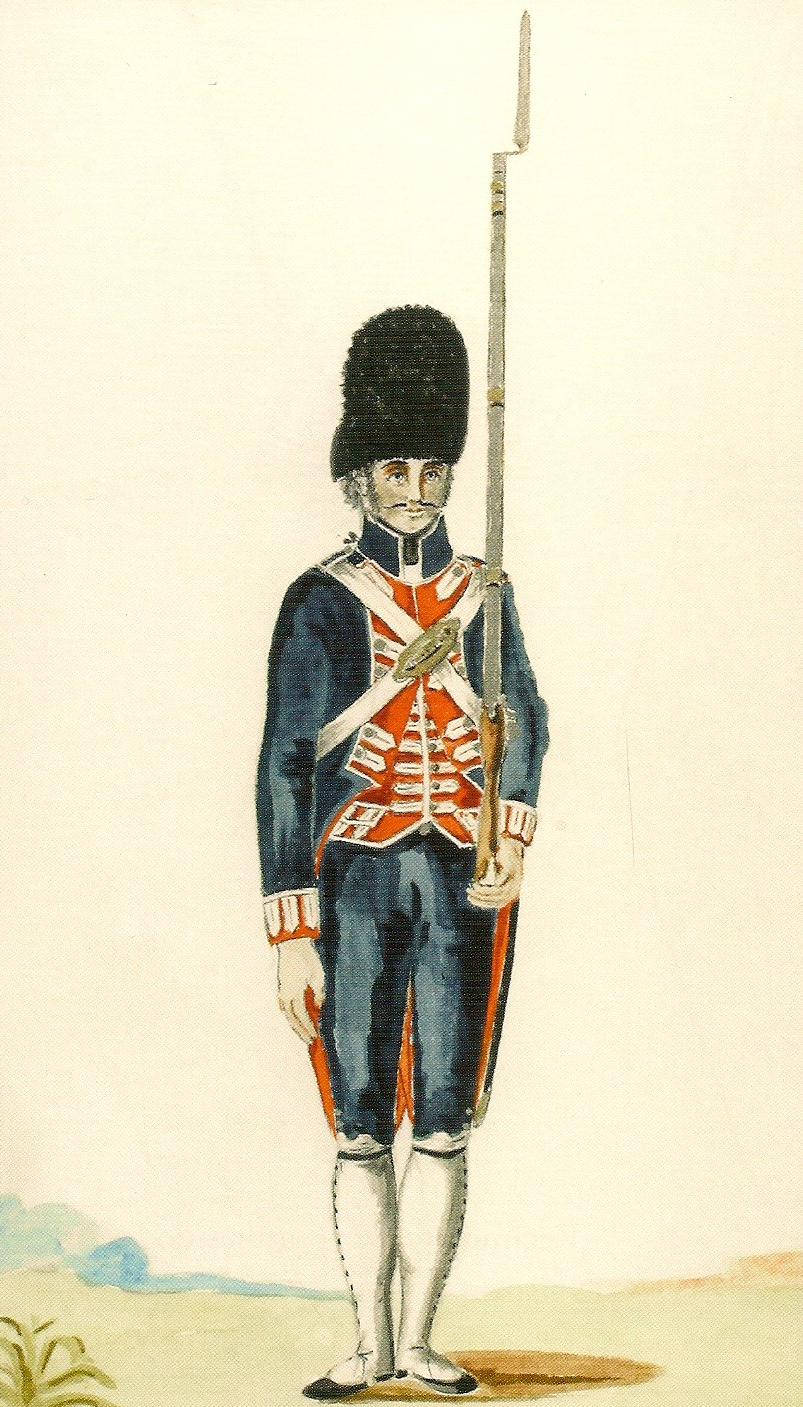
A grenadier of the Royal Spanish Guards in 1806

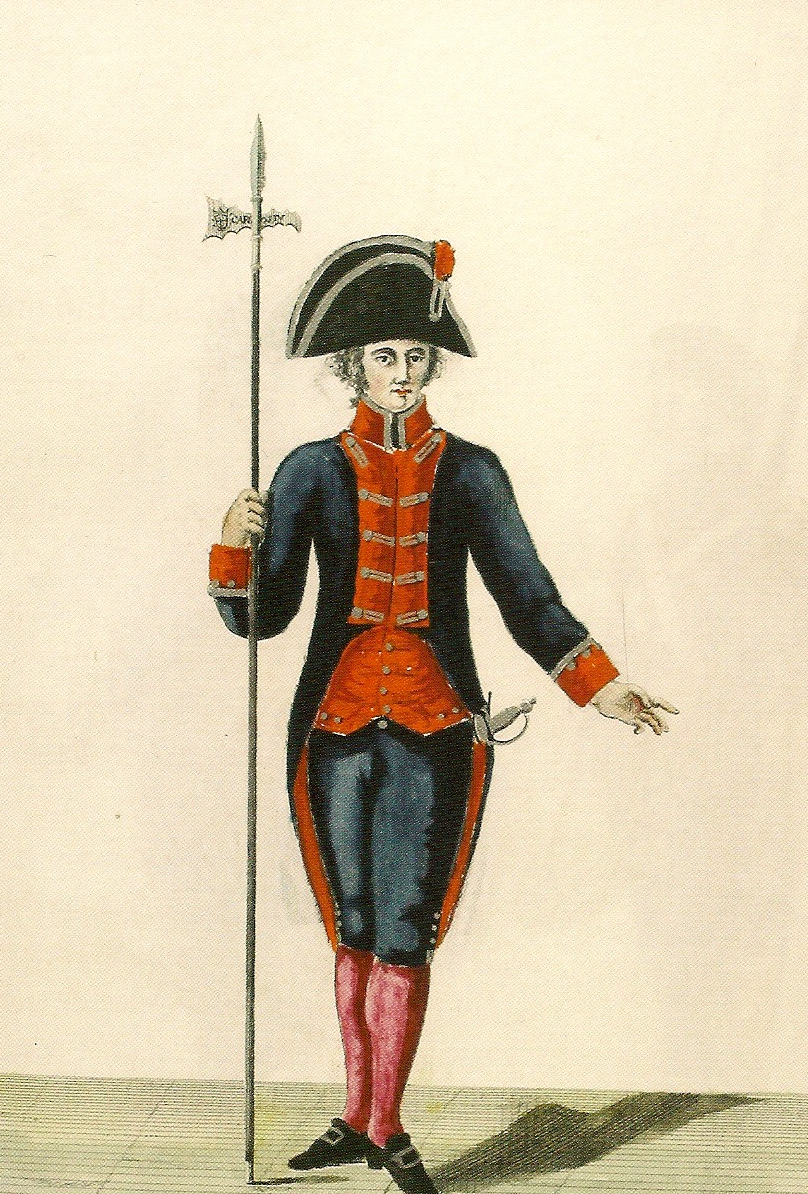
A Halbeedier of the Royal Guard of Halberdiers in 1806
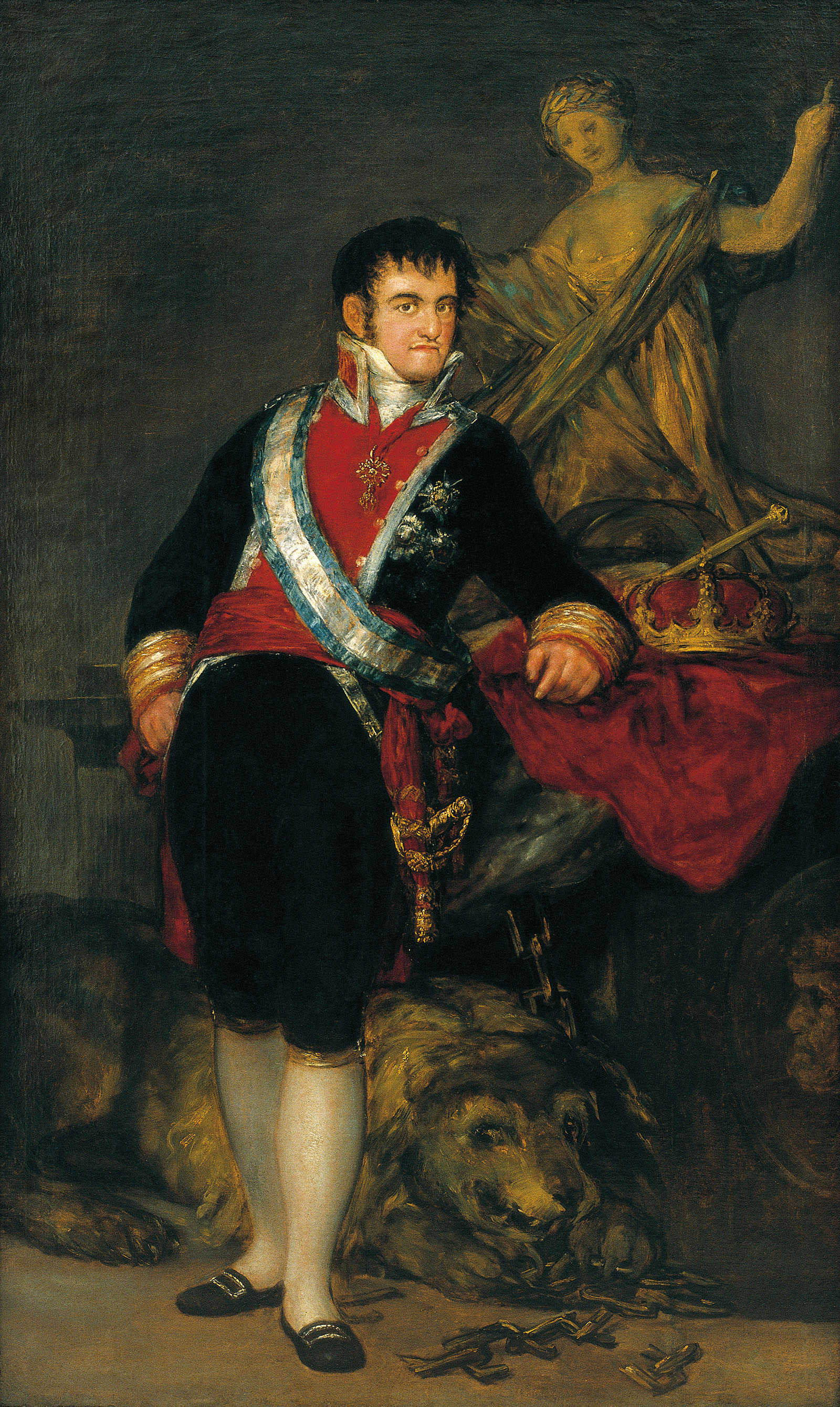
Portrait of Fernando VII in a colonel's uniform

=== Cavalry ===
==== Royal Gardes du Corps ====
Since 1706, the Royal Gardes du Corps consisted of four cavalry companies of around 200 men each; two Spanish companies, an Italian company and a Flemish company. On April 7th, 1793, the second Spanish company was renamed the American company.

Their uniforms consisted of blue jackets and trousers; crimson collars, cuffs, waistcoats, turnbacks all laced with silver, and a black felt bicorne. To distinguish each company, they carried a silver laced bandolier whose quadrant colours varied by regiment; the Spanish Company red, the American Company purple, the Italian Company green, and the Flemish Company yellow.

Bandolier Colour c.1806
Regiment	Colour
Spanish Company	
American Company	
Italian Company	
Flemish Company	

Gallery
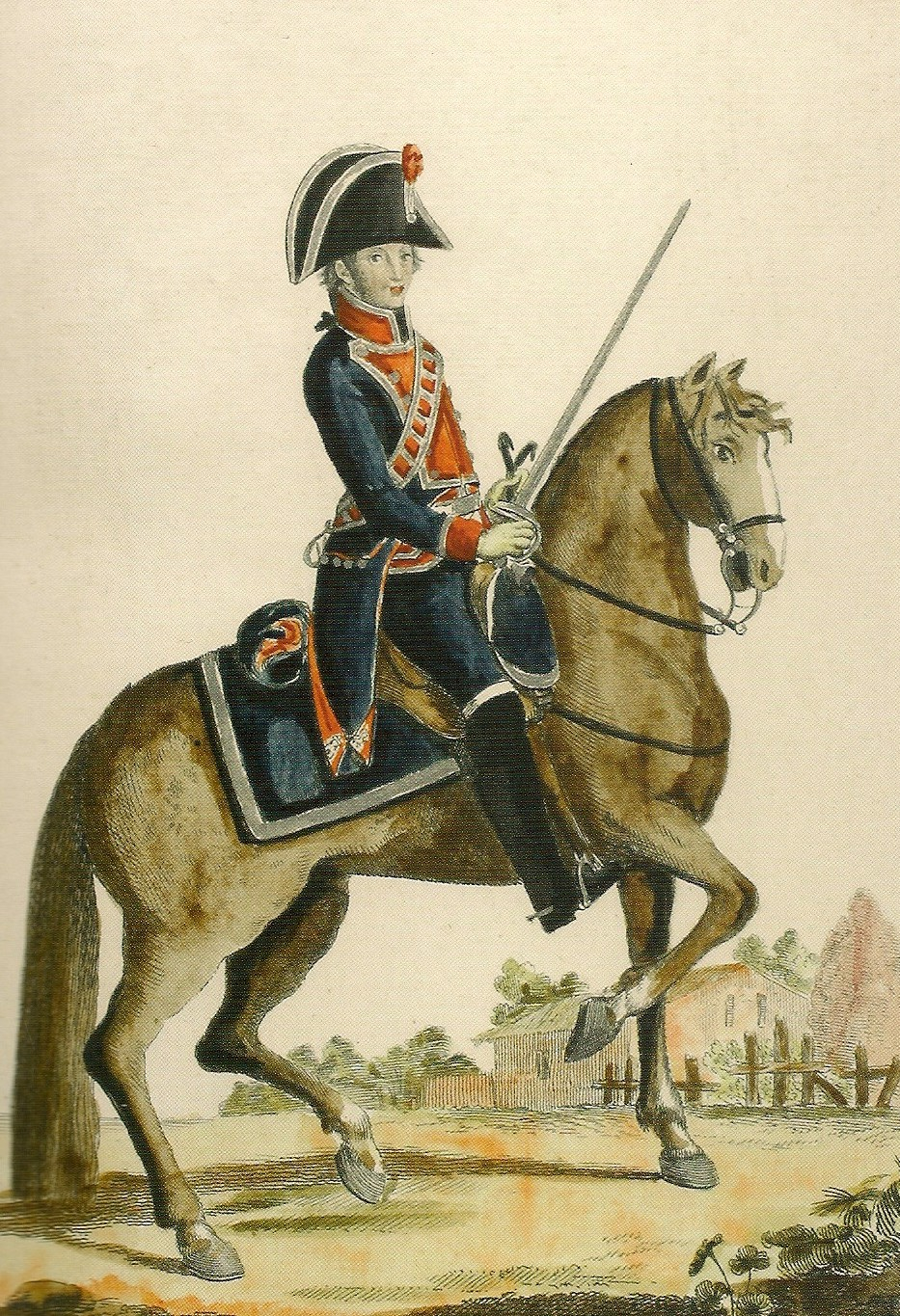
A trooper of the Spanish Company in 1806

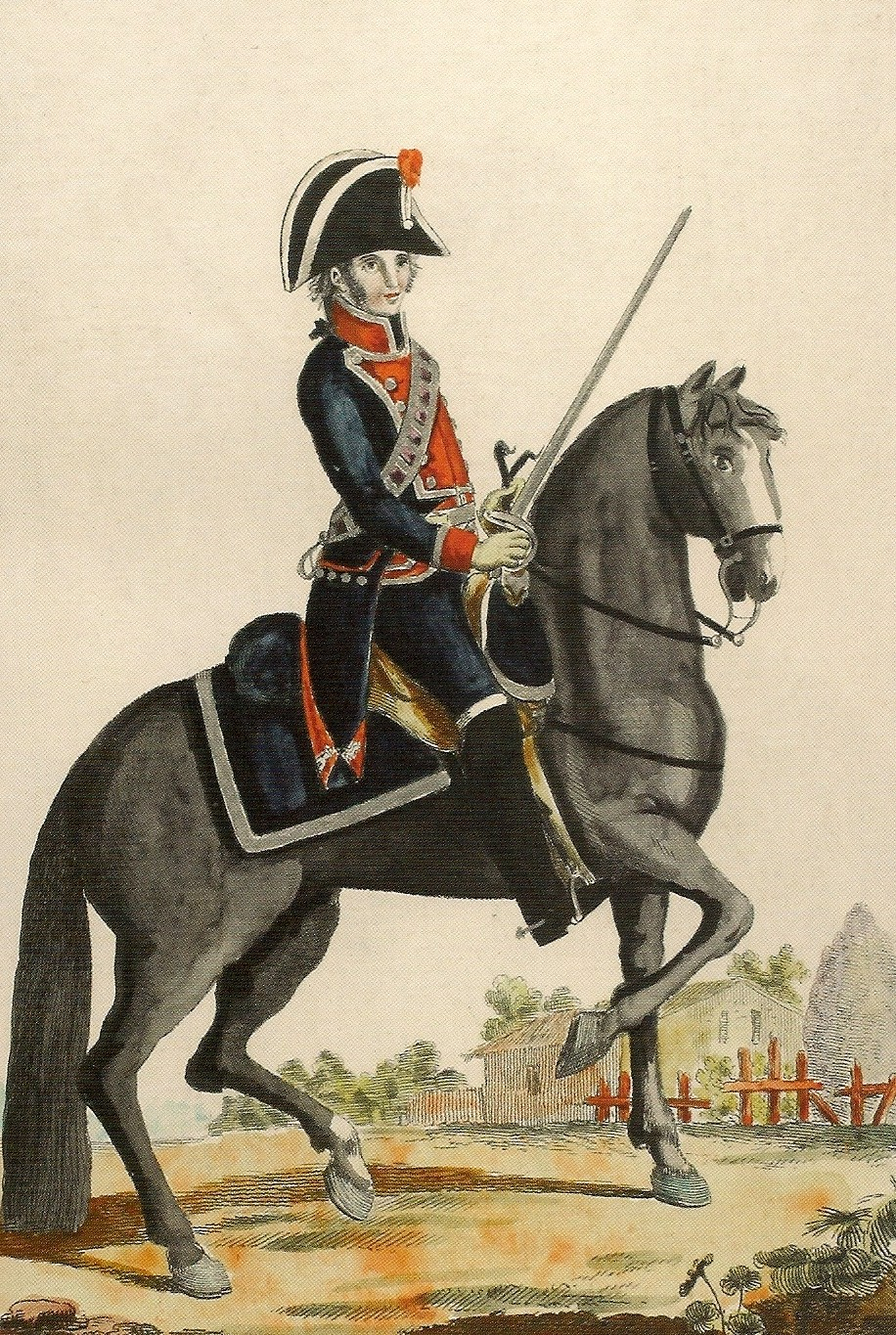
A trooper of the American Company in 1806

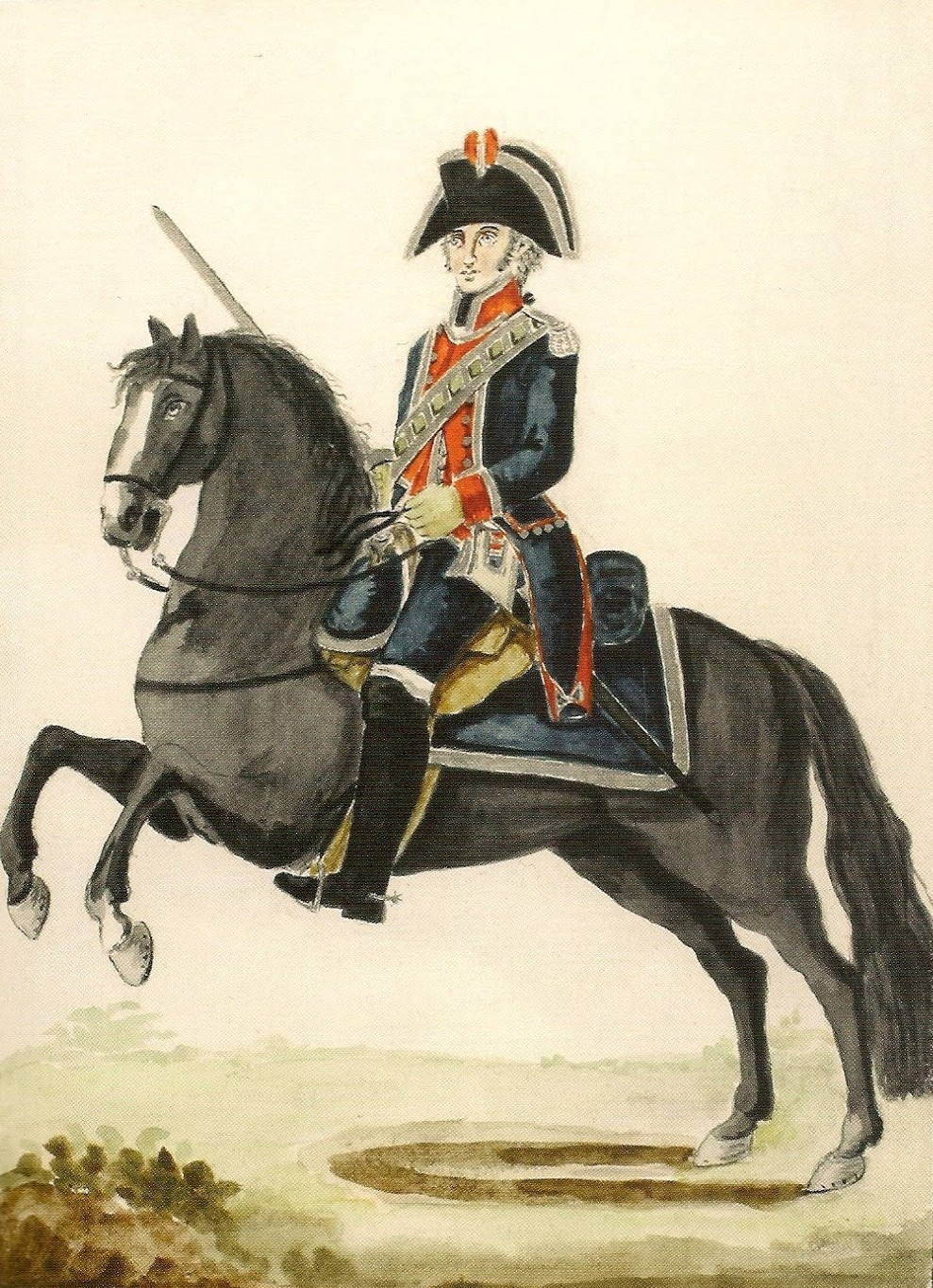
A trooper of the Italian Company in 1806

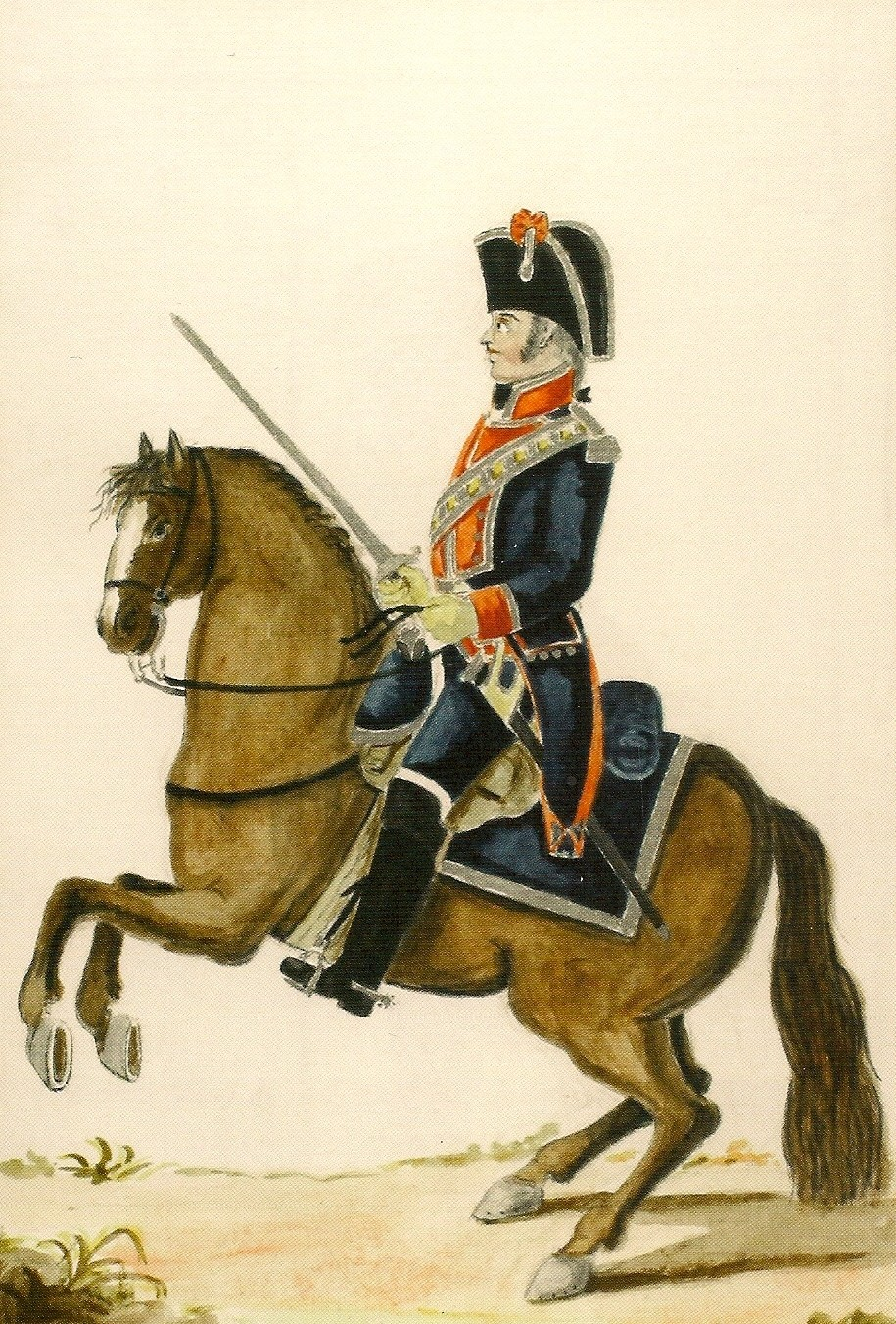
A trooper of the Flemish Company in 1806

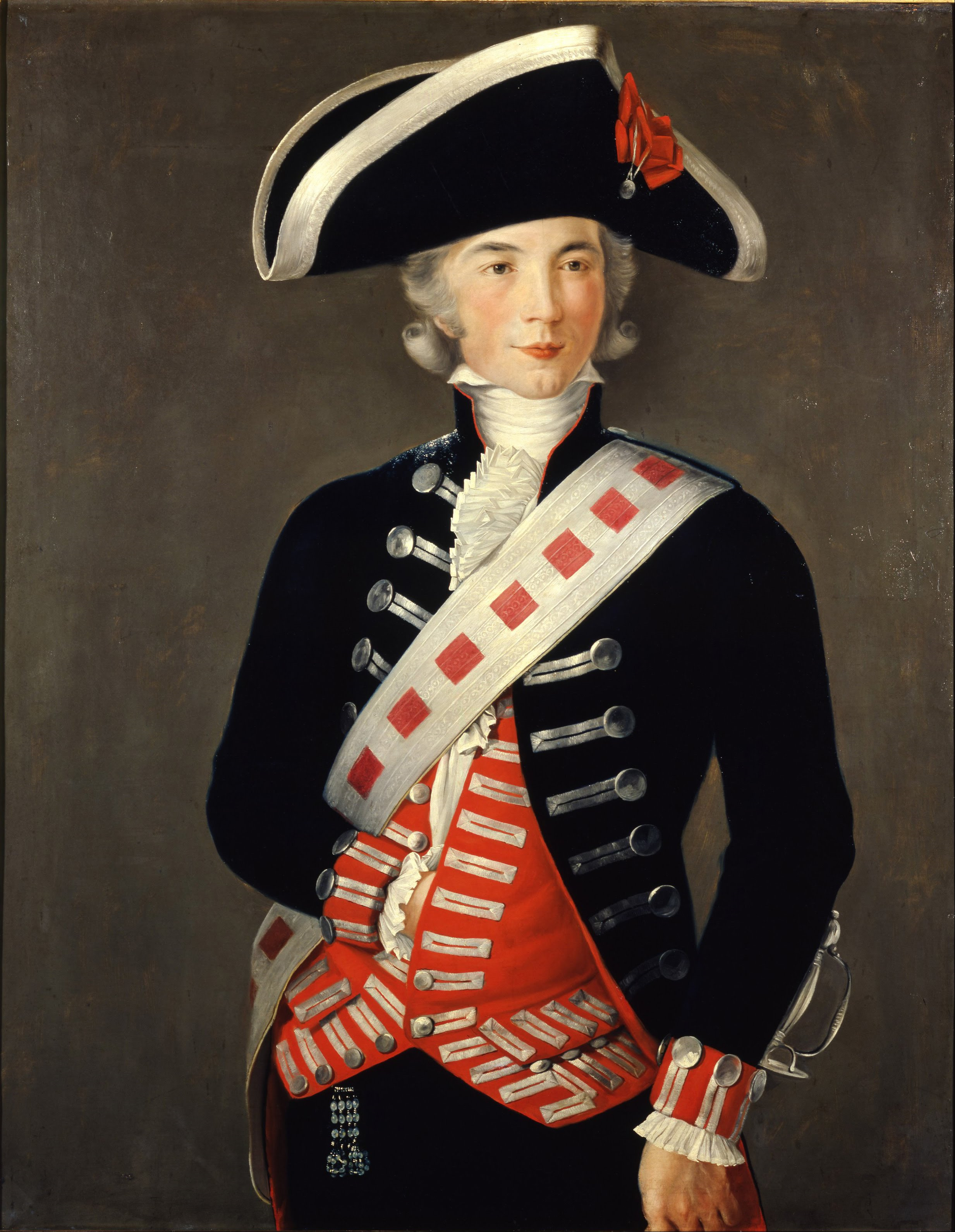
1788 portrait of Manuel Godoy wearing the Spanish Company's uniform

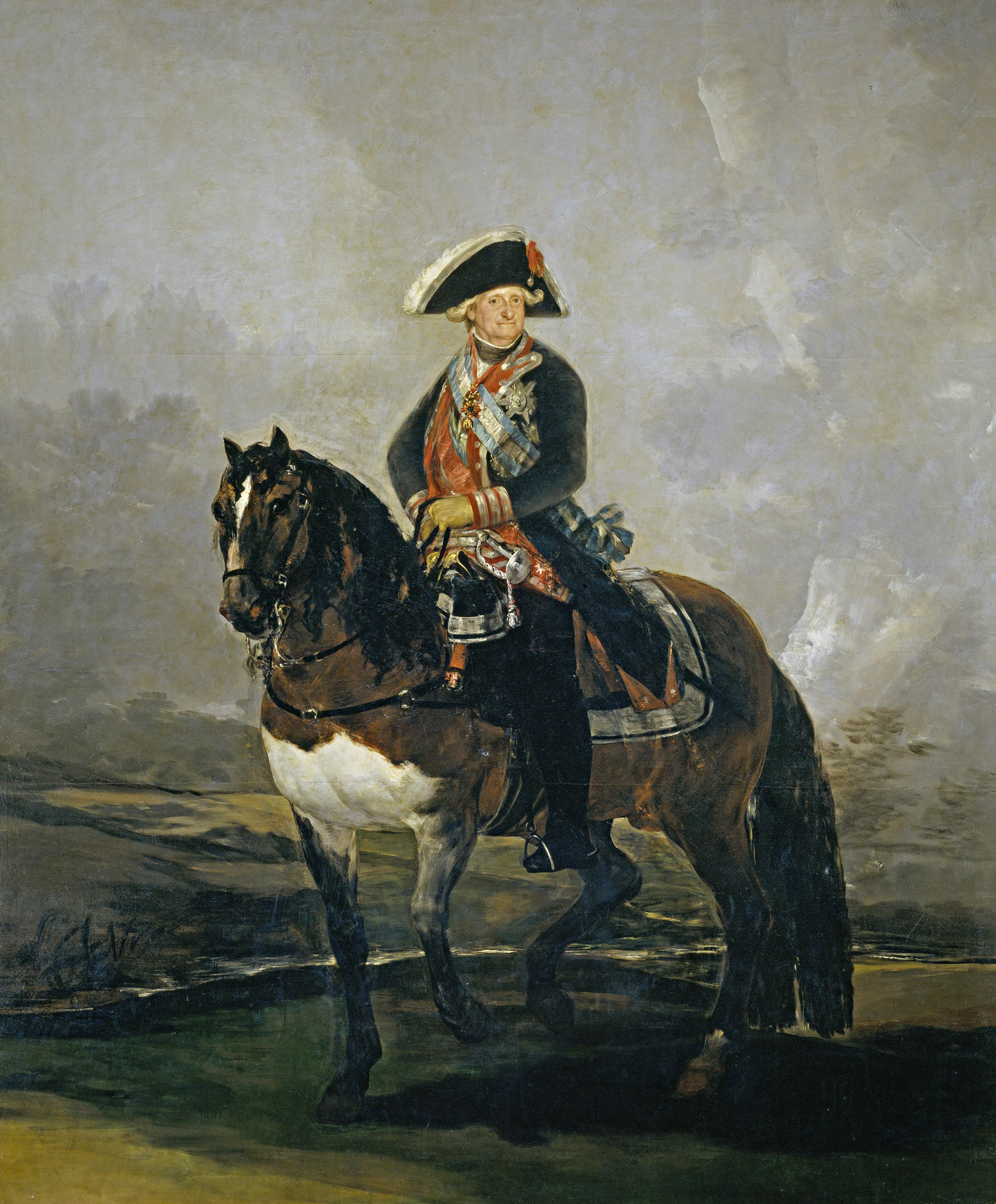
Equestrian portrait of Charles IV of Spain in a colonel's uniform

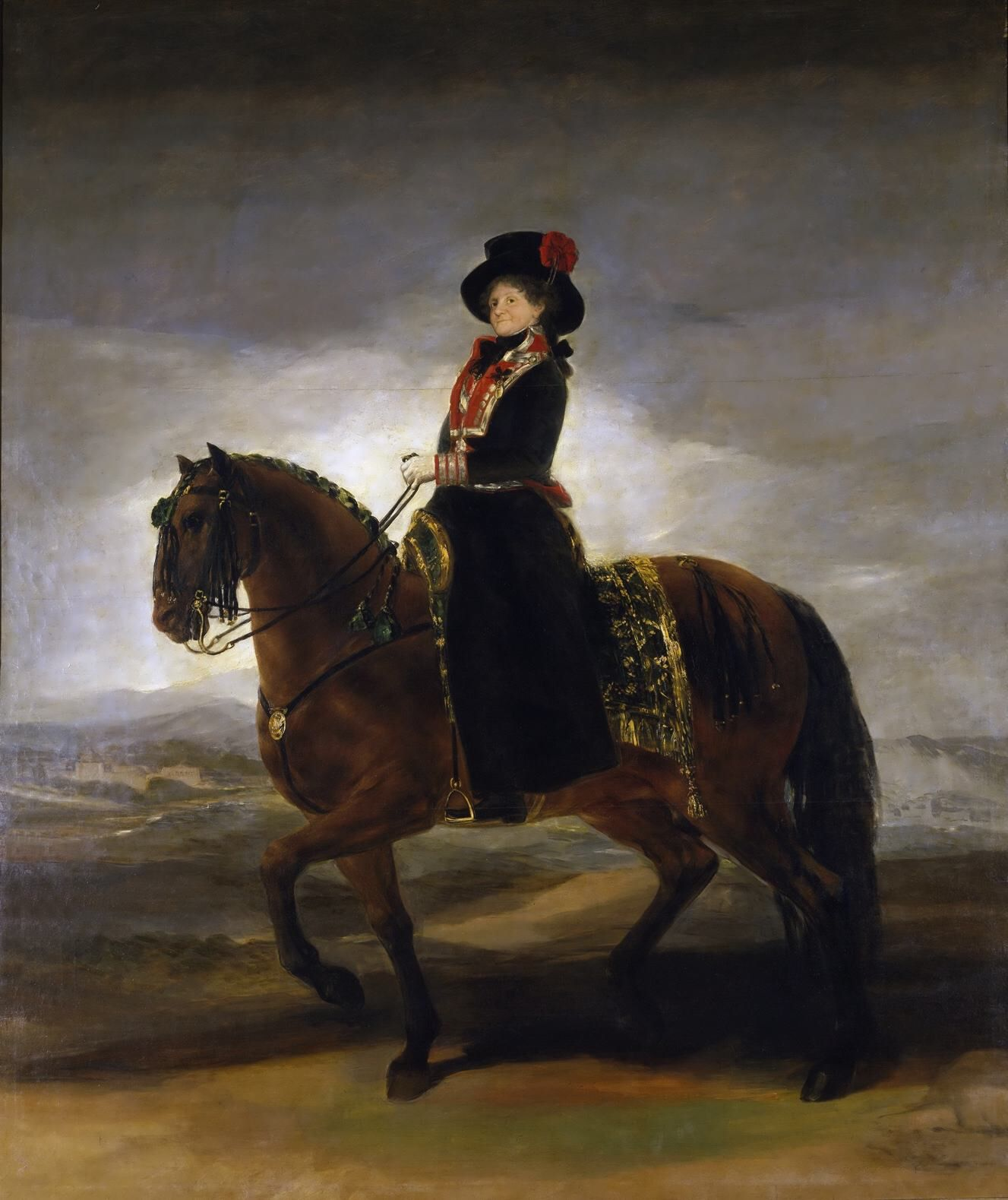
Equestrian portrait of Maria Luisa of Parma in a colonel's uniform modified for her

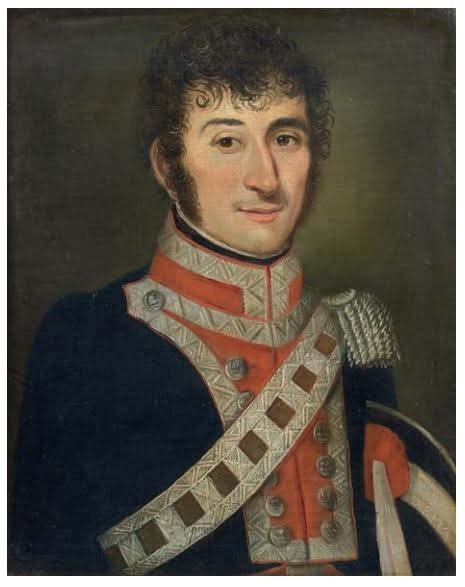
Portrait of a trooper of the Flemish Company

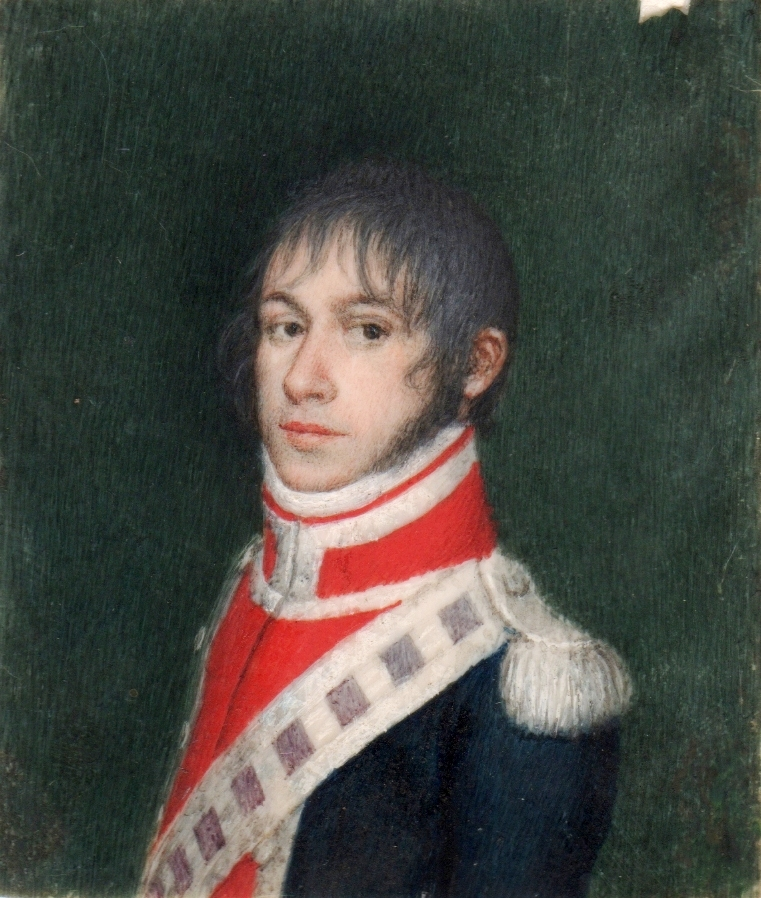
Portrait of a trooper of the American Company

In 1808, the Royal Gardes du Corps was reorganised into three companies named as the 1st, 2nd, and 3rd Company respectively. The uniforms remain the same as the ones in 1805, but the bandolier colours had changed; the 1st Company had red, the 2nd Company had purple, and the 3rd Company had sky-blue.

Bandolier Colour c.1808
Regiment	Colour
1st Company	
2nd Company	
3rd Company	

==== Royal Carabiniers Brigade ====
The Royal Carabiniers Brigade was raised in 1730 and consists of six companies; four of which were line cavalry and two light cavalry. The two light cavalry companies were eventually detached from the brigade to form Manuel Godoy's personal guard under the name of the Admiral's Honor Guard up until his overthrow in 1807, following which they rejoined the Royal Carabiniers Brigade.

The line cavalry companies wore the same uniform as the Royal Gardes du Corps, but with red turnbacks instead. The light cavalry companies in 1806 wore turquoise blue jackets, trousers, and dolmans; crimson waistcoats, collars, cuffs, and turnbacks all laced with silver; a mirliton with white braids and a blue plume.

Gallery
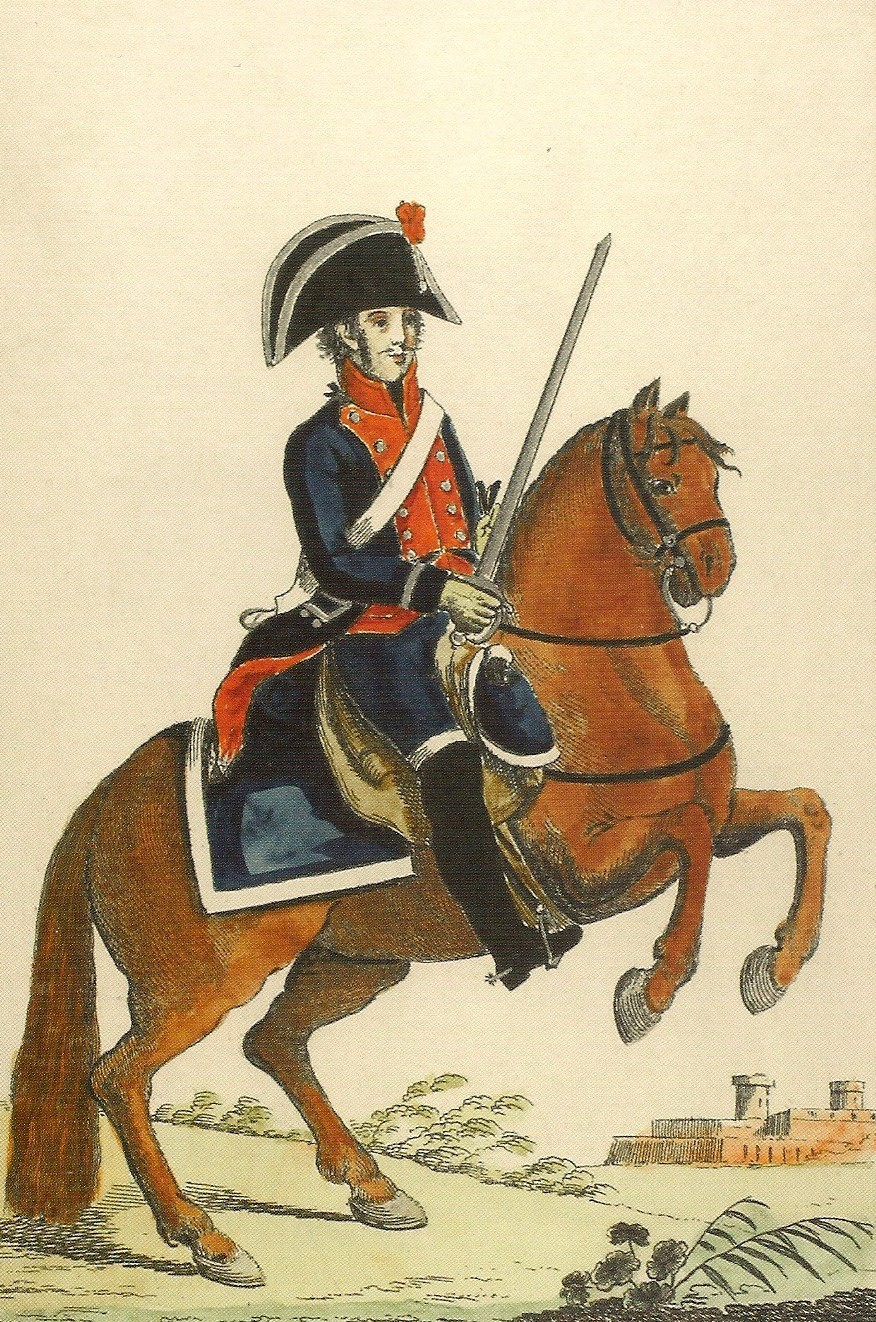
Trooper of a line cavalry company of the Royal Carabiniers Brigade in 1806

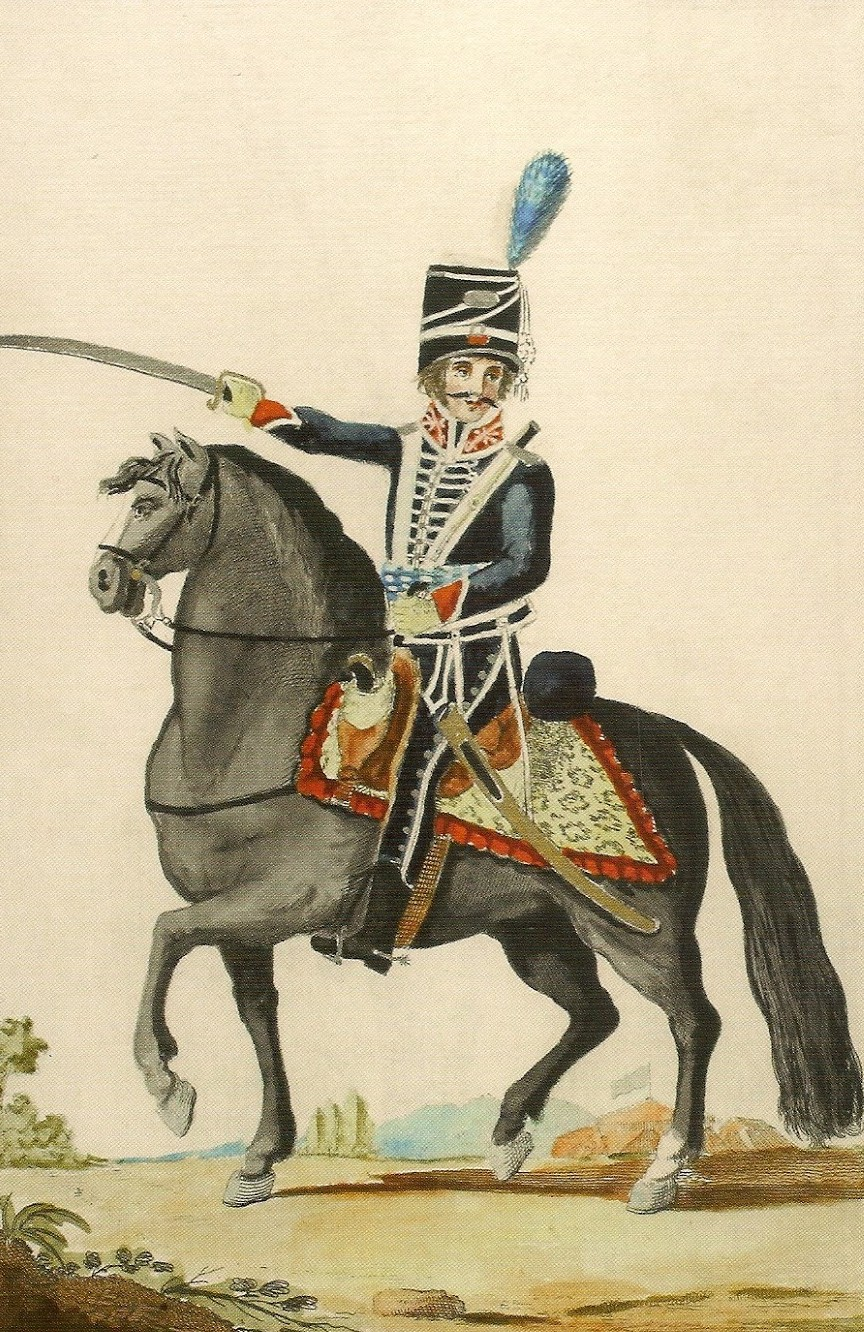
Trooper of a light cavalry company of the Royal Carabiniers Brigade in 1806

== Infantry ==
=== Line infantry ===
The Spanish line infantry uniform changed several times during the Napoleonic wars. Initially beginning with state supplied clothing, locally produced, or war spoils. After 1811, the British began supplying supplies of their own.

The M1797 uniform was officially listed as being white with collars, cuffs and facings according in the regimental facing colours and distinguished by their pattern combination. 3 regiments were recorded as still wearing this uniform as late as May 1808.

The M1802 uniform consisted of a dark blue coat, black facings with red piping, and white trousers. The bicorne remained the same as the previous M1797 uniform, having a red plume and cockade. Additionally, the collar featured 2 Fleur-de-lys on each side. 12 Regiments were recorded to have been using this uniform as late as May 1808.

The unpopular M1802 uniform was replaced by the M1805, which restored the white coats and distinctive regimental colours of the M1797 uniform. These were used to distinguish between regiments, by a combination of cuffs, collars and facings in either facing colour piped white or white piped with the facing colour. Buttons were also used, either pewter or brass. Turnbacks on the jackets were always white, piped with facing colours.

The grenadier uniforms were nearly identical to that of the fusiliers', but with a few distinctive features; the cuffs featured bars known as "Sardines", and featured flaming grenades in facing colours on the turnbacks. The Bearskin was either brown or black, and featured a long cloth device (sleeve) in facing colour with the regimental or provincial emblem and embroidery in button colour.

Uniforms c.1808
Regiment	Collar	Cuffs	Lapel	Buttons	Piping	Notes
Rey/Immemorial						
Reyna						
Príncipe						
Saboya						
Corona						
África						
Zamora						
Soria						
Córdova						
Guadalajara						
Sevilla						
Granada						
Valencia						
Zaragoza						
España						
Toledo						
Mallorca						
Burgos						
Murcia						
León						
Cantabria						
Asturias						
Fixo de Zeuta/Ceuta						
Navarra						
Aragón						
América						
Princesa						
Extremadura						
Málaga						
Jaén						
Las Órdenes Militares						
Voluntarios de Castilla						
Voluntarios del Estado						
Voluntarios de la Corona						
Borbón						

Gallery
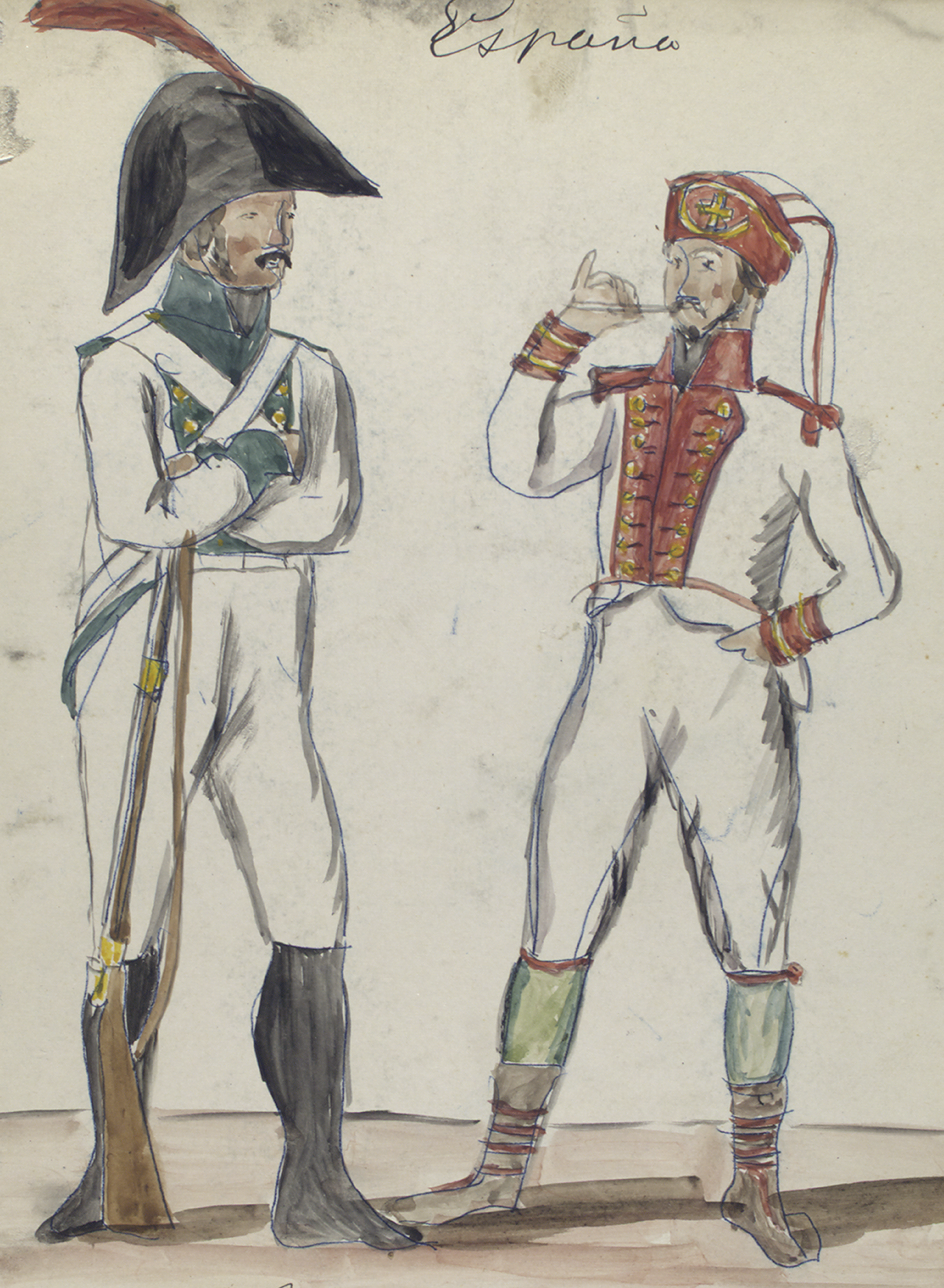
Asturias Regiment fusilier (left) and a Guadalajara Regiment fusilier (right) in 1807

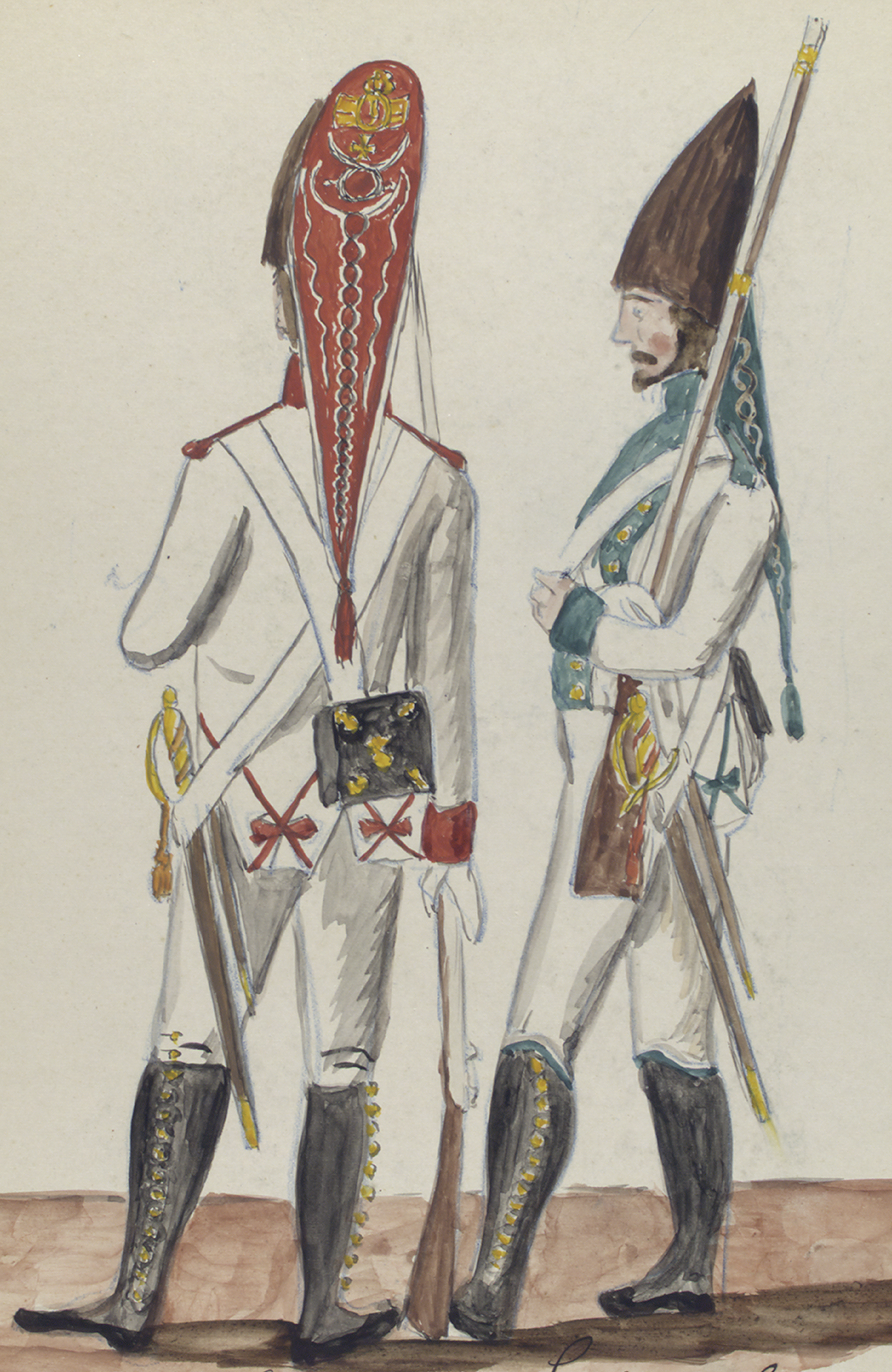
Guadalajara Regiment grenadier (left) and an Asturias Regiment grenadier (right) in 1807
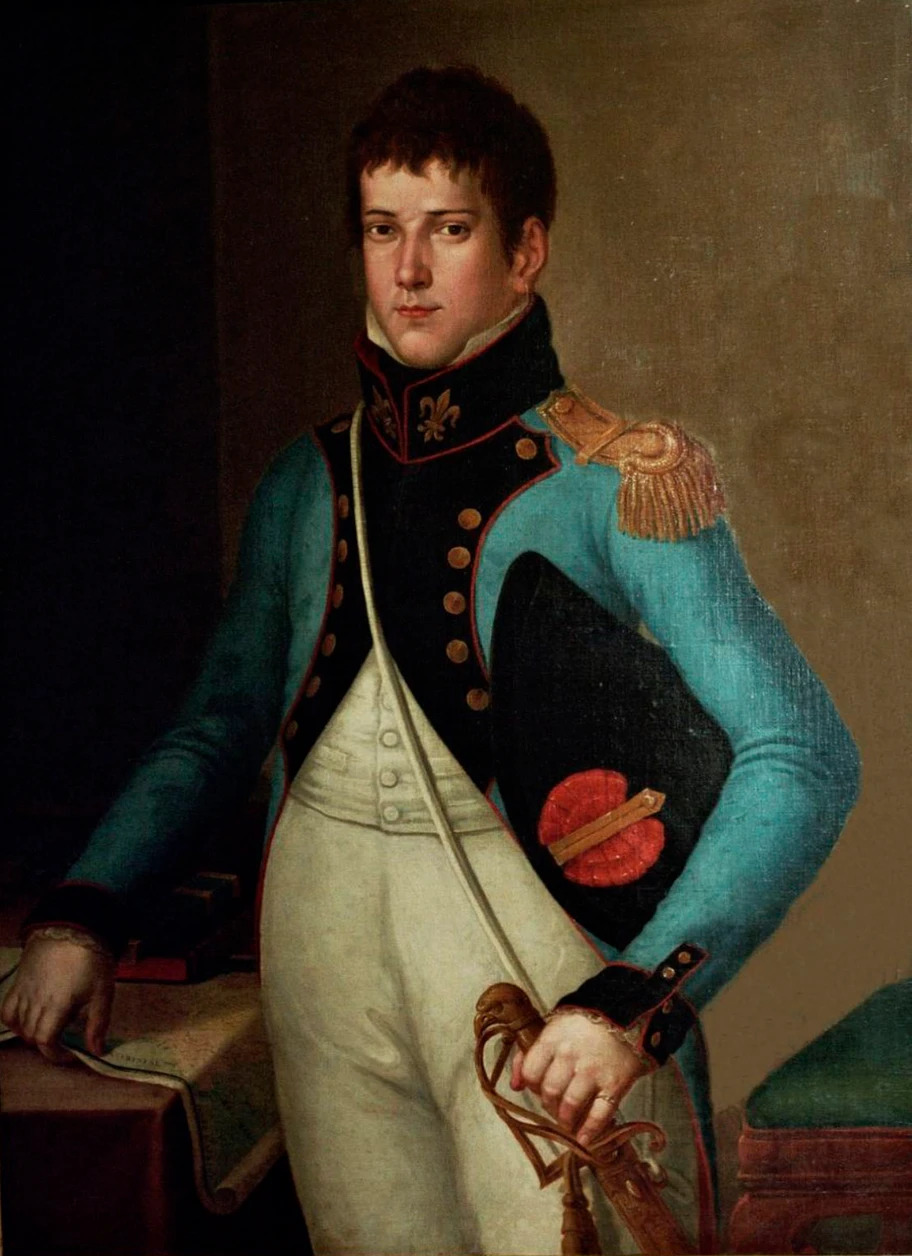
Portrait of Sublieutenant Fernández Cossío of the Murcia Regiment

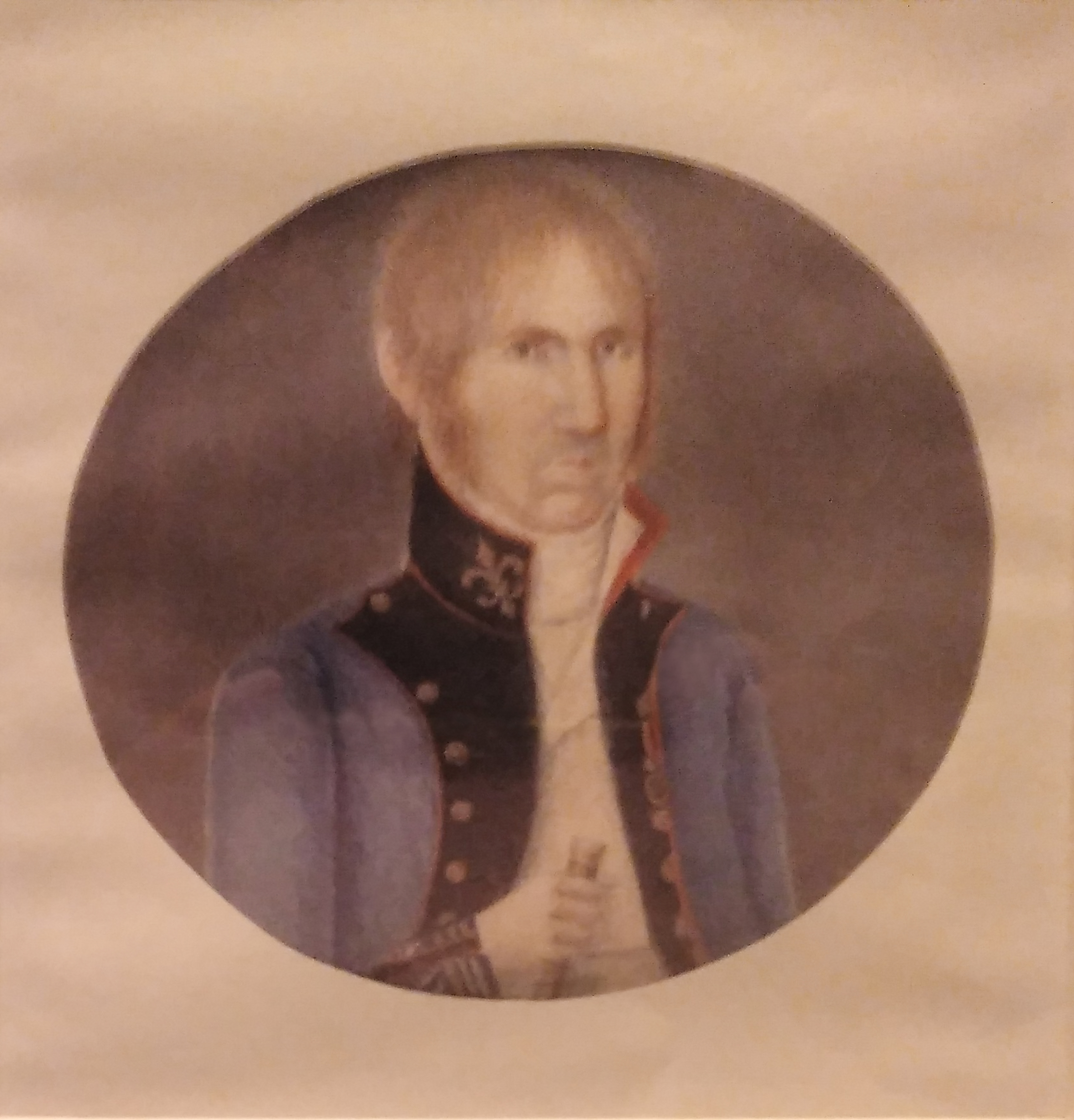
Portrait of Brigadier Joaquín Blake, Colonel of the Voluntarios del Estado Regiment in 1808

=== Foreign regiments in Spanish service ===
Uniforms c. 1808
Regiment	Collar	Cuffs/turnbacks	Lapels	Buttons	Piping	Notes
Irlanda						
Hibernia						
Ultonia						
Nápoles						
1º Suizo de Wimpffen						
2º Suizo de Ruttiman/Reding Snr						
3º Suizo de Reding Jnr						
4º Suizo de Betschartd						
5º Suizo de Traxler						
6º Suizo de Courten/Preux						

Gallery
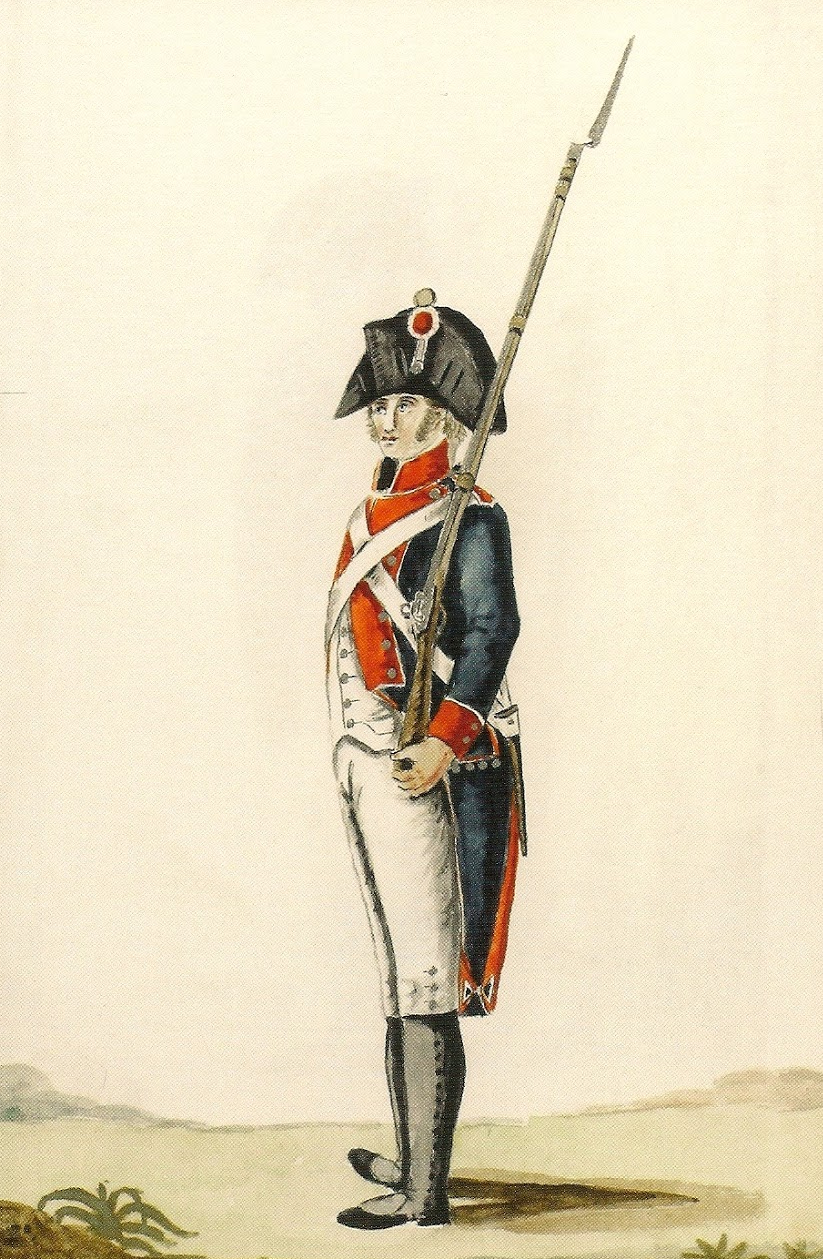
Private of the Swiss regiments in 1806

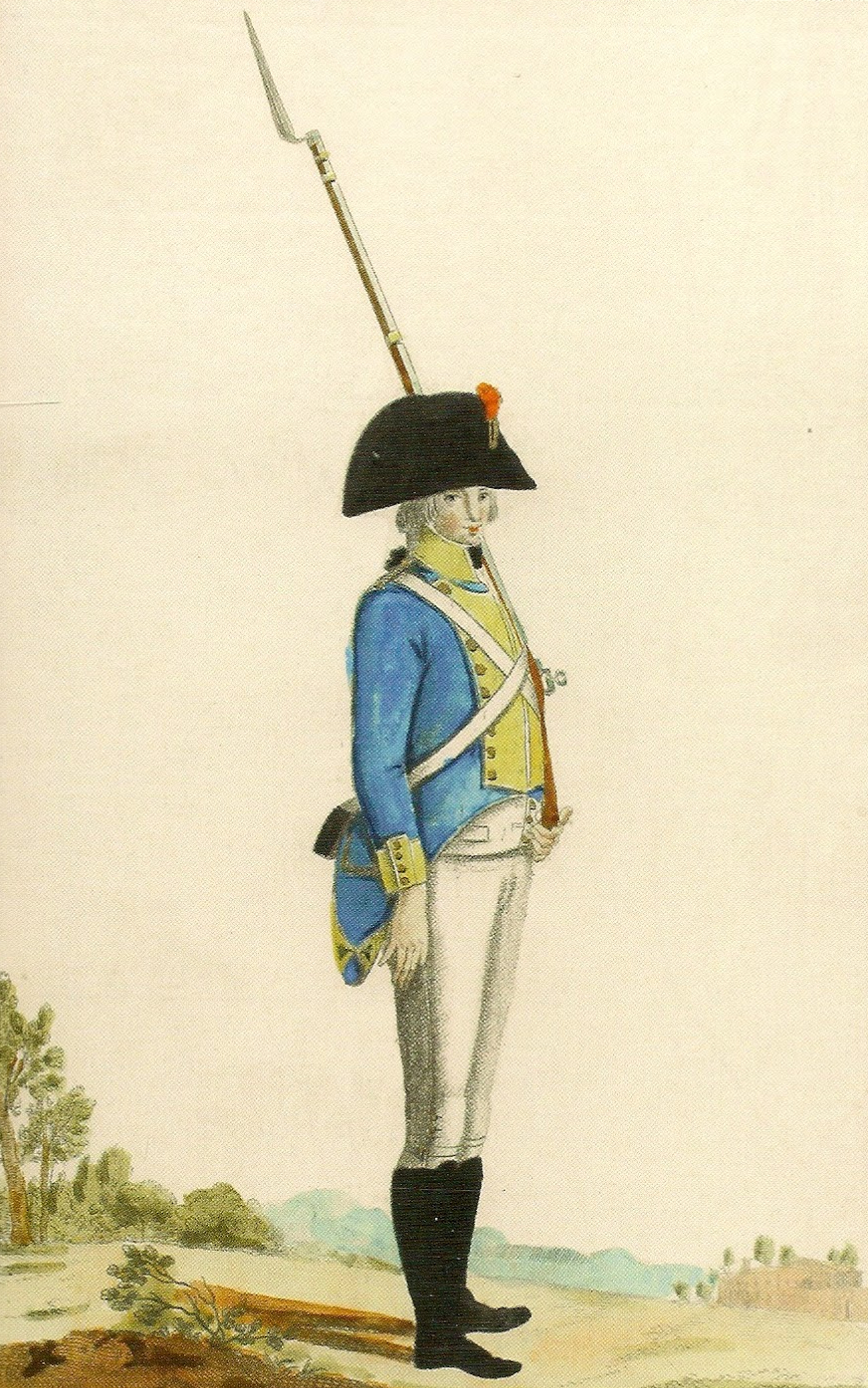
Private of the Irlanda Regiment in 1806

=== Light infantry ===
The original Cazadores uniform of a black bicorn, green jacket with red lapels and cuffs was replaced with the M1800 issue of a dark blue jacket with red facings and maintaining the other equipment.

The M1802 uniform was styled after the hussar uniform of the time. A green jacket with yellow lace, red collars and cuffs with the Tarleton replacing the bicorn for ordinary ranks.

The M1805 uniform returned to a dark blue uniform modelled after the infantry with facing colours, combinations and button colour depending on regiment. Instead of a bicorn or a helmet, the new headgear issued was a Shako. Despite this, many of the light infantry of La Romana's Division retained their M1802 uniform and only few received the new uniform, such as 1st Barcelona.

Uniforms c.1808
Regiment	Collar	Cuffs	Lapel	Turnback	Pockets	Buttons	Ref
1º de Aragón	Red piped white	Red piped white	Red piped white	Red	Red piping	White metal	
1º de Cataluña	Yellow piped white	Yellow piped white	Yellow piped white	Red	Red piping	White metal	
2º de Cataluña	Dark blue piped white	Yellow piped white with yellow cuff flaps	Yellow	Yellow	Yellow piping	Brass	
Tarrogona	Yellow	Yellow	Dark blue piped yellow	Yellow	Yellow piping	Brass	
Gerona	Yellow	Yellow	Yellow piped white	Yellow	Yellow piping	White metal	
2º de Aragón	Dark blue piped white	Red piped white	Red piped white	Red piped white	Red piping	White metal	
1º de Barcelona	Yellow	Yellow	Dark blue piped white	Yellow	Yellow piping	White metal	
2º de Barcelona							
Barbastro							
Voluntarios de Valencia							
Campo Mayor							
Voluntarios de Navarra							

Gallery
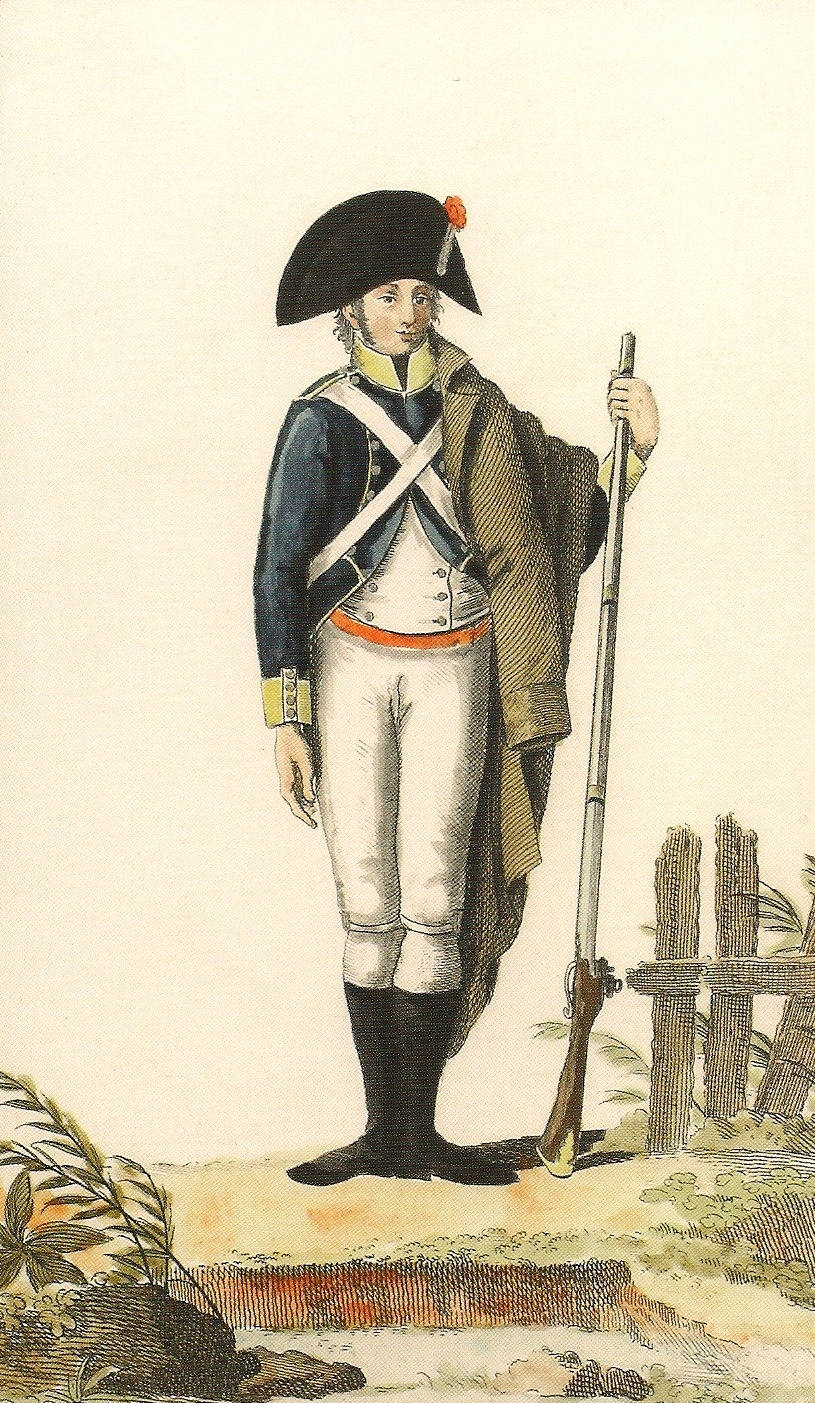
Private of the 1st Barcelona Battalion in 1800

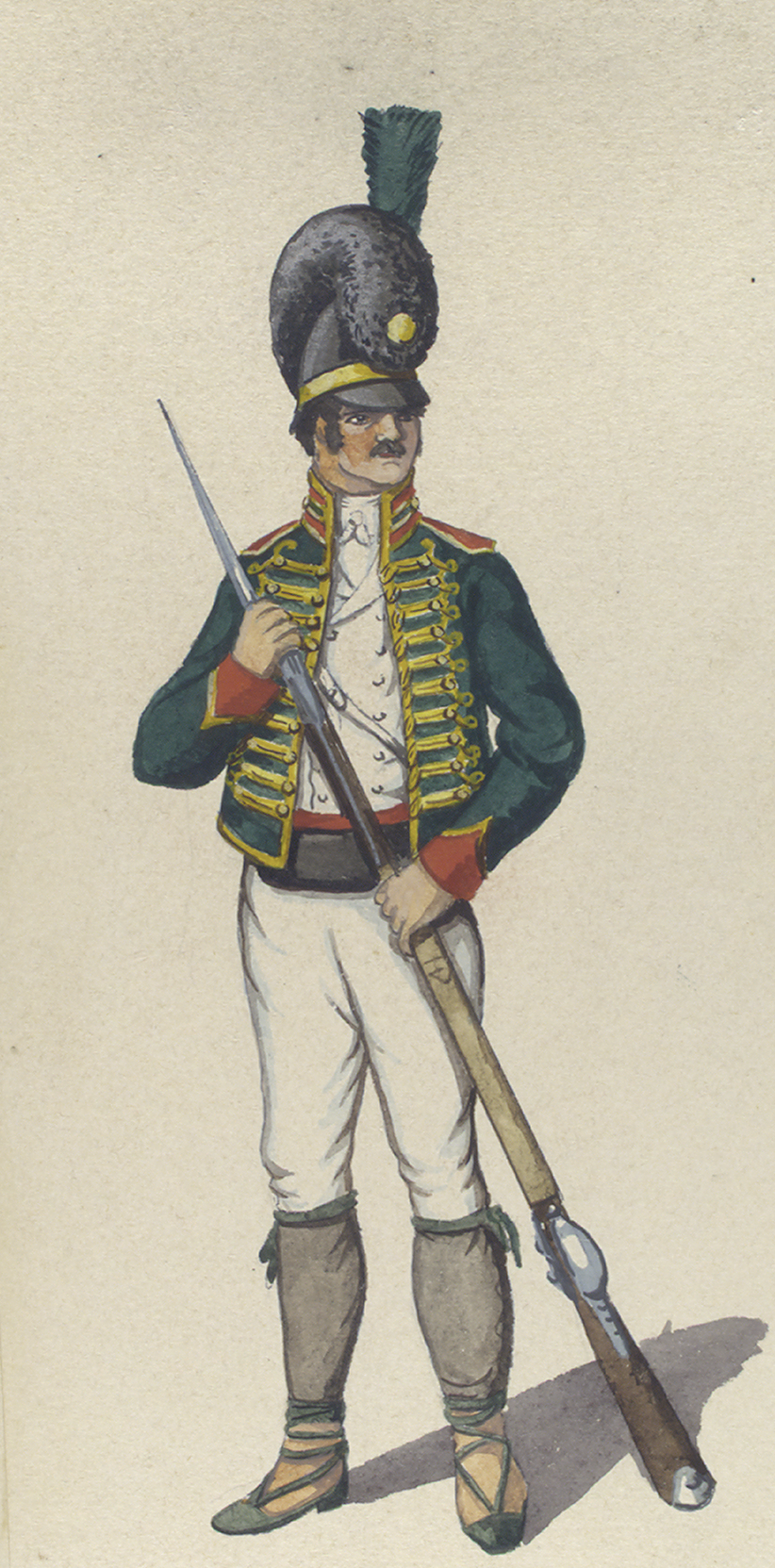
Private of the Catalonia Battalion 1807

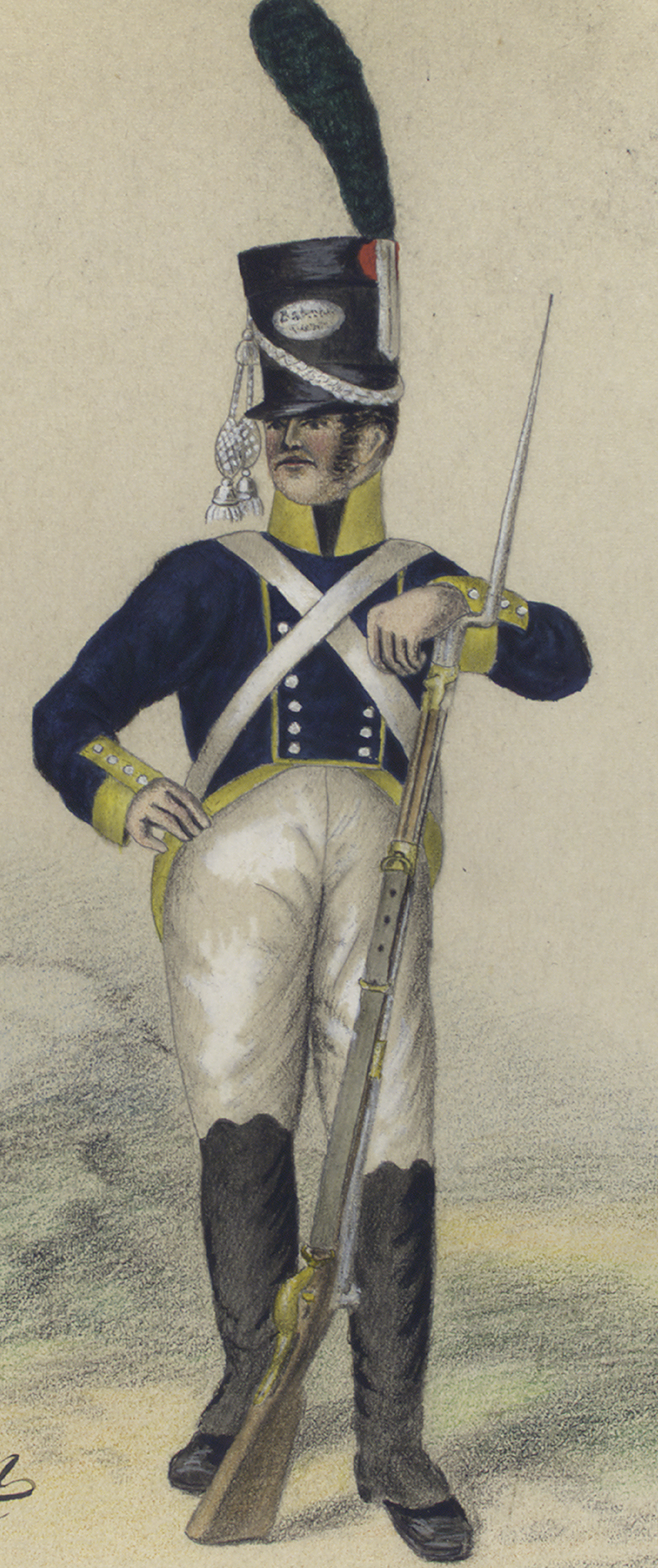
Private of the 1st Barcelona Battalion in 1807

=== Provincial Militia ===
The Provincial Militia were formed in the 18th century from each Spanish province; 28 in 1734 and 14 in 1766.

Their uniforms consisted of nothing more than a white jacket and trousers, red facings, gold buttons inscribed with the province or capital's name, and a felt bicorne.

Gallery
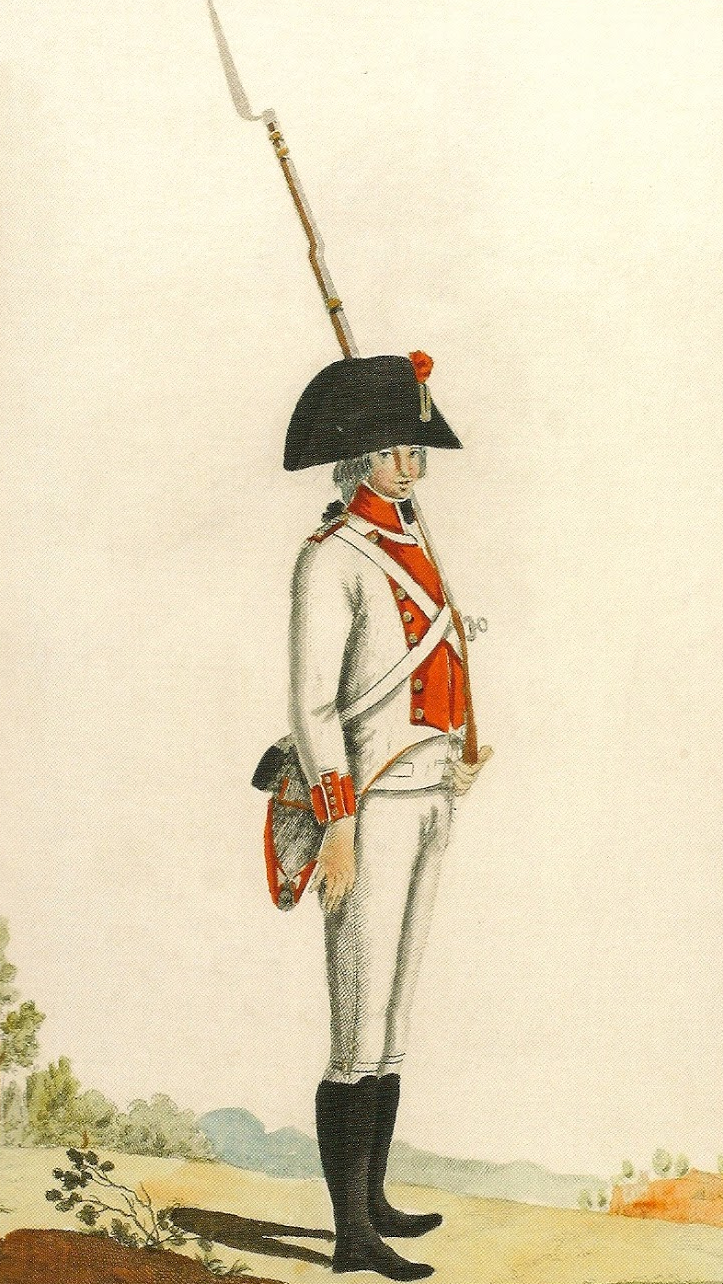
Ordinance Uniform of Provincial Militia in 1806

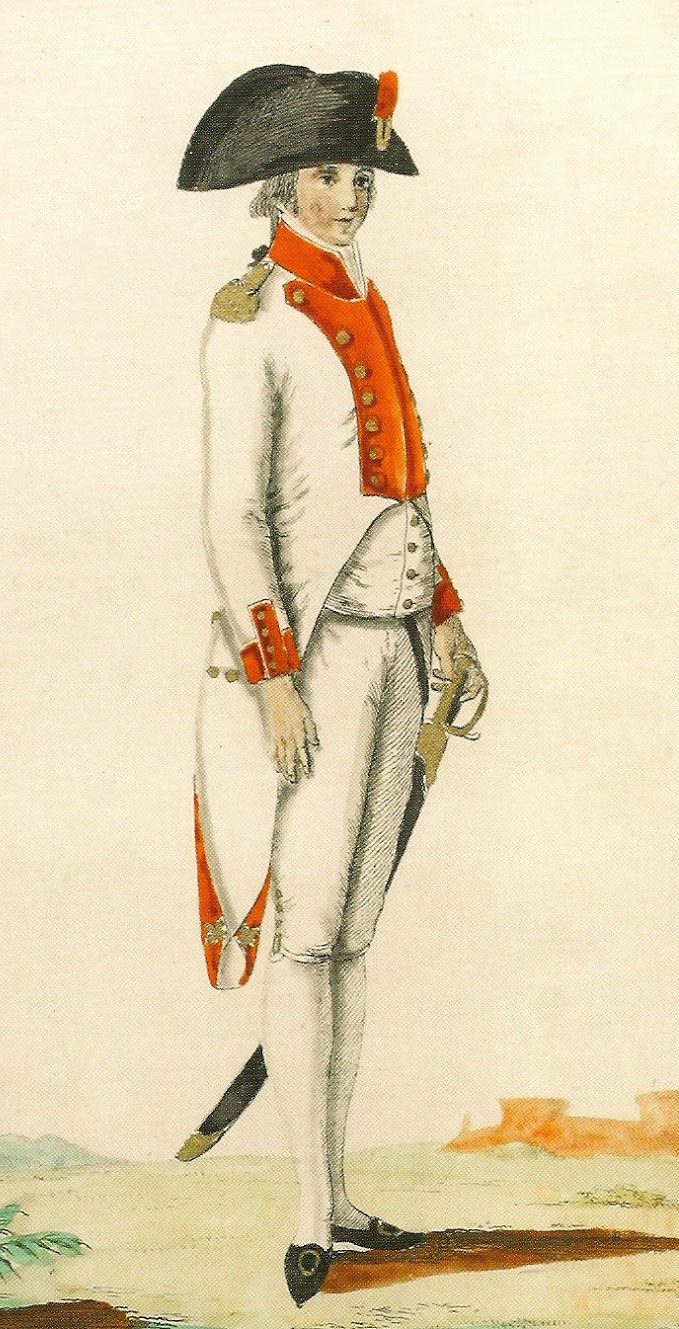
Ordinance Uniform of Provincial Militia Officers in 1806
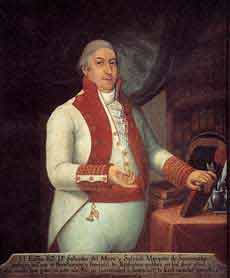
Portrait of Colonel Someruelos

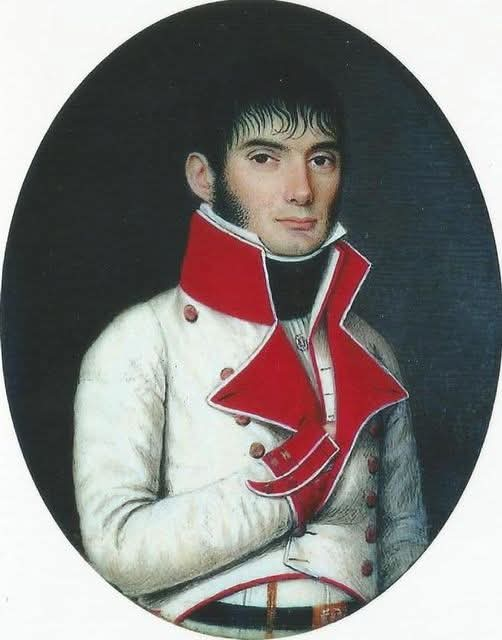
Portrait of Lieutenant-Colonel Juan Gregorio Jaques de Mesa of the Provincial Militia of La Palma

== Cavalry ==
=== Line cavalry ===
Uniforms c.1808
Regiment	Collar	Cuffs	Lapel	Buttons	Notes
King's Cavalry Regiment					
Queen's Cavalry Regiment					
Prince's Cavalry Regiment					
Infante's Cavalry Regiment					
Bourbon Cavalry Regiment					
Farnesio Cavalry Regiment					
Alcántara Cavalry Regiment					
Spanish Cavalry Regiment					
Algarve Cavalry Regiment					
Calatrava Cavalry Regiment					
Santiago Cavalry Regiment					
Montesa Cavalry Regiment					

Gallery
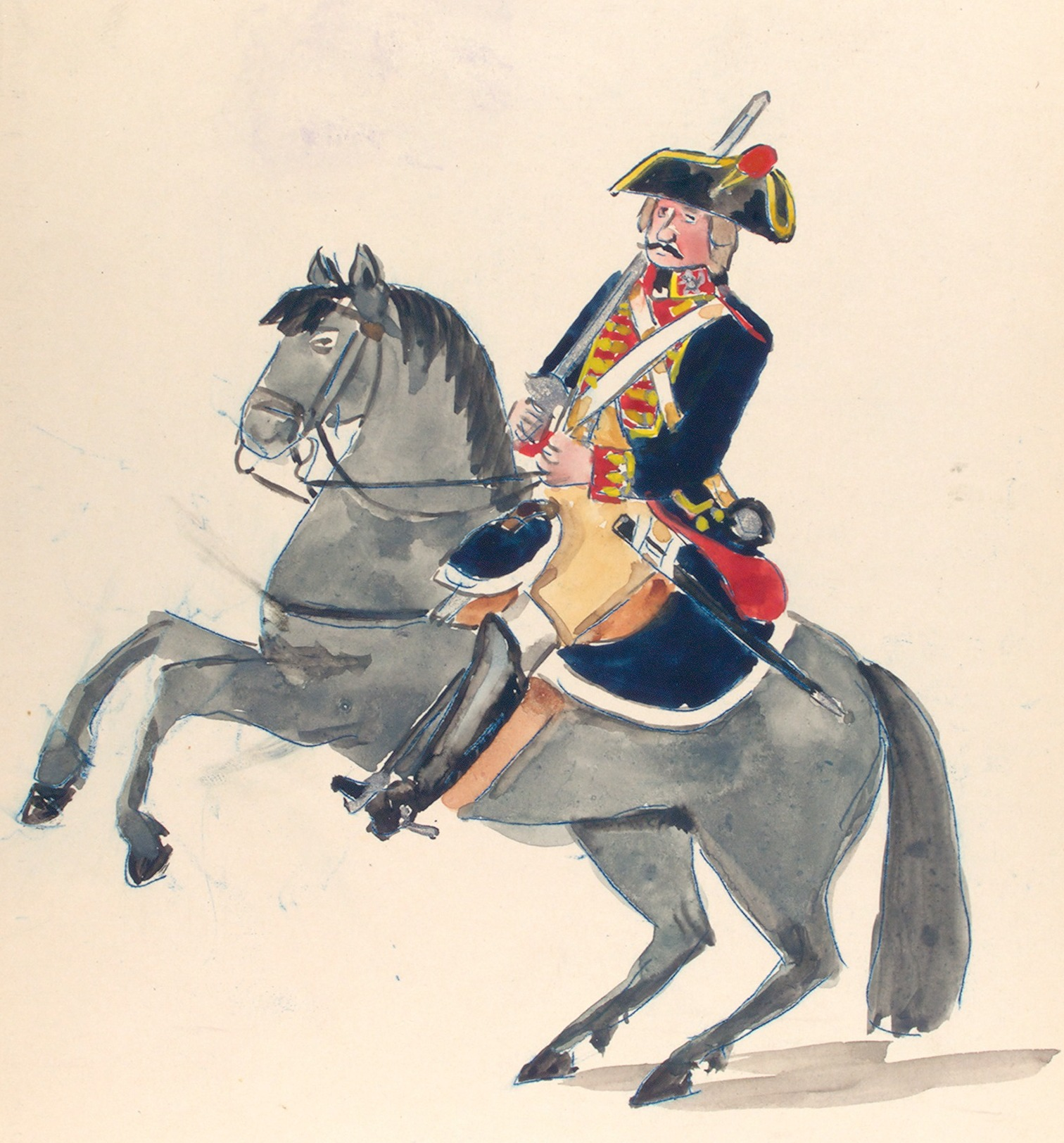
Trooper of the Cavalry Regiment del Rey in 1808

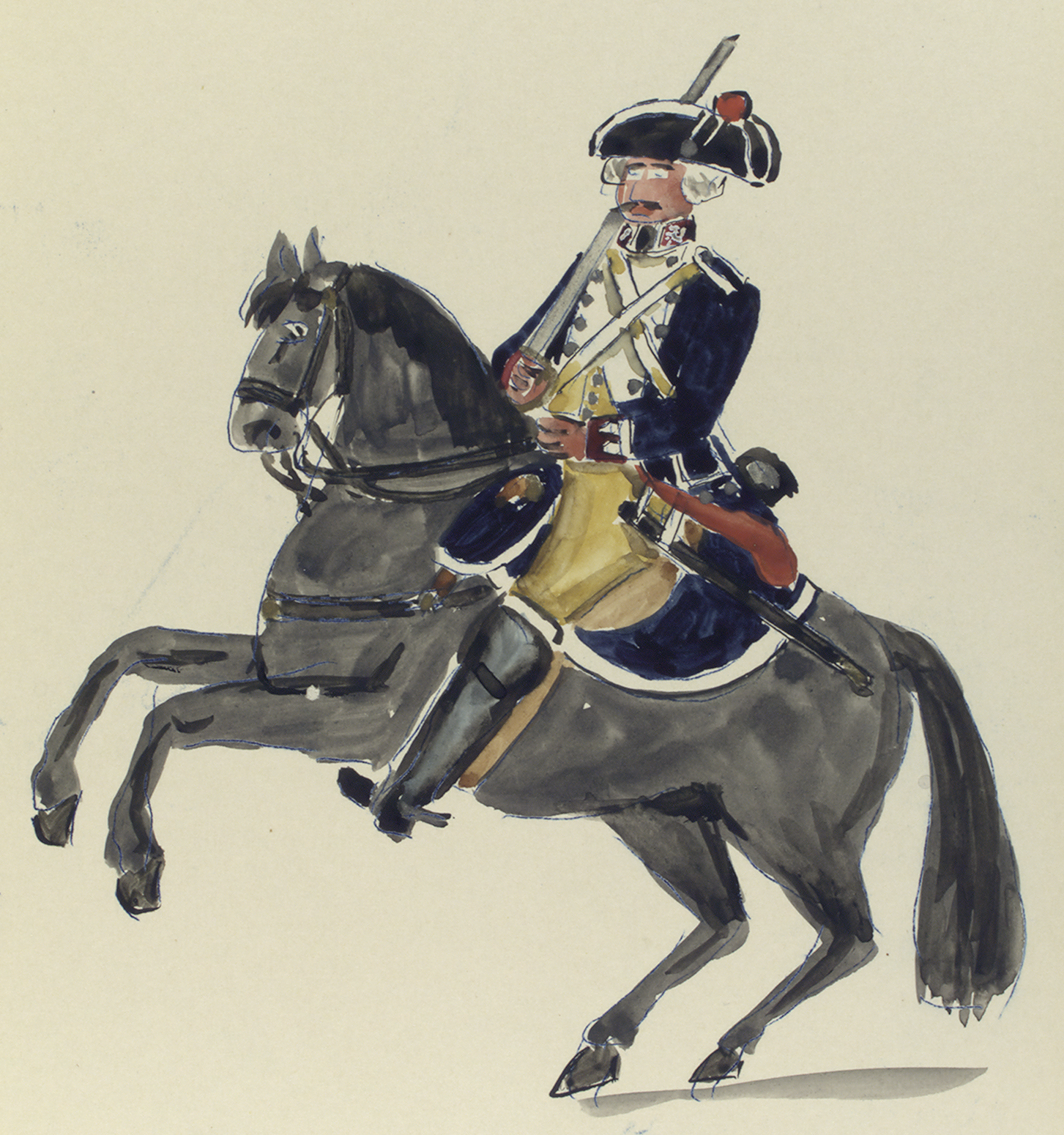
Trooper of the Montesa Cavalry Regiment in 1808

=== Dragoons ===
Uniforms c.1808
Regiment	Collar	Cuffs	Lapel	Buttons	Notes
King's Dragoon Regiment					
Queen's Dragoon Regiment					
Almansa Dragoon Regiment					
Pavia Dragoon Regiment					
Villaviciosa Dragoon Regiment					
Sagunto Dragoon Regiment					
Numantia Dragoon Regiment					
Lusitania Dragoon Regiment					

Gallery
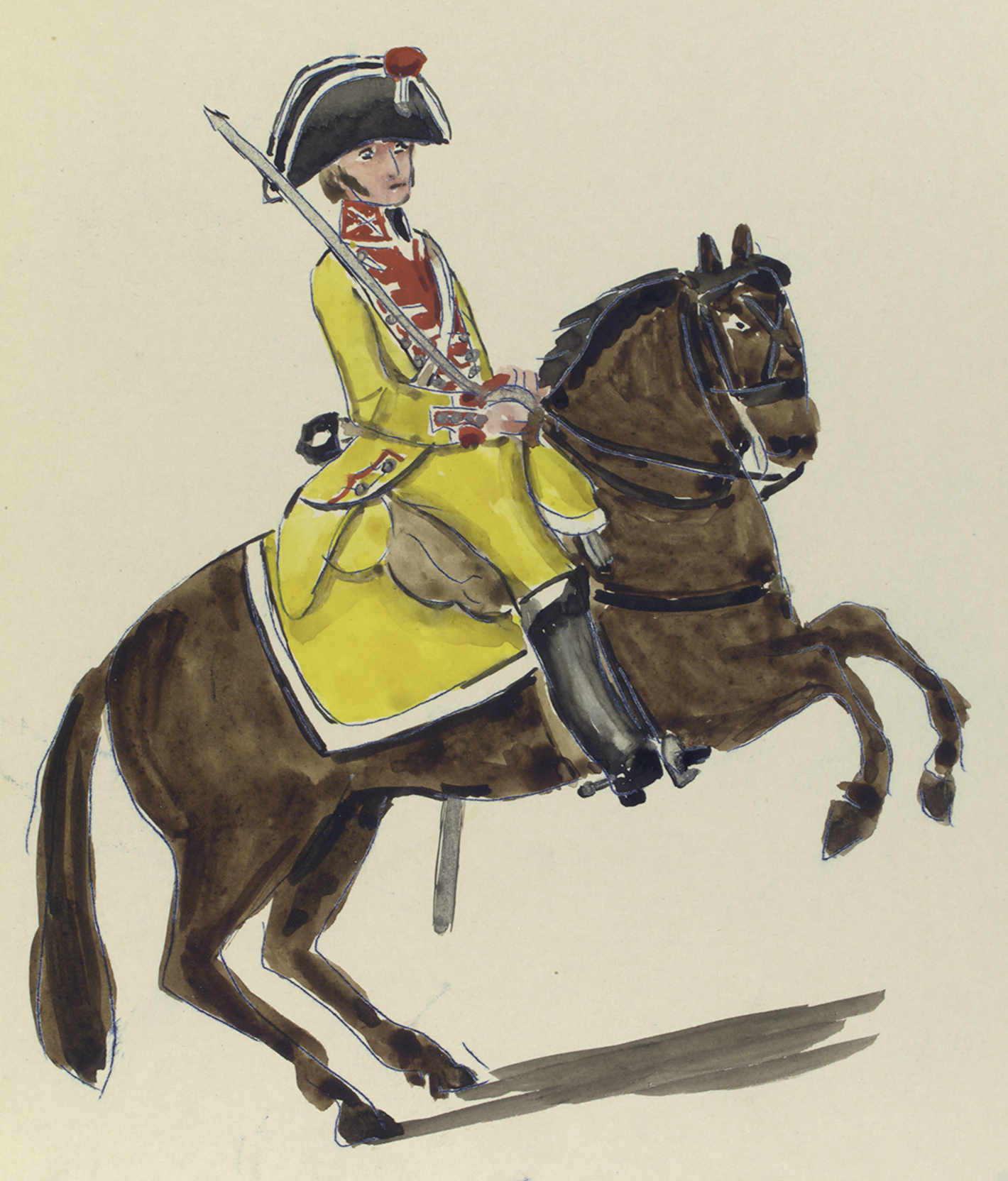
A trooper of the King's Dragoon Regiment in 1806

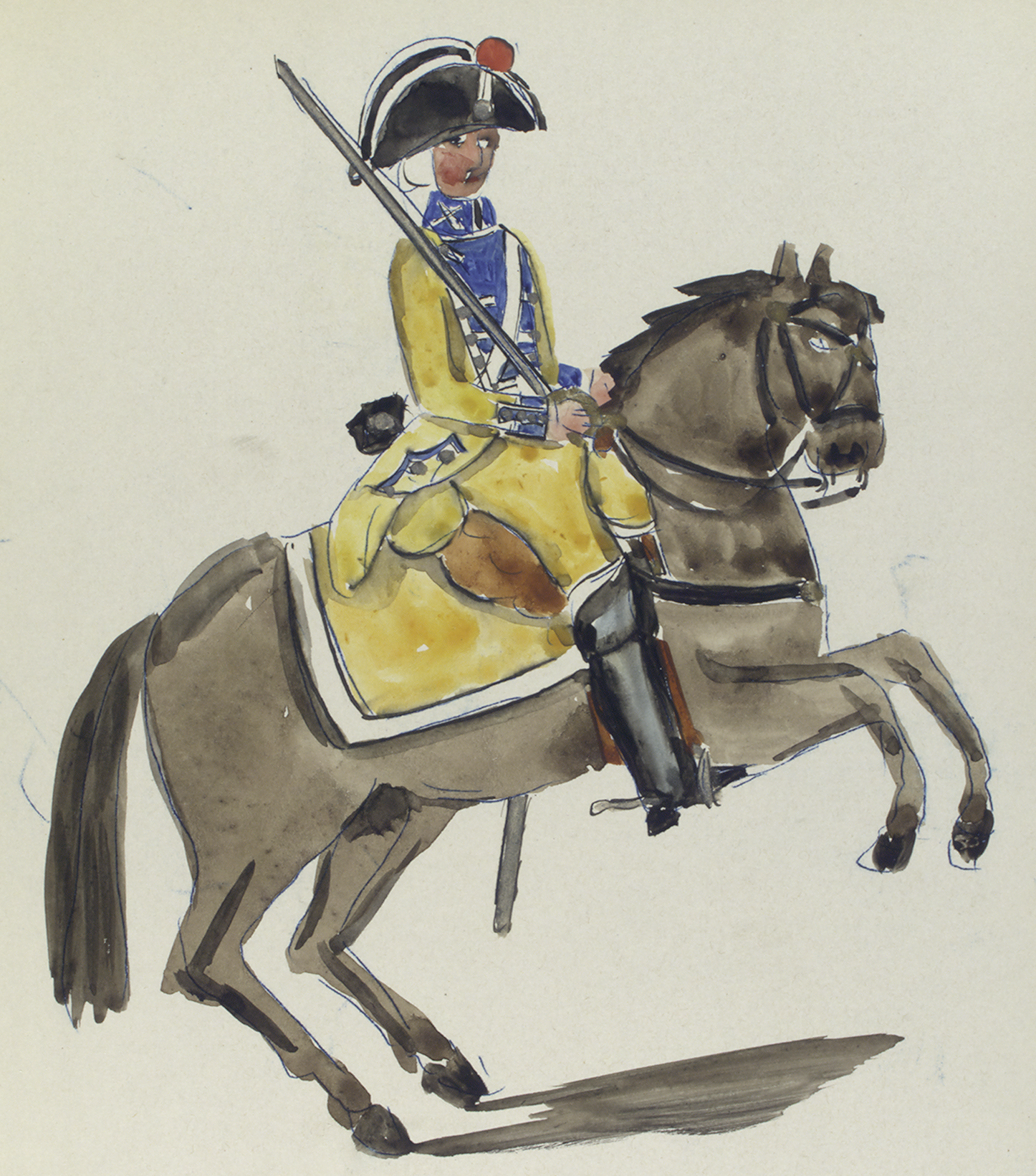
A trooper of the Almansa Dragoon Regiment in 1806

=== Mounted hunters ===
Uniforms c.1808
Regiment	Collar	Cuffs	Lapel	Notes
Olivenza Mounted Hunter Regiment				
Spanish Volunteer Hunters Regiment				

Gallery
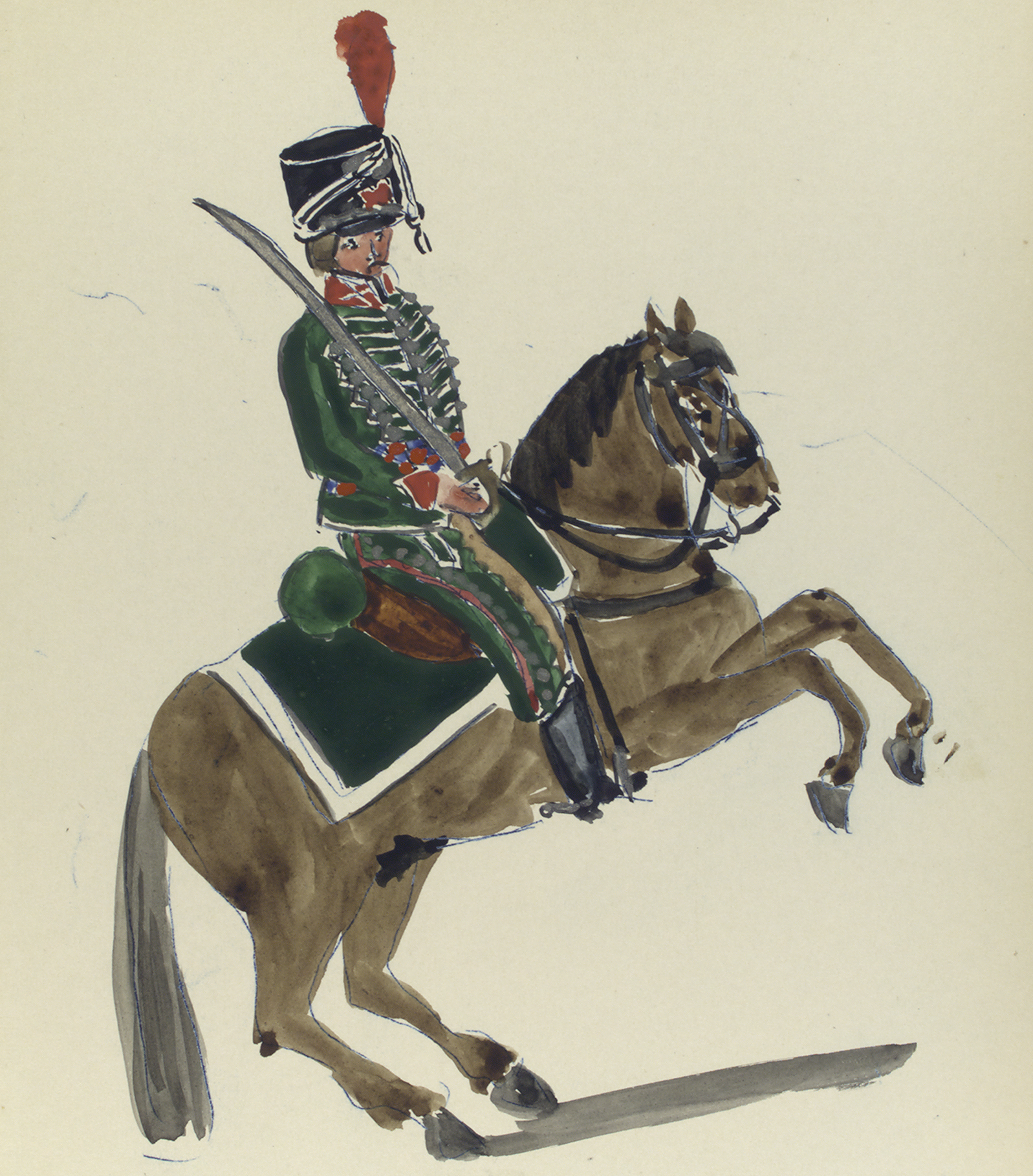
A trooper of the Olivenza Mounted Hunter Regiment in 1806

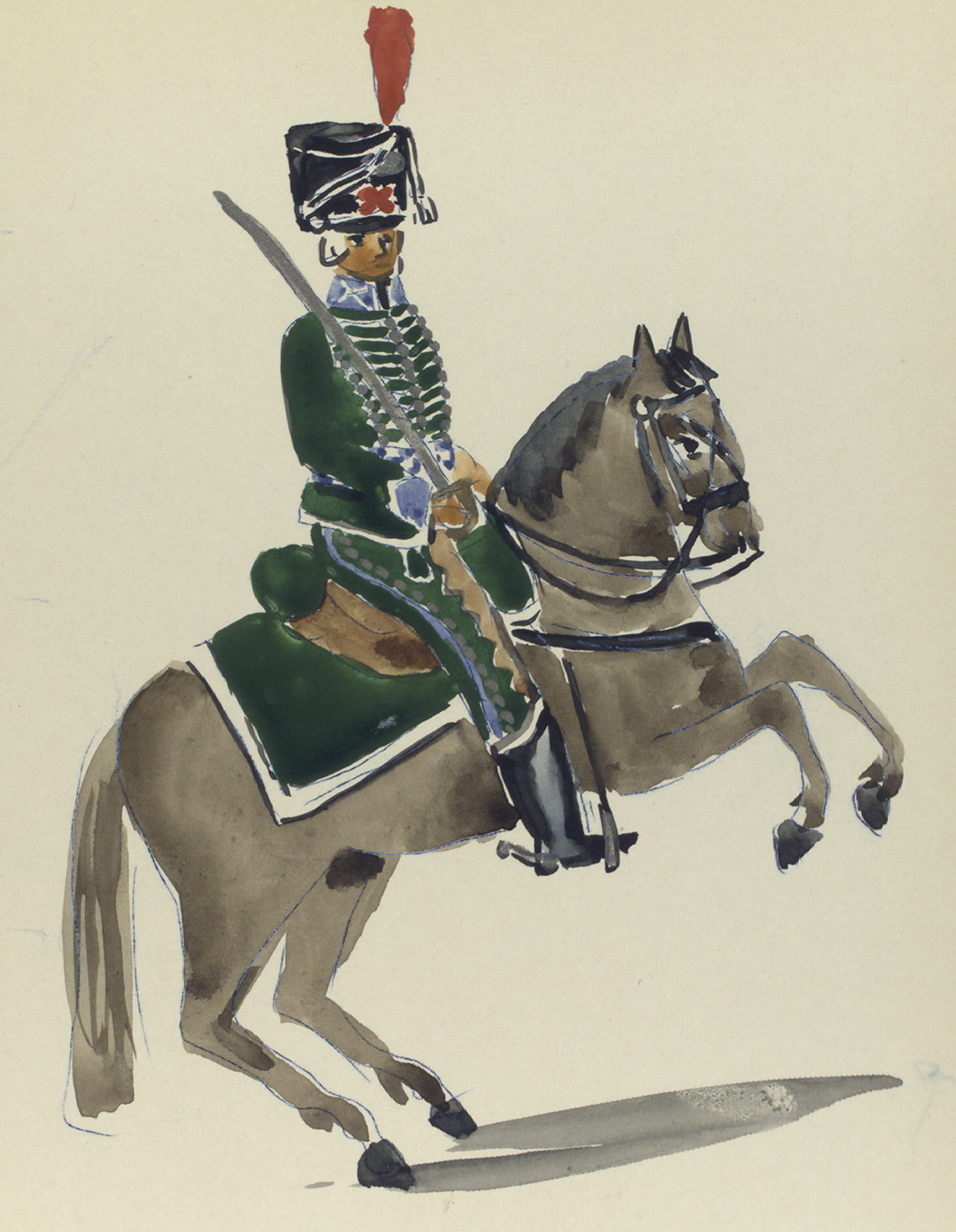
A trooper of the Spanish Volunteer Hunters Regiment in 1806

=== Hussar regiments ===
Uniforms c.1808
Regiment	Pelisse	Dolman	Breeches	Facings	Notes
Maria Luisa Hussar Regiment					
Spanish Hussar Regiment					

Gallery
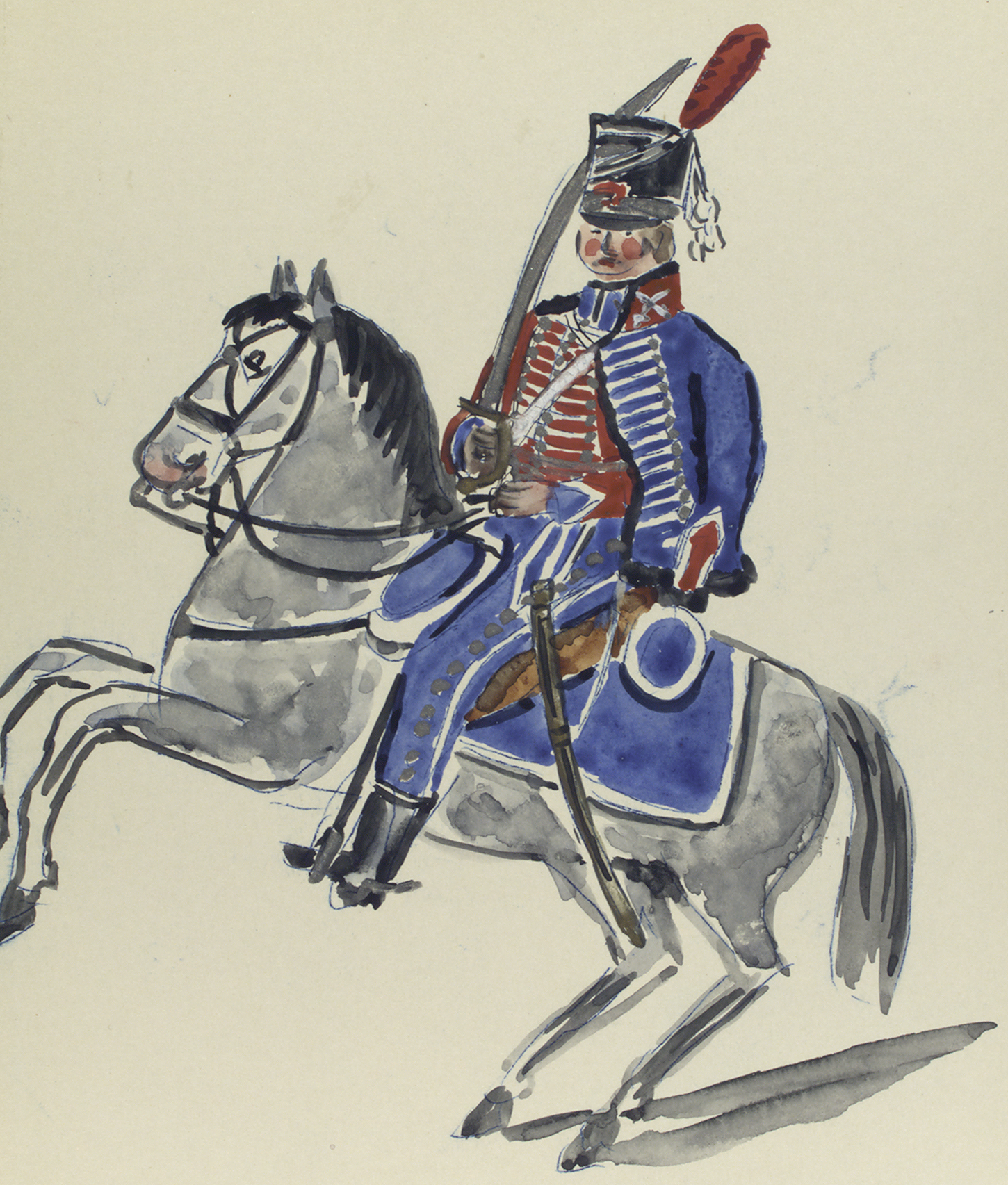
A trooper of the Maria Luisa Hussar Regiment in 1806

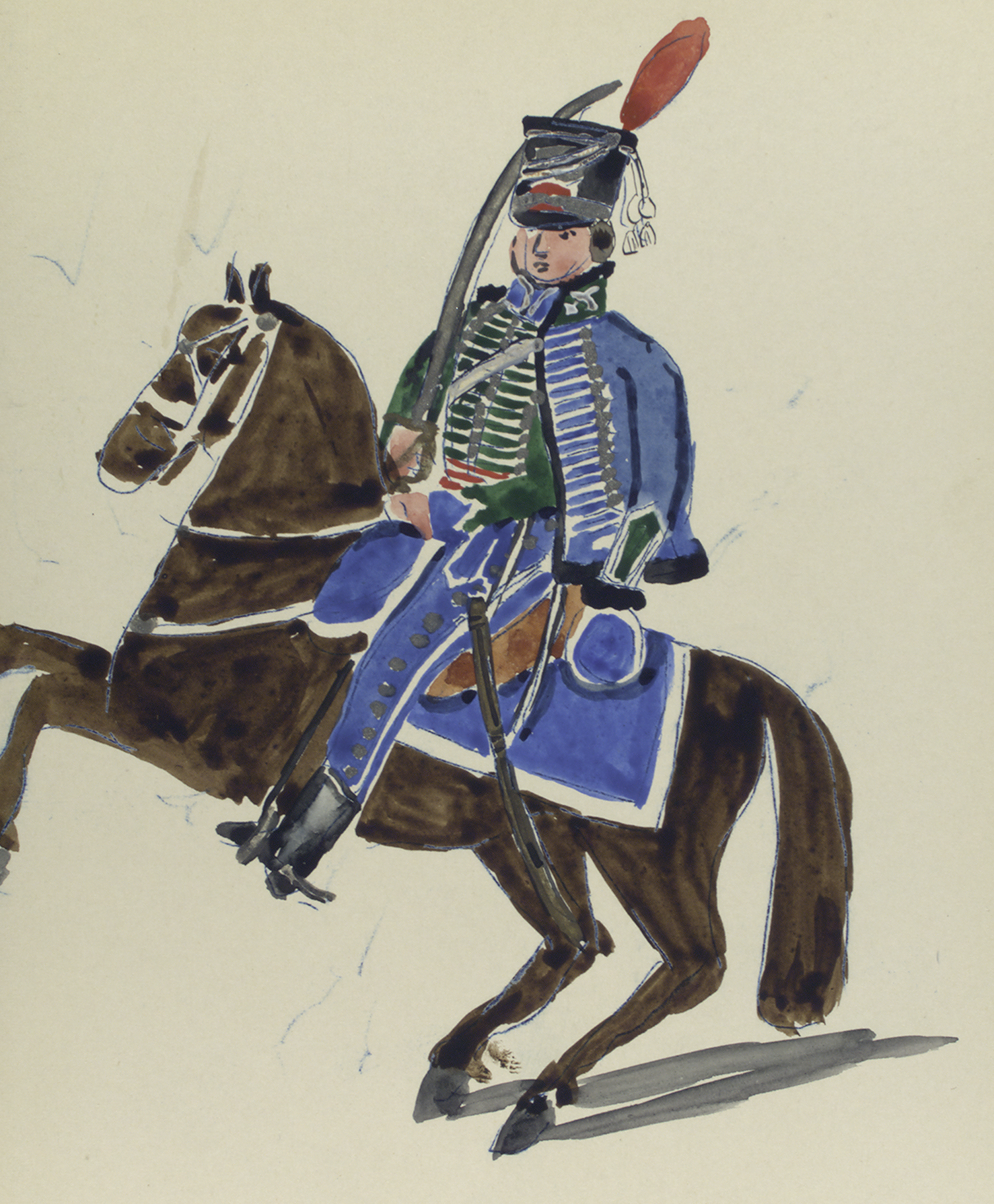
A trooper of the Spanish Hussar Regiment in 1806
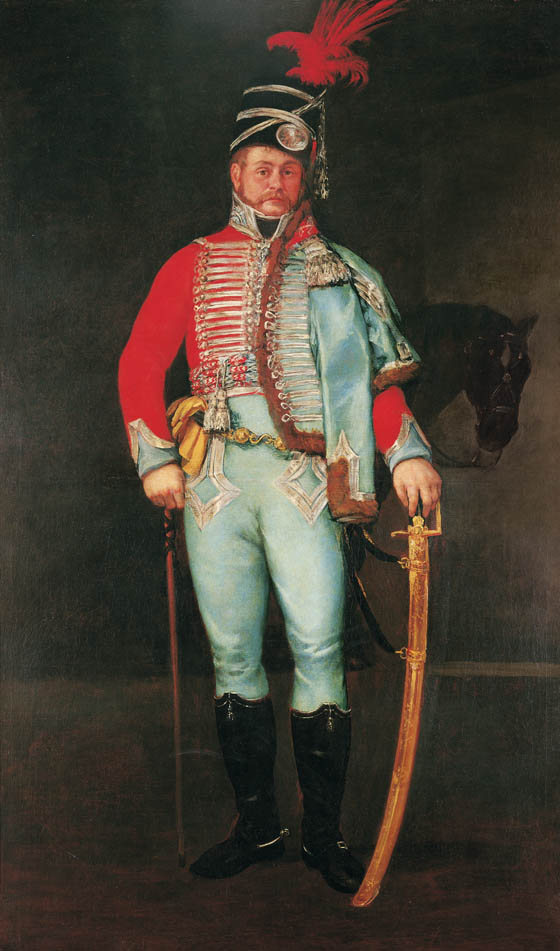
Portrait of Captain Adjutant Pantaleón Pérez de Nenín in the uniform of the Maria Luisa Hussar Regiment
