= Cavalry Regiment del Rey =

Cavalry regiment of the Spanish Army

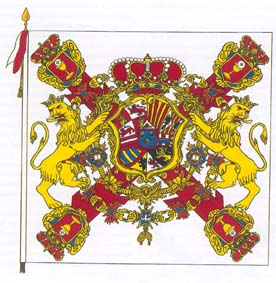
- The regimental colour in 1700
- Active: 1538–present
- Country: Spain
- Branch: Spanish Army
- Type: Regiment
- Role: Cavalry
- Size: 700 (1808)
- Engagements: Napoleonic Wars: Evacuation of the La Romana Division; Peninsular War; Battle of Talavera; Battle of Arzobispo; Battle of Ocaña; Spanish–American War: Battle of El Caney

Commanders
- Notable commanders: Coronel Don José Maria de Lastra; Teniente-Coronel Don Rafael de Valparda

The Cavalry Regiment del Rey (Spanish: Regimiento de Caballería del Rey) is a cavalry regiment of the Spanish Army. Tracing its roots back to 1538, it is the Spanish army's oldest cavalry regiment. The regiment distinguished itself on several occasions during the Peninsular War. They are best known for their charge at the Battle of Talavera where they dealt the decisive blow against a German division under Jean François Leval.

== History ==
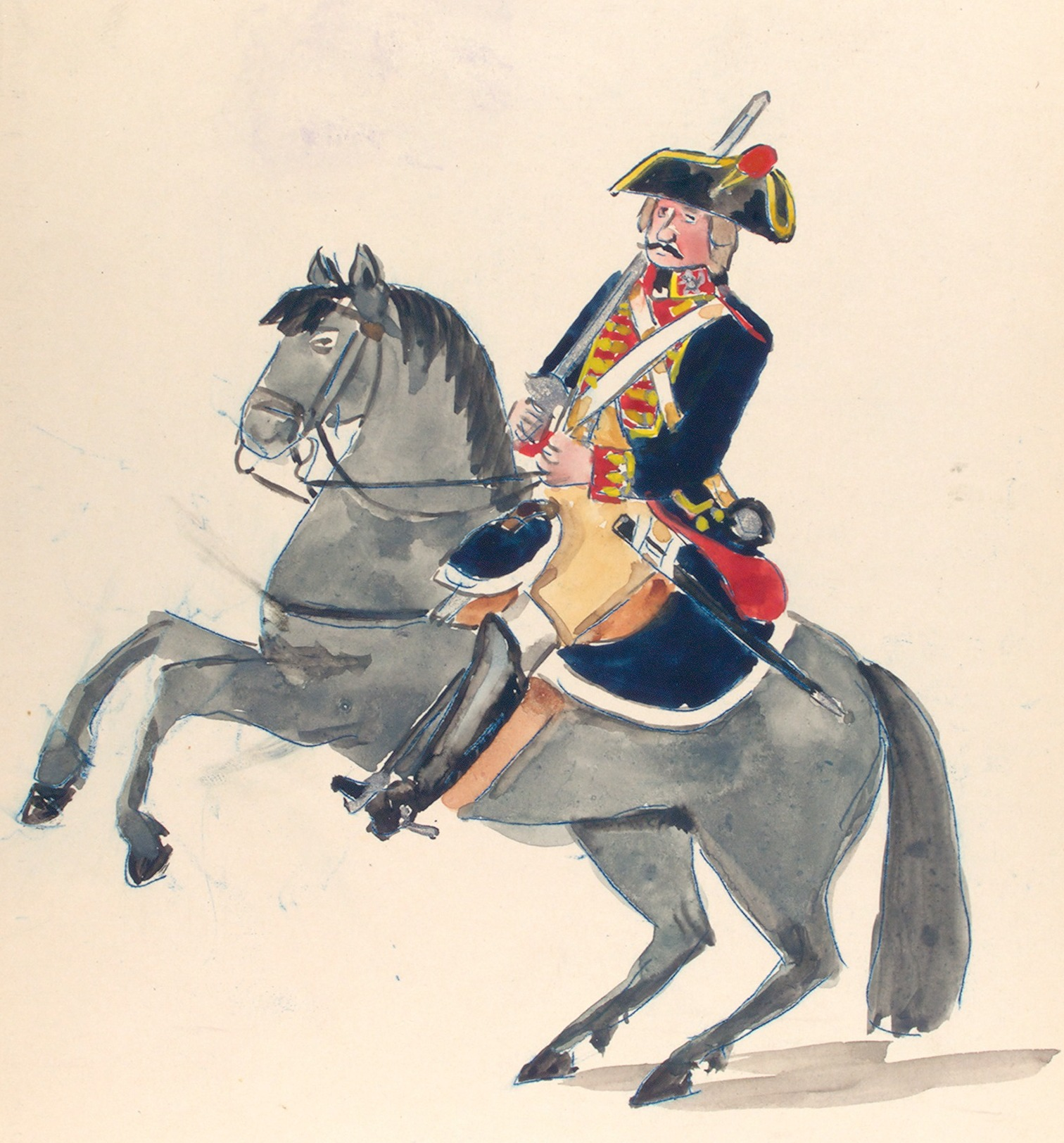
Illustration of a regimental trooper in 1806

The Cavalry Regiment del Rey is Spain's oldest cavalry regiment, founded in 1538 under the reign of King Charles I of Spain, and as such bore the title The King's in the Spanish Army. During the Napoleonic era it was considered as one of the best Spanish regiments and it distinguished itself during the Spanish War of Independence, frequently being commented as performing very well in those years. In 1807 the regiment was assigned to Marquis de La Romana's Division of the North and the following year was able to return to Spain to fight against the French invasion.

=== Peninsular War ===
Upon arrival in Cantabria the cavalrymen marched to Extremadura where they were to collect horses, thus avoiding the defeat that fell upon La Romana's division at Espinosa de los Monteros. In 1809 the regiment would see much action while serving in Gregorio García de la Cuesta's Army of Extremadura, as part of General Juan Henestrosa's 1st Cavalry Division. It would fight at the Battle of Talavera, where they captured four French cannons and would be highly praised in Cuesta's report.

Its intrepid attack and destruction of a column of enemy infantry. Its colonel, Don José Maria de Lastra, was wounded during the charge and was succeeded with valour by lieutenant colonel Don Rafael Valparda. Captain Don Francisco de Sierra gained much distinction by taking a cannon while vanquishing its defenders; Ensign Don Pablo de Cataneo, of 16 years of age, slew four Frenchmen, and all officers and men of the regiment manifested proof of its valour and discipline.

The regiment would see action again at the Battle of Arzobispo, under the command of the Duke of Alburquerque, in which the cannons that the regiment had captured at Talavera were lost.

Later on in 1809 the regiment saw action in the Army of La Mancha under General Juan Carlos de Aréizaga, in General Juan de Bermuy's 1st Cavalry Division, at the Battle of Ocaña. The battle was a disaster for the Spanish Army as large numbers of the well trained pre-1808 veterans had been killed or captured, leaving the army with a great need for more trained men; the defeat also leading to the second Spanish attempt to re-capture Madrid being halted.

=== Post-Peninsular War ===
In 1815, a review from the Estado Militar de España placed the regiment as one of the units that were to remain as part of the regular army after the Peninsular War ended. This review was normally done annually, however due to the chaotic state of Spanish politics during the war it had been difficult to make a full review of the Spanish Army until peace was made.

In 1898 the regiment saw service in the Spanish–American War in Cuba, around the main area of the conflict, Santiago de Cuba. They fought in the Battle of El Caney under General Joaquín Vara del Rey.

== Uniform ==
During the Spanish War of Independence the unit wore a blue coat with scarlet cuffs, collar, lapels, turnbacks, gold piping and buff breeches; a black bicorn laced gold with a golden cockade holder was worn as headwear.

In 1898 the regiment had a uniform of a light blue dolman with black Austrian loops and white metal buttons; red collar and cuffs, and red trousers with a light blue stripe. They had also, after the Napoleonic Wars adopted the use of a cuirass and helmet, of steel with brass ornamentation. However, in the colonies of Cuba, Puerto Rico, Guam, the Las Carolinas Islands and the Philippines they wore the Rayadillo colonial uniform with red collar and cuffs and Leopoldina shakos with the Spanish red and yellow cockade.
