= Spanish Army (Peninsular War) =

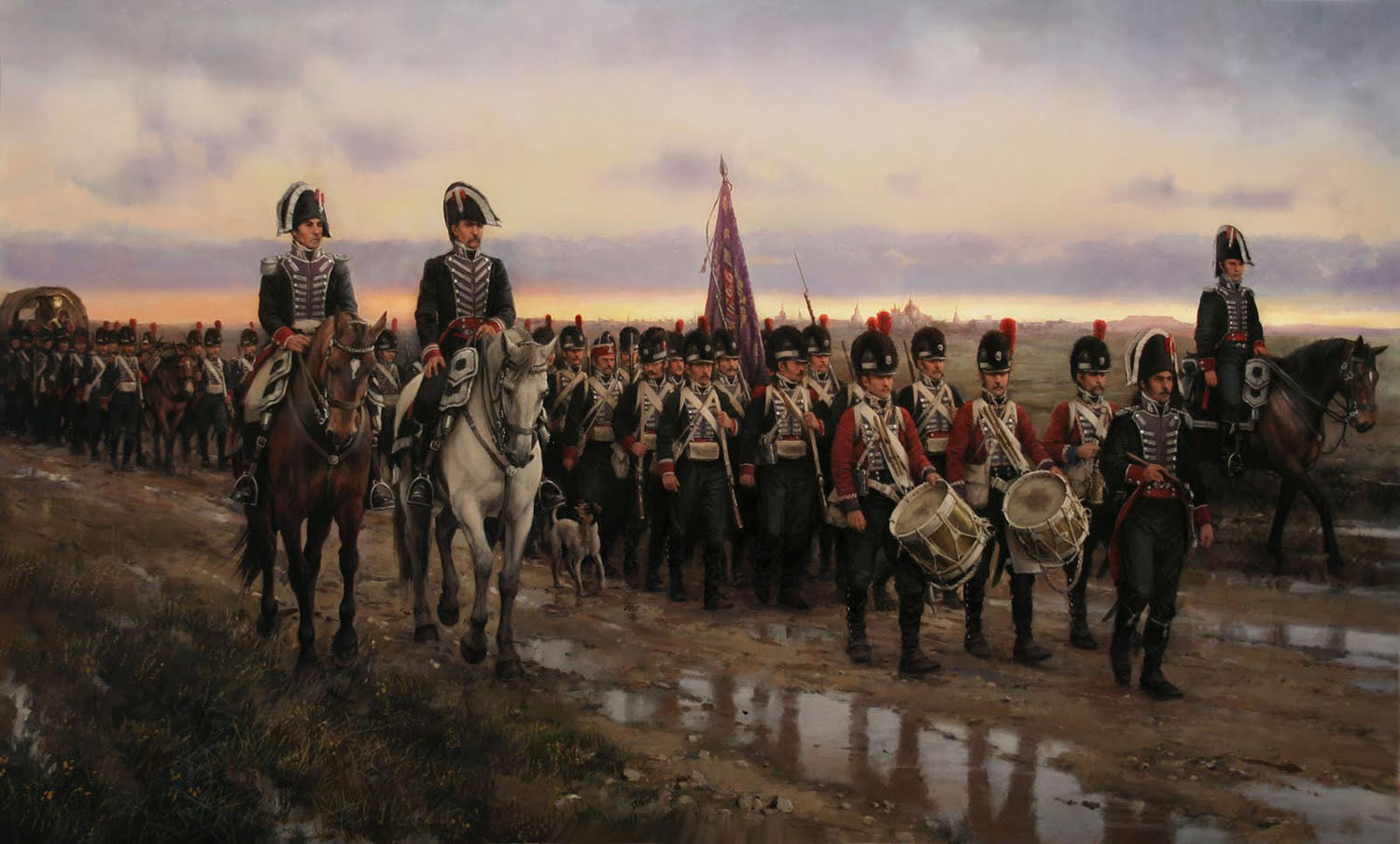
A Spanish Army column during the Peninsular War

The Spanish Army of the Peninsular War refers to the Spanish military units that fought against the French Imperial Army during a period which coincided with what is also termed the Spanish War of Independence (Spanish: Guerra de la Independencia Española). In June 1808, the Spanish Army numbered 136,824 men and officers (including 30,527 militiamen assigned to provincial battalions). This figure also includes General La Romana's 15,000-man Division of the North, then garrisoned in Denmark. (Note: By contrast, French troops in Spain, including the 48,204 which entered the country June–August 1808, that is, after the outbreak of the war, numbered 165,103. (Oman, 1902). By 1 February the following year, that figure had increased to 288,551 French troops, of whom 193,978 were "Présents sous les armes" (Present at Arms). (Oman, 1903).)

In 1808, the first year of the armed conflict against the French Army, at least two hundred new Spanish infantry regiments were created, most of which consisted of only one battalion. These regular troops and local militias which, in the case of Catalonia, ran to several thousand well-organised miquelets, or somatenes, who had already proved their worth in the Catalan revolt of 1640 and in the War of the Spanish Succession (1701–1714), were supplemented throughout the country by the guerrilla and were a constant source of harassment to the French army and its lines of communication. So much so that, between the new year and the middle of February 1809, General St. Cyr calculated that his troops had used up 2,000,000 cartridges in petty skirmishes with the miqueletes between Tarragona and Barcelona.

In several battles, such as the Battle of Salamanca, the Spanish Army fought side-by-side with their allies of the Anglo-Portuguese Army, led by General Wellesley (who would not become the Duke of Wellington until after the Peninsular War was over).

== Background ==
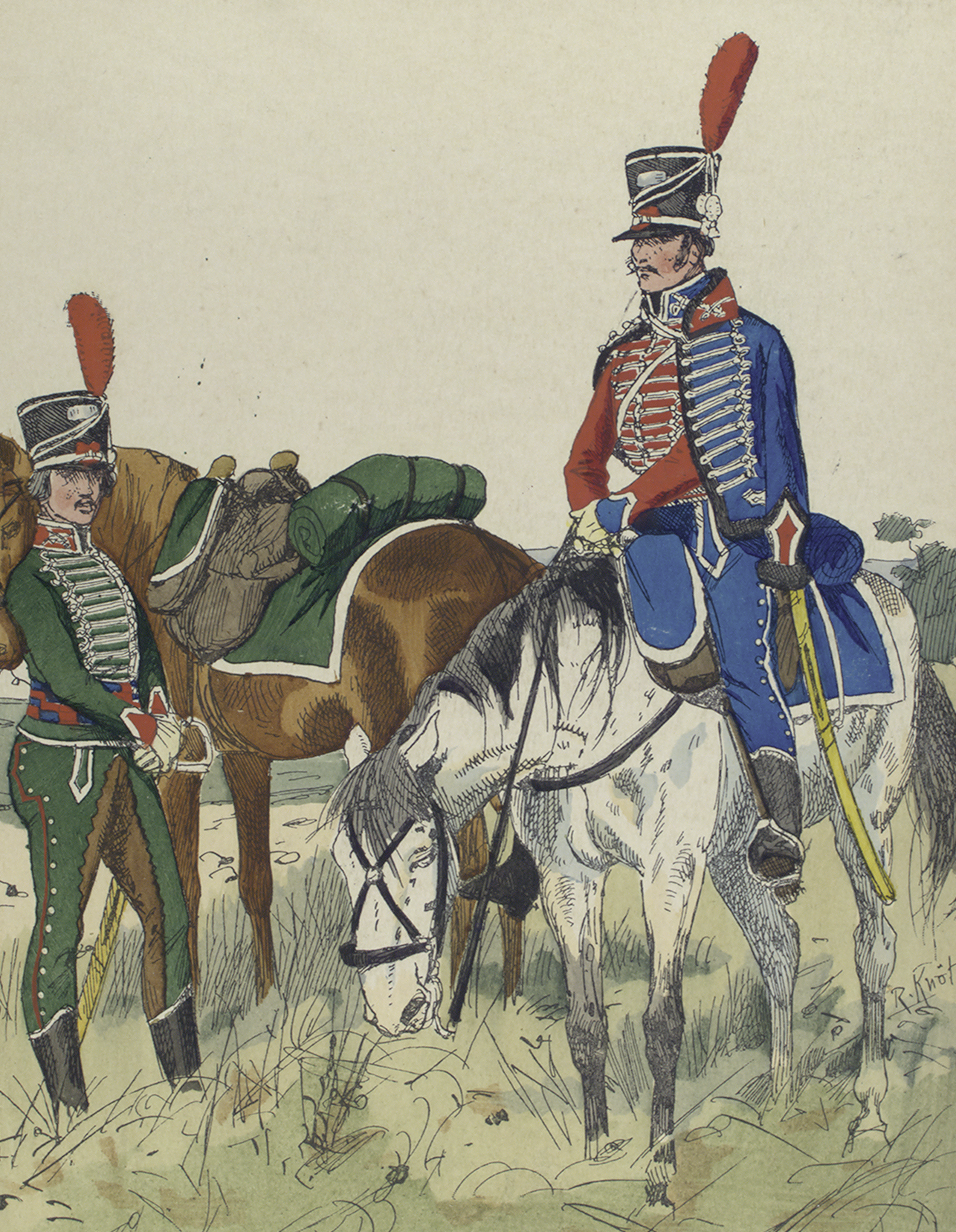
Two Spanish cavalryman in 1806

In volume 1 of his A History of the Peninsular War, 1807-1809 (1902), British military historian Charles Oman responds to many of the contemporary criticisms by Wellington and others regarding "the state and character of the Spanish army" as follows: "Only when we know its difficulties can we judge with fairness of its conduct, or decide upon its merits and shortcomings".

In the spring of 1808, Charles IV's land forces consisted of 131,000 men, of whom 101,000 were regulars and 30,000 militia embodied in the regular army. Due to the Anglo-Spanish War (1796–1808), these militias had been under arms since 1804 in the greater part of the garrisons of the seaports of Spain, to protect them against possible descents of English expeditions. Of the regular army, 15,000 men, the picked regiments of the army under Marquis of La Romana, were in Denmark at Napoleon's request. As Oman points out, "There remained therefore only 86,000 regulars within the kingdom. A very cursory glance down the Spanish army-list of 1808 is sufficient to show that this force was far from being in a satisfactory condition for either offensive or defensive operations".

Of these, there were ten foreign corps numbering some 13,000 men, including the six regiments of Swiss mercenaries—over 10,000 bayonets—and three Irish regiments: Hibernia, Irlanda, and Ultonia which, in 1808, had only 1,900 men under arms, instead of the 5,000 which they should have produced. However, Spain's history of using foreign troops was evidenced by the long list of foreign surnames among the leading figures of the day: Blake, the two O'Donnells, (Note: Although Oman refers two O'Donnells, there were in fact three brothers who fought during the Peninsular War: Henry O'Donnell, 1st Count of la Bisbal; Joseph O'Donnell and Charles O'Donnell.) Lacy, Sarsfield, O'Neill, O'Daly, Mahony, O'Donahue. As Oman points out, "none of them showed much strategical skill, yet their constant readiness to fight, which no series of defeats could tame, contrasts very well with the spiritless behaviour of a good many of the Spanish generals. No officer of Irish blood was ever found among the cowards, and hardly one among the traitors (O'Farrill and General Kindelan)". Other foreign-born or second-generation Spanish military commanders serving in Spain included Reding, Worster, Caldagues, Bassecourt, Coupigny, Rouvroy de Saint Simon, Schepeler, and Carlos de Witte. While many of those of Irish descent were Jacobite exiles, those of French descent were Royalists.

=== Treaty of Fontainebleau ===
Under the terms of the Treaty of Fontainebleau, which divided the Kingdom of Portugal and all Portuguese dominions between France and Spain, Spain agreed to augment, by three Spanish columns (numbering 25,500 men), the 28,000 troops General Junot was already leading through Spain to invade Portugal. Crossing into Spain on 12 October 1807, Junot started a difficult march through the country, finally entering Portugal on 19 November.

The three Spanish columns were as follows:

- General Carrafa's 9,500 men were to assemble at Salamanca and Ciudad Rodrigo and cooperate with Junot's main force.
- General Francisco Solano's column of 9,500 soldiers, which was to advance from Badajoz to capture Elvas and its fortress, invaded Portugal on 2 December 1807.
- General Taranco's 6,500 troops occupied Porto on 13 December. The general died the following January, and on 6 June 1808, when news of the rebellion in Spain reached Porto, the new commander of the garrison, General Belestá, arrested the French governor, General Quesnel, and his 30-man dragoon escort and joined the armies fighting the French.

=== Spring 1808 ===
In the spring of 1808, Spain's army consisted of 131,000 men, of whom 101,000 were regulars and 30,000 militia. Most of the militias formed part of the garrisons of the country's seaports, which at that early stage of the conflict had needed to be protected against English expeditions.

However, since Bonaparte had requested a strong division for use in the north of Europe, not all of the regular troops were stationed in Spain, and the Marquis of La Romana had been sent to the Baltic at the head of the Division of the North, numbering with 15,000 men, the picked regiments of the army, leaving only 86,000 regulars in Spain, made up of thirty-five regiments of troops of the line, of three battalions each, and twelve single-battalion regiments of light infantry, and if all of these had been up to the proper establishment of 840 men, the total would have amounted to 98,000 bayonets. By way of example, many of the corps in the interior of Spain were grossly under-manned: e.g. the regiment of Estremadura had only 770 men between its three battalions, that of Cordova 793, and the regiment of Navarre 822, that is, only around 250 men to the battalion instead of the proper 840.

As for the militia, these totalled forty-three battalions, which were named after the towns in which they had been raised —Badajoz, Lugo, Alcazar, and so forth. In general, their ranks were much fuller than those of the regular regiments—only two of these battalions had fewer than 550 bayonets.

=== British aid ===
After being shattered in the initially successful 1808 French invasion, from thereon the Spanish Army was heavily dependent on aid from Britain to sustain its war effort. Part of this came in the form of cash subsidies to pay soldiers' wages, which averaged just over £1 million per year from 1808 to 1814; however this amount was relatively small, as even Portugal's larger £1.5 million annual subsidy was only large enough to pay about 57% of the soldiers of the Portuguese army (the costs for the other 43% was raised by Lisbon), itself about a third the size of the Spanish one throughout the war. More important were direct shipments of equipment, dispatched in 13,500 individual voyages in 400 convoys during the six-year period (including supplies for Portugal). Between May 1808 and May 1809 alone, British shipments to the Spanish Army included 200,277 muskets, 155 artillery pieces, 39,000 set of accoutrements, 61,391 swords, 79,000 polearms, 40,000 tents, 92,100 uniforms (with shoes and hats), and half a million yards of linen and wool, along with £1.4 million in cash. Aid continued to flow through the rest of 1809 and 1810. By 1811 official British policy was to provide for the arms, clothing, and other equipment for 47% of the Spanish Army, 42,000 troops out of an army of 90,000 (excluding guerillas, who also got aid on a more haphazard basis). After declining in 1810-1811, from 1812 Britain significantly stepped up material aid to Spain, with 100,000 muskets (compared to 40,000 in 1811) and tens of thousands of swords sent from April 1812 to March 1813, plus uniforms and camp equipage for 100,000 men, plus artillery and miscellaneous goods like cavalry saddles. By 1814, the Spanish Army had increased to 154,000 men (again, excluding guerrillas), of whom the British were responsible for the requirements of 50,000 or 32% of the army. Outfitting the rest fell to Spain itself, which continued to manufacture weapons, clothing, and other relevant items.

== May – November 1808 ==
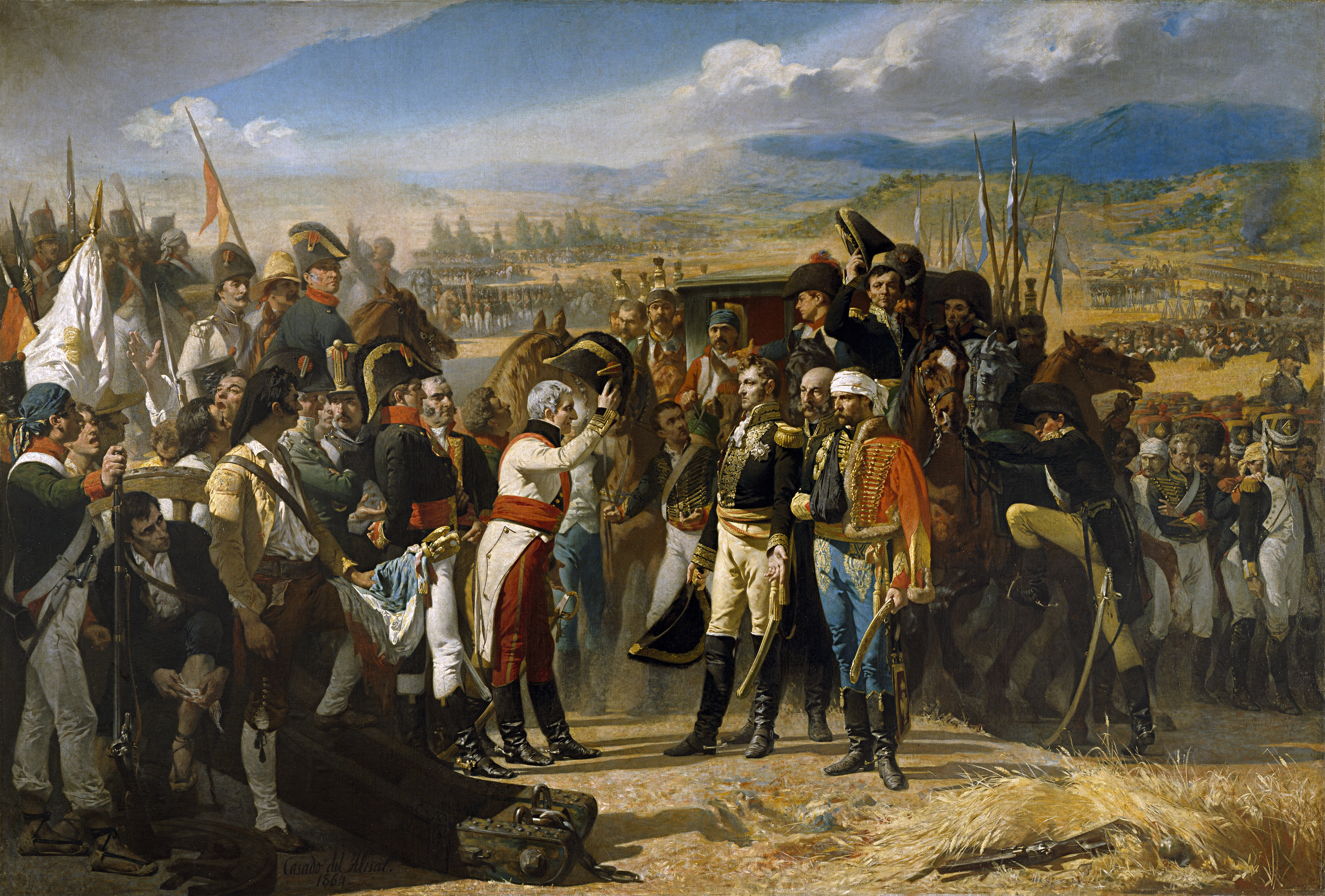
1864 painting of the Battle of Bailén

The jubilation following General Castaños' mid-July victory at Bailén was short-lived, and the following month General Merlin's sacking of Bilbao, on 16 August 1808, caused much popular discontent throughout the country, which was aimed specifically at the Juntas and the generals.

A war council was convened on 5 September, attended by Generals Cuesta; Castaños; Llamas; Lapeña; the Duque del Infantado, representing Blake; and another officer (unknown) representing Palafox. Cuesta, as the senior general, attempted to persuade Castaños to join him in leading a military government separated from the Juntas, but Castaños refused. Then, having tried, to no avail, to persuade his colleagues to name him commander-in-chief, Cuesta stormed out of the meeting. Having taken matters into his own hands, he would later be arrested and relieved of his command, only to have it restored shortly afterwards.

On 10 November, the Junta Central published its manifesto, dated 28 October 1808, in which, among other declarations, it declared its intention of maintaining a force of 500,000 troops, together with 50,000 cavalry.

According to the manifesto, the existing diverse regiments and corps of the Spanish Army would be organised into four large corps, presided over by a Junta Central de Guerra (Central War Board), to be headed by Castaños, as follows:

=== Army of the Left (Ejército de la Izquierda) ===
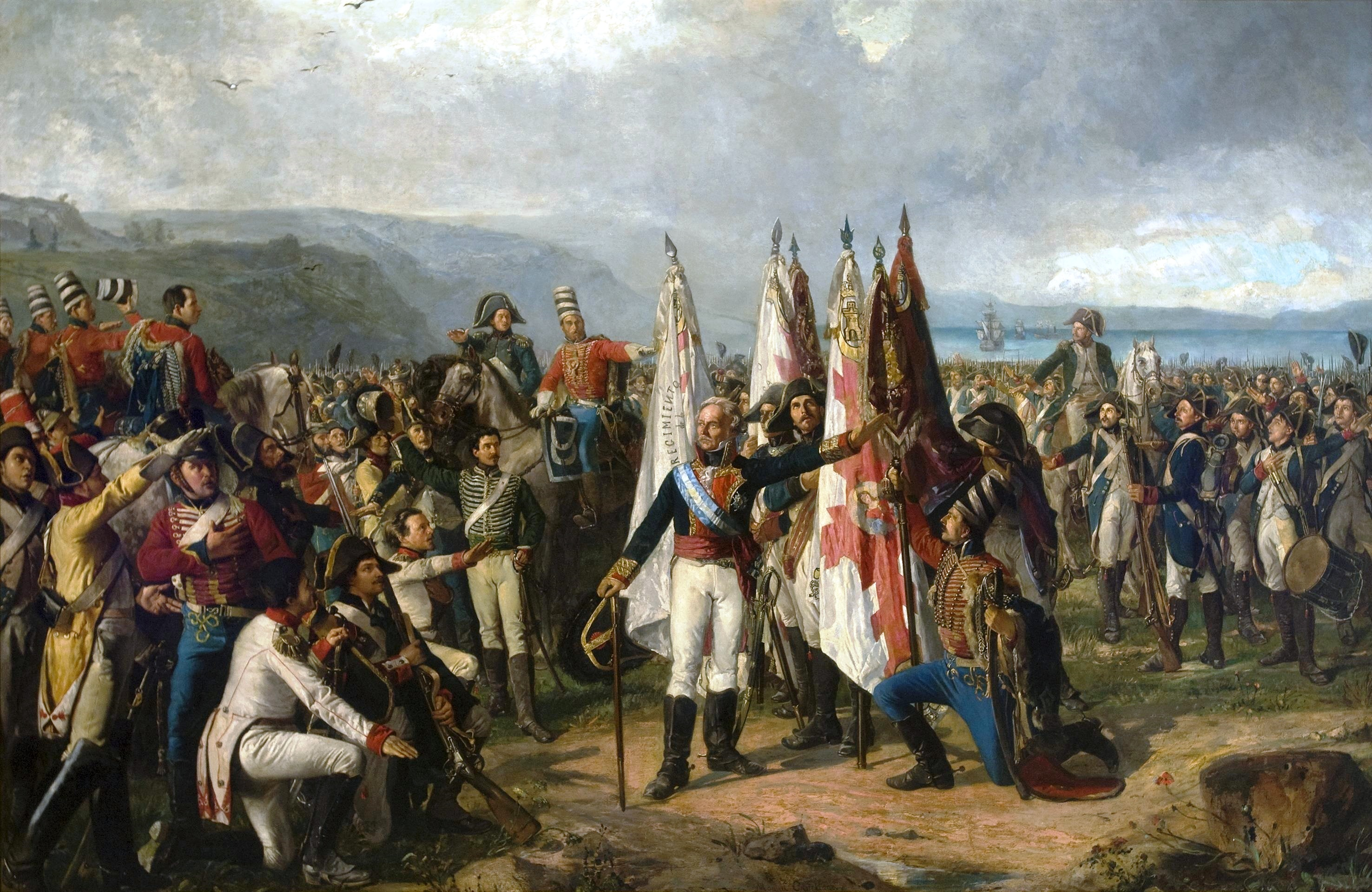
The evacuation of La Romana's division in 1808

Comprising the Army of Galicia (under Blake), the Army of Asturias (under Vicente María de Acevedo), and General Pedro Caro Sureda, 3rd Marquis de La Romana's men from Denmark, together with as many enlisted men they could raise from the Cantabrian mountains and the other mountainous regions they passed through.

=== Army of the Centre (Ejército del Centro) ===
According to Napier, in October 1808, the Army of the Centre had 27,000 men, including General Pignatelli's division of ten thousand Castilian infantry, plus one thousand five hundred cavalry and fourteen guns; General Grimarest's 2nd Division of Andalusia, with five thousand men; General Lapeña's 4th Division of five thousand infantry.

On the other hand, according to Oman (1902), with access to "detailed official figures", (Note: "It will be noted that all the numbers given are much larger than those attributed by Napier (i. 504) to the Spanish armies. I have worked from detailed official figures, the greater part of which seem perfectly trustworthy". (Oman, 1902).) in October–November 1808, Castaños's Army of the Centre had 51,000 men, of whom only about 42,000 were on the Ebro: the remaining 9,000 were in or about Madrid, and were incorporated in San Juan's Army of Reserve. Its divisions were as follows:

- 1st Division (about 8,500 men), under Conde de Villariezo: Of its fifteen battalions, nine were detached to the rear, in or about Madrid, and were not present on the Ebro.
- 2nd Division (about 6,000 men), under General Grimarest
- 3rd Division (about 6,500 men), under General Rengel: Of its thirteen battalions, four were detached to the rear, and were not present on the Ebro.
- 4th Division (about 7,500 men), under General Lapeña
- 5th Division (about 8,000 men), under General Roca [vice General Llamas]: One regiment, under General Llamas, was left at Aranjuez as guard to the Junta.
- Army of Castile (about 11,000 men), under General Pignatelli [after 30 October, General Cartaojal]. This army, with many raw levies, ceased to exist when Castaños removed Pignatelli from his post for having retreated when faced by Ney's troops at Logroño. (Note: Four of its corps, mainly regular battalions, were made into a detached brigade under Cartaojal on 30 October: the others (except the Volunteers of Benavente in garrison at Burgos) were dispersed among the Andalusian divisions of Grimarest, Lapeña, and Llamas (Oman, 1902).)
- Cavalry (about 3,500 horse). (Note: Very few of the cavalry regiments had more than three squadrons at the front, some only one (Oman, 1902).)

The reformed army would be made up of the four divisions from Andalucia (under Castaños), together with those of Castile (under Cuesta), Extremadura and those of Valencia and Murcia that had entered Madrid under Llamas. It was hoped that the British forces would join this Army in the event that they decided to advance up towards France.

=== Army of the Right (Ejército de la Derecha) ===
Previously known as the Army of Catalonia (Ejército de Cataluña), the new army, under the orders of the newly appointed captain-general of Catalonia, Juan Miguel de Vives, numbered 19,857 men and 800 horse (although Napier put the figure at 36,000 troops, of which 22,000 infantrymen and 1,200 horse were stationed near Barcelona or headed towards the city). The army was composed of regular troops and migueletes from Catalonia, plus the divisions that had disembarked at Tarragona from Mallorca with Vives and those from Portugal and Estremadura, with a shipment of 20,000 new rifles, as well as their own arms, were commanded by generals Laguna and García Conde, respectively, and those sent from Granada, Aragón (a division under the Marquis of Lazán) and Valencia.

The first division, the Llobregat Division, was commanded by the Count of Caldagues and comprised 4,698 infantrymen and 400 horse, plus six cannon. The second division, the Horta Division, was commanded by Field Marshal Gregorio Laguna, with 2,164 troops, 200 horse and seven cannon. The third division, the San Cugat Division, was commanded by Colonel Gaspar Gomez de la Serna, with 2,458 troops, while the fourth division, the San Gerónimo de la Murta Division, was commanded by Colonel Francisco Milans and was made up of 3,710 migueletes.

The vanguard, under Brigadier Álvarez, was formed by the Ampurdan Division, numbering 6,000 troops and 100 horse, and was made up of the garrisons of Rosas and Gerona, together with miguletes and somatenes from Igualada, Cervera, Tarragona, Gerona and Figueras.

The Reserve, based at Vives's newly established headquarters at Martorell, comprised 777 line infantry, under General Garcia Conde; 80 hussars under Major-general Carlos de Witte and four cannon, under Colonel Juan de Ara. The commander of the engineers was Antonio Casanova.

=== The Army of the Reserve ===
The reserve would comprise Palafox, Saint March and O'Neill's Valencia division.

== Autumn Campaign (1809) ==
The Junta Central's Autumn Campaign was politically motivated, and despite Del Parque's victory at Tamames in October, the Spanish Army's subsequent defeats at the battles of Ocaña and Alba de Tormes led to the Junta's fall at the beginning of 1810.

The campaign was to be carried out by the Army of Estremadura, under the Duke of Alburquerque's much depleted force of 8,000 infantry and 1,500 cavalry, as he had had to transfer three divisions of infantry and twelve regiments of cavalry to reinforce the Army of La Mancha, under Venegas, and which, after its defeat at Almonacid, had been reduced to only 25,000 men.

The Army of La Mancha now comprising some 50,000 men, the Junta removed Venegas (who had taken over from Cartaojal, dismissed for his incompetence at the Battle of Ciudad Real in March) replacing him with Aréizaga, who was able to bring the force up to 48,000 infantry, 6,000 cavalry and 60 cannon, making it one of the largest forces Spain had ever created.

The Army of the Left which, in theory, was 50,000 strong (although only 40,000 of them actually took part in the campaign), was formed from La Romana's Army of Galicia, with Ballasteros’s Army of the Asturias and the Del Parque's troops. The latter was given command of this Army.

== 1811 ==
=== January ===
For much of the year, Spain's army would be as follows:

- 1st Army (Catalonia)
- 2nd Army (Valencia)
- 3rd Army (Murcia)
- 4th Army (Cádiz-Huelva)
- 5th Army (Extremadura)
- 6th Army (Asturias & Galicia)

=== September ===
For the latter part of the year, commands were assigned as follows:

- 1st Army (Lacy)
- 2nd Army (O'Donnell)
- 3rd Army (Mahy – Zayas)
- 4th Army (Ballesteros)
- 5th Army (Castaños)
- 6th Army (Santocildes)

== 1812–1814 ==
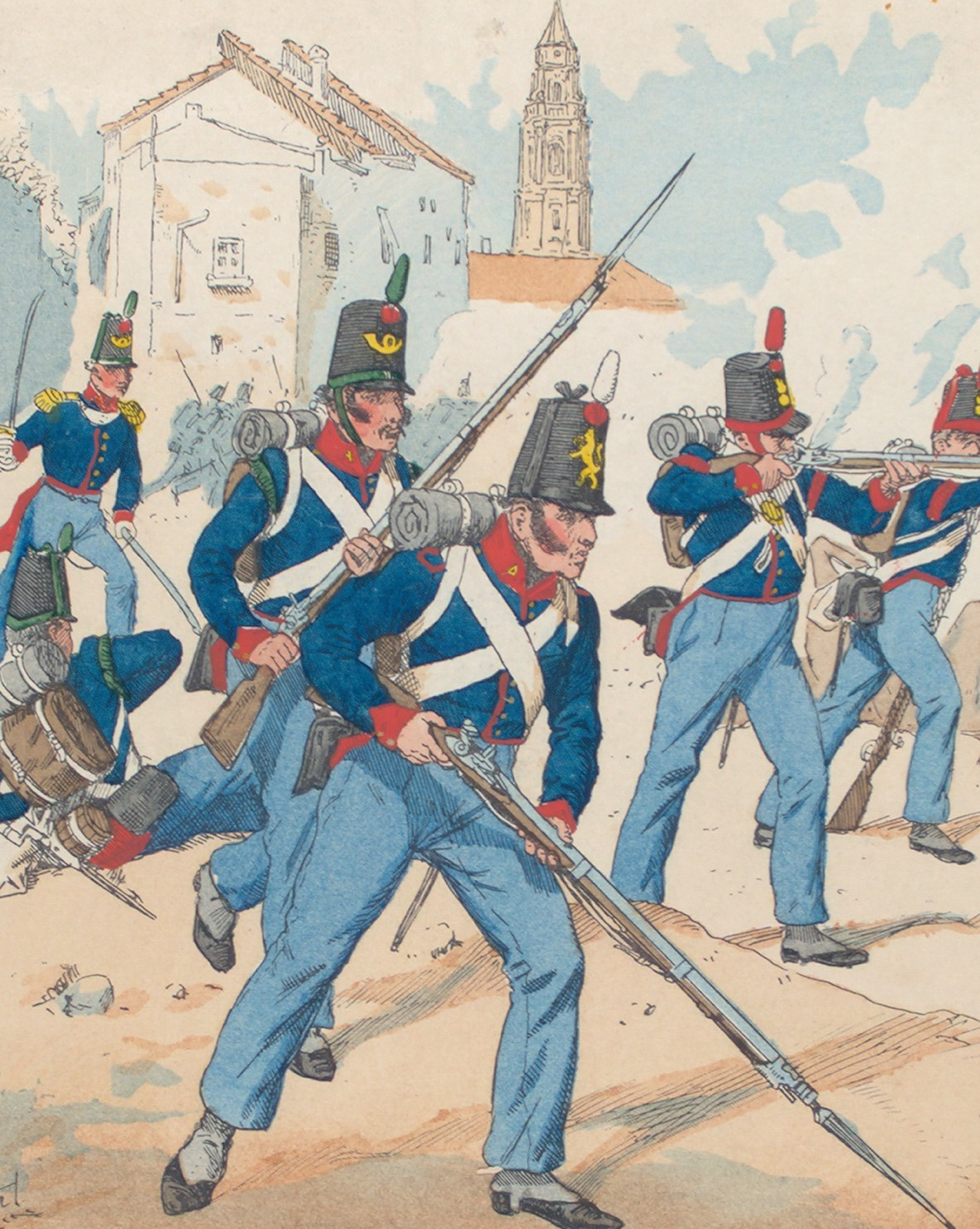
Spanish troops in 1812

On 22 September 1812, the Cortes named Wellington generalissimo (supreme commander) of the Spanish armies. The commander of the 4th Army, General Ballesteros, was arrested and relieved of his command in October 1812, and exiled for protesting Wellington's command and trying to instigate an uprising. By mid-1813, Spain's regular forces consisted of some 160,000 troops, around a third of which were fighting alongside Wellington's Anglo-Portuguese Army.

- 1st Army: By June 1813, the Army of Catalonia, now known, again, as the 1st Army, under General Copons, comprised 16,000 men. Pedro Agustin Giron, until then in command of the Army of the Centre, would be appointed commander of the Army of Catalonia that August. (Note: (in Spanish). "El 12 de agosto fue relevado del mando del cuarto ejército español el General Castaños, por haberle llamado las Córtes á desempeñar su plaza de Consejero de Estado, sucediéndole el Mariscal de Campo Manuel Freire, y destinado al ejército de Cataluña al de igual clase Don Pedro Agustin Giron, Comandante general del Centro. Castaños, que conoció el pretesto con que la Regencia le separaba del mando, escribió en estos términos al Ministro de la Guerra: 'Tengo la satisfacción de entregar al Mariscal de Campo Freire, sobre la frontera de Francia, el mando del ejército que he tomado en Aldea Gallega, delante de Lisboa.'" (Muñoz, 1833: p. 420.))
- 2nd Army: When Blake's Army of Valencia, now known as the Army of Murcia, surrendered to Marshal Suchet at Valencia, at the beginning of 1812, it comprised 28,000 men. Of these, some 7,000 were able to escape capture, and by June 1813, its new commander, General Elio, had over 30,600 troops under him.
- 3rd Army: The former Army of Murcia, now the Army of Andalusia, rose from some 5,500 men at the beginning of January 1812 to 12,600 men under the Duke del Parque in June 1813. By April 1814, the Prince of Anglona had 21,000 men under him.
- 4th Army (now Galicia): The 4th Army (whose previous commander, Ballesteros, had been relieved of his command in October 1812, and exiled for protesting Wellington's command), was now attached to Wellington's forces. In August 1813, Freire was promoted to general and succeeded Castaños, who had been called to the Cortes, in command of the 35,000 troops of the 4th Army.
- Army of the Reserve of Andalusia: under O'Donnell
- Army of the Reserve of Galicia: under Lacy

== Irregular troops ==
Following on from other related decrees, on 17 April 1809, the Junta Central issued orders for all able-bodied patriots to join the Corso Terrestre (literally, "Land Corsairs"). By the following August, the Corso Terrestre of Navarra, initially comprising fifteen men, led by Francisco Xavier Mina, had carried out a series of successful ambushes, and soon consisted of 1,200 infantry troops and 150 cavalry, now known as the Primero de Voluntarios de Navarra ("First Volunteers of Navarra"). By November 1811, Juan Palarea Blanes, known as "El Médico", based in La Mancha, had raised both the Husares Francos Numantinos, a light cavalry unit, and the Cazadores Francos Numantinos, a light infantry unit, both of which were incorporated into the 4th Army in 1813, with the cavalry unit later joining Espoz y Mina's division in Navarre.

By summer 1811, French commanders had deployed 70,000 troops solely to keep lines open between Madrid and the border with France, figure which, by 1812, had grown to 200,000 troops, of a total of 350,000 French soldiers in Iberia, simply protecting lines of supply rather than serving as front-line troops. A list drawn up that same year refers to 22 guerrilla bands in Spain, numbering some 38,520 men.

== Opinion of Charles Oman (1902) ==
In volume 1 of his A History of the Peninsular War, 1807-1809 (1902), British military historian Charles Oman refers to the situation and circumstances of the Spanish Army as follows:

... The Duke of Wellington in his dispatches, and still more in his private letters and his table-talk, was always enlarging on the folly and arrogance of the Spanish generals with whom he had to co-operate, and on the untrustworthiness of their troops. Napier, the one military classic whom most Englishmen have read, is still more emphatic and far more impressive, since he writes in a very judicial style, and with the most elaborate apparatus of references and authorities. [...] Not only was the Spanish army indifferently officered, but even of such officers as it possessed there were not enough. In the old line regiments there should have been seventy to each corps, i.e. 2,450 to the 105 battalions of that arm. But Godoy had allowed the numbers to sink to 1,520. When the insurrection broke out, the vacant places had to be filled, and many regiments received at the same moment twenty or thirty subalterns taken from civil life and completely destitute of military training. Similarly the militia ought to have had 1,800 officers, and only possessed 1,200 when the war began. The vacancies were filled, but with raw and often indifferent material.

Such were the officers with whom the British army had to co-operate. There is no disguising the fact that from the first the allies could not get on together. In the earlier years of the war there were some incidents that happened while the troops of the two nations lay together, which our countrymen could never forgive or forget. We need only mention the midnight panic in Cuesta's army on the eve of Talavera, when 10,000 men ran away without having had a shot fired at them, and the cowardly behaviour of Lapeña in 1811, when he refused to aid Graham at the bloody little battle of Barossa.

The strictures of Wellington, Napier, and the rest were undoubtedly well deserved; and yet it is easy to be too hard on the Spaniards. It chanced that our countrymen did not get a fair opportunity of observing their allies under favourable conditions; of the old regular army that fought at Baylen or Zornoza they never got a glimpse. It had been practically destroyed before we came upon the field. La Romana's starving hordes, and Cuesta's evasive and demoralized battalions were the samples from which the whole Spanish army was judged. In the Talavera campaign, the first in which English and Spanish troops stood side by side, there can be no doubt that the latter (with few exceptions) behaved in their very worst style. They often did much better; but few Englishmen had the chance of watching a defence like that of Saragossa or Gerona. Very few observers from our side saw anything of the heroically obstinate resistance of the Catalonian miqueletes and somatenes. Chance threw in our way Cuesta and Lapeña and Imaz as types of Peninsular generals, and from them the rest were judged. No one supposes that the Spaniards as a nation are destitute of all military qualities. They made good soldiers enough in the past, and may do so in the future: but when, after centuries of intellectual and political torpor, they were called upon to fight for their national existence, they were just emerging from subjection to one of the most worthless adventurers and one of the most idiotic kings whom history has known. Charles IV and Godoy account for an extraordinary amount of the decrepitude of the monarchy and the demoralization of its army.

It is more just to admire the constancy with which a nation so handicapped persisted in the hopeless struggle, than to condemn it for the incapacity of its generals, the ignorance of its officers, the unsteadiness of its raw levies. If Spain had been a first-rate military power, there would have been comparatively little merit in the six years' struggle which she waged against Bonaparte. When we consider her weakness and her disorganization, we find ourselves more inclined to wonder at her persistence than to sneer at her mishaps. (Oman, 1902.)

== See also ==
- 3rd Swiss Regiment Reding
- Anglo-Portuguese Army
- British Army during the Napoleonic Wars
- Guerrilla warfare in the Peninsular War
- List of Spanish generals of the Peninsular War
- Spain under Joseph Bonaparte
- Timeline of the Peninsular War
- Types of military forces in the Napoleonic Wars

== Bibliography ==
- Chisholm, Hugh, ed. (1911). "Miquelets" . Encyclopædia Britannica. Vol. 18 (11th ed.). Cambridge University Press. p. 566.
- Glover, Michael (1974). The Peninsular War 1807–1814: A Concise Military History. Penguin Classic Military History (published 2001). ISBN 0141390417.
- Guia de Forasteros en Madrid para el año 1821. Imp. Nacional, 1821. Google Books (provides dates and formation of regiments, etc.)
- Oman, Charles (1902). "A History of the Peninsula War". Project Gutenberg.
- Oman, Charles (1903). "A History of the Peninsula War". Project Gutenberg.
