= Juan Pignatelli =

Italian-born Spanish army officer (1757–1819)

- Born: 27 January 1757; Turin
- Died: 9 November 1819 (aged 62) Madrid
- Conflicts: American Revolutionary War; War of the Pyrenees; Peninsular War

Juan Domingo Pignatelli de Aragón y de Gonzaga, 6th Duke of Solferino, 19th Count of Fuentes (27 January 1757 – 9 November 1819) was a Spanish Army officer and nobleman.

== Early career ==
After studying at the Real Seminario de Nobles de Madrid, Pignatelli enlisted in 1773 as a cadet in the Spanish Royal Guard (Guardias de Corps). In 1779 he was attached as colonel to the Montesa Cavalry Regiment, seeing action at Gibraltar during the American Revolutionary War.

In 1793, during the War of the Pyrenees, he was promoted to field marshal and in 1795 appointed commander-in-chief of the coast of Santander (Comandante General de Toda la Costa de Santander).

Pignatelli was appointed military governor of Zamora in 1801.

He was promoted, in October 1802, to lieutenant general in the same promotion as other notable Spanish military commanders of the Spanish armies during the Peninsular War, including the Duke of the Infantado, Manuel Lapeña, Juan Carrafa, Francisco Castaños, Francisco Taranco, Francisco Eguía, and Arturo O'Neill, among others.

== Peninsular War ==
=== 1808 ===
In May, Lieutenant general Pignatelli was still governor of Zamora and on 30 September, he was appointed commander-in-chief of the Spanish forces in Old Castile.

By mid-October, Pignatelli, based at Logroño, commanded the army of Castile, having substituted Eguia, who was ill. This was, by far, the largest division of Spain's Army of the centre, with 10,000 infantry, 1,500 cavalry, and 14 guns. (Note: The other divisions were as follows: Grimarest: the second division of Andalusia, with 5,000; La Peña's 4th Division, with 5,000 infantry; the artillery, plus a division of infantry, at Cintruénigo; and the remainder at Tudela and neighbouring villages. (Napier, 1844: p. 91.))

Later that month, Castaños dismissed Pignatelli for having retreated from Logroño before Ney's troops and abandoning all his guns at the foot of the mountains around Nalda. His troops were redistributed among the divisions of Grimarest, La Peña, and Llamas, and a brigade of six battalions under Cartaojal, which was then sent back and managed to recover the abandoned guns.

In December, the Junta Suprema ordered Marquis de La Romana to dismiss Pignatelli from the post of captain general of Old Castile and to court-martial him for the "scandalous and cowardly abandonment of Valladolid and Avila". As it was not clear if La Romana received the order or if he decided not to act on it, the Junta would repeat the order the following February.

=== 1809 ===
By the end of January Pignatelli, still captain general of Old Castile, had raised a new regiment, the Volunteers of Avila, which he sent to supplement the under-manned garrison at Ciudad Rodrigo.

=== 1810 ===
In November, the Regency absolved Pignatelli, by then no longer governor of Zamora, of having abandoned Valladolid and Avila to their fate before the enemy.

== See also ==
- Spanish Army (Peninsular War)
