= Carrafa =

Carrafa is a surname. Notable people with the surname include:

- Juan Carrafa (1755–1825?), Italian military officer in the Spanish army
- Nick Carrafa (fl. 1984–), Australian actor
- John Carrafa (fl. 1987–), American theater and film director and choreographer
