= Battle of Uclés (1809) =

1809 Battle of the Peninsular War

- Part of the Peninsular War
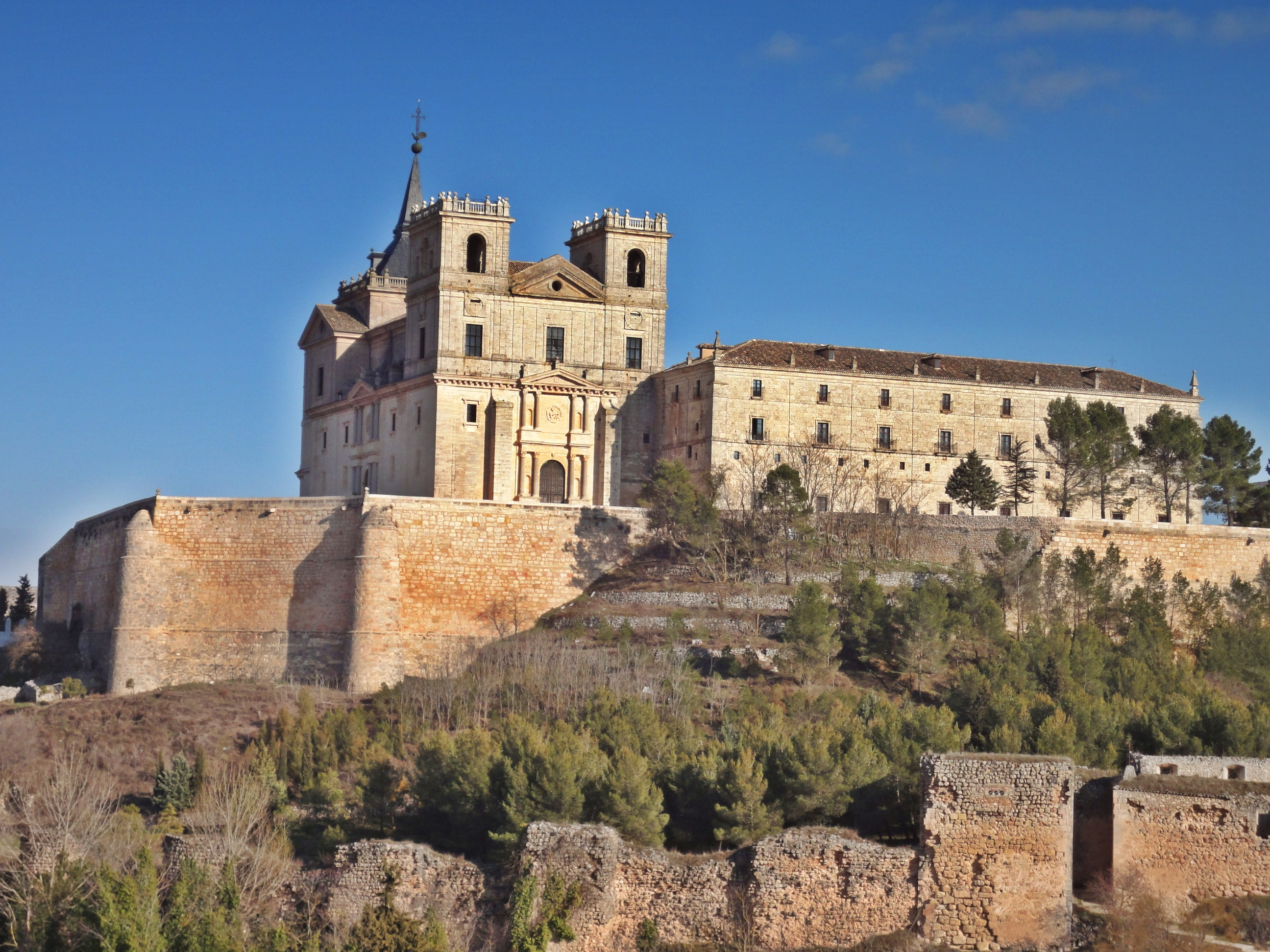
- Venegas watched the battle from the monastery in Uclés
Date	13 January 1809
Location	Uclés, Spain 39°59′N 2°51′W
Result	French victory

Belligerents
France	Spain

Commanders and leaders
(France) Claude Victor	(Spain) Francisco Venegas

Units involved
(France) I Corps	(Spain) Army of the Center

Strength
15,500–16,300	11,300–11,980

Casualties and losses
200	7,000

Peninsular War: Castile & Andalusia
current battle

The Battle of Uclés (13 January 1809) saw an Imperial French corps led by Marshal Claude Perrin Victor attack a Spanish force under Francisco Javier Venegas. The French easily crushed their outnumbered foes, capturing over half of the Spanish infantry. Uclés is located in the province of Cuenca 15 kilometres (9.3 mi) east of Tarancón and 100 kilometres (62 mi) southeast of Madrid. The action occurred during what is called the Peninsular War in English-speaking countries and the Spanish War of Independence in Spain. The war was part of a larger struggle known as the Napoleonic Wars.

Emperor Napoleon invaded Spain with a huge army in late 1808, scattered the Spanish forces, and seized Madrid. However, the appearance of a British army commanded by John Moore caused the French emperor to order his army to pursue the British into northwest Spain. With their enemies spread thin, the Spanish armies began to revive. In late December 1808, the Army of the Center led by Pedro de Alcántara Álvarez de Toledo, 13th Duke of the Infantado advanced slowly toward Madrid, causing alarm among the scanty French forces guarding the capital. The cautious Infantado sent his lieutenant Venegas with a strong vanguard to annoy the French. After Venegas won a minor action at Tarancón, Victor concentrated his corps and marched against him in mid-January 1809. Without instructions or support from Infantado, Venegas unwisely tried to hold a strong position at Uclés. Victor overwhelmed the Spanish defenders with one division and herded many of them into the arms of his second division which had marched around their flank. Gathering up Venegas' survivors, Infantado led his crippled army into the mountains but not before losing much of his artillery. Blamed for the fiasco, Infantado was relieved of command. The next action in the area was the Battle of Ciudad Real in March.

== Background ==
After the Dos de Mayo Uprising and the subsequent disaster at the Battle of Bailén, the French occupying armies in Spain were forced to pull back behind the Ebro River in the northeast. Shocked and enraged at the turn of events, Napoleon ordered 130,000 veteran soldiers to march into Spain. The French emperor planned to unite the reinforcements with the troops already there and lead them to conquer Spain and Portugal once and for all. Meanwhile, the Spanish people had been deceived by their relatively easy successes and believed that the struggle was almost over. The Spanish generals and politicians began to squabble among themselves. By 10 October 1808, Napoleon had 244,125 soldiers massed in eight army corps, the cavalry reserve, the Imperial Guard, and other formations for the purpose of conquering Spain. In November 1808, the Napoleonic armies struck with crushing force and the Spanish defenses unraveled in battles at Burgos, Espinosa, Tudela, and Somosierra. On 1 December, Madrid meekly capitulated to Napoleon. The French emperor reinstalled his brother Joseph Bonaparte as king and began rewriting the laws. He intended to send armies to seize Seville in the south and reconquer Portugal at the first opportunity. However, a new enemy appeared on the scene to upset Napoleon's plans.

On 11 December 1808, General John Moore led a British army numbering 22,500 foot soldiers, 2,500 horsemen, and 66 artillery pieces northeast from Salamanca. Moore had written to a fellow general, "if the bubble bursts and Madrid falls, we shall have to run for it." Soon after, Moore learned that Napoleon had seized Madrid and that over 200,000 Imperial French troops were in the field. Nevertheless, the British general decided to strike at Marshal Nicolas Soult's isolated II Corps in the north of Spain. When the British cavalry routed Soult's horsemen at the Battle of Sahagún on 21 December, the French marshal was completely surprised. Meanwhile, Napoleon found out what was going on and ordered 80,000 troops to march north to annihilate the British.

Getting news of the avalanche coming his way, Moore led his army toward Corunna in northwest Spain. Though ultimately the British army was safely evacuated, Moore was slain at the Battle of Corunna on 16 January 1809 and 5,000 of his soldiers died during the mid-winter retreat. Because of his unsuccessful effort to destroy Moore's army, Napoleon's plans for conquering Spain and Portugal were temporarily sidetracked. Napoleon personally quit Spain on 19 January 1809 and never returned. By 23 January he was in Paris, preparing for the next war with the Austrian Empire. Napoleon had predicted his conquest of Spain would cost 12,000 men, but the actual death toll from battle and disease through mid-January 1809 may have been as high as 75,000. The emperor hoped that his brother Joseph and his marshals would soon complete the conquest of the Iberian Peninsula. This hope proved to be a vain one.

== Operations ==
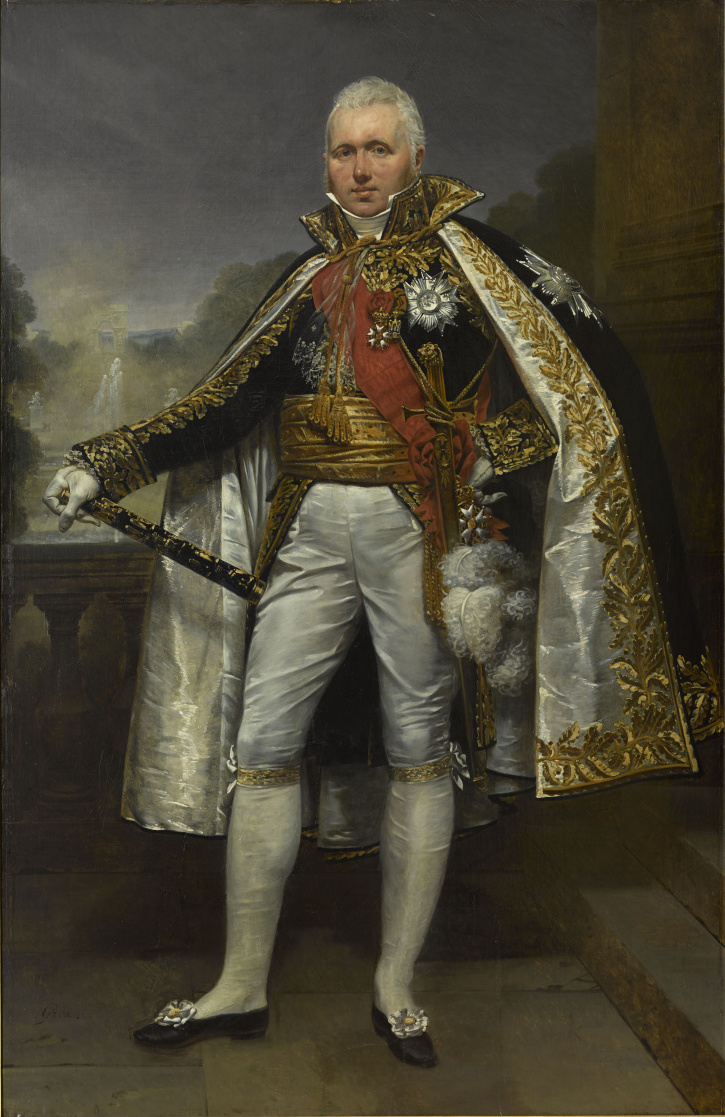
Claude Perrin Victor

The month of December saw General of Division Laurent Gouvion Saint-Cyr drub the Spanish forces of Captain General Juan Miguel de Vives y Feliu at the Battle of Molins de Rey while Marshal Jean Lannes began the Second Siege of Zaragoza. With Napoleon and his main field army away chasing Moore, the Imperial troops holding Madrid were too weak to mount any offensives. In total, there were 28,000 infantry, 8,000 cavalry, and 90 guns in Marshal Claude Perrin Victor's I Corps, Marshal François Joseph Lefebvre's IV Corps, and the cavalry divisions of Generals of Division Antoine Lasalle, Marie Victor de Latour-Maubourg, and Édouard Jean Baptiste Milhaud. Not counted was King Joseph's Royal Guard consisting of four battalions and one cavalry regiment of Frenchmen plus two small regiments of Spanish deserters.

The cavalry formed the outer line of defense. Latour-Maubourg posted a cavalry brigade each in Tarancón, Ocaña, and Madridejos. To the west, Milhaud's troopers patrolled the area around Talavera de la Reina. Farthest west were Lasalle's horsemen watching Almaraz where there was an important bridge across the Tagus River. Victor defended Aranjuez with General of Division Eugène-Casimir Villatte's division while Lefebvre held Talavera with the divisions of Generals of Division Horace François Sébastiani and Jean-Baptiste Cyrus de Valence. The 55th Line Infantry Regiment of General of Division Jean-Joseph, Marquis Dessolles's absent reserve division was posted at Guadalajara. Aside from the Royal Guards, Madrid was garrisoned by General of Division François Amable Ruffin with an I Corps division and General of Division Jean François Leval with a IV Corps division.

The Army of the Center ended its retreat at Cuenca on 10 December 1808. Its new commander General Pedro de Alcántara Álvarez de Toledo, 13th Duke of the Infantado allowed his soldiers to rest but was forced to execute three soldiers. One, a lieutenant had refused to march and positioned his artillery battery to fire on the troops who were obeying orders. The remnant of the 1st Division was sent home to Valencia province to recruit, while the 2nd, 3rd, and 4th Divisions were reorganized into four divisions including a Vanguard and a Reserve. Many low-strength line regiments were consolidated from three battalions into one or two. Stragglers and reinforcements swelled the ranks. The soldiers' spirits rose when a brigade under General Conde de Alacha Lilli marched into camp, having escaped from Napoleon's armies. Hearing that the emperor had gone off to the north, Infantado decided to launch an offensive toward Madrid before his reorganization was completed.

== Spanish offensive ==
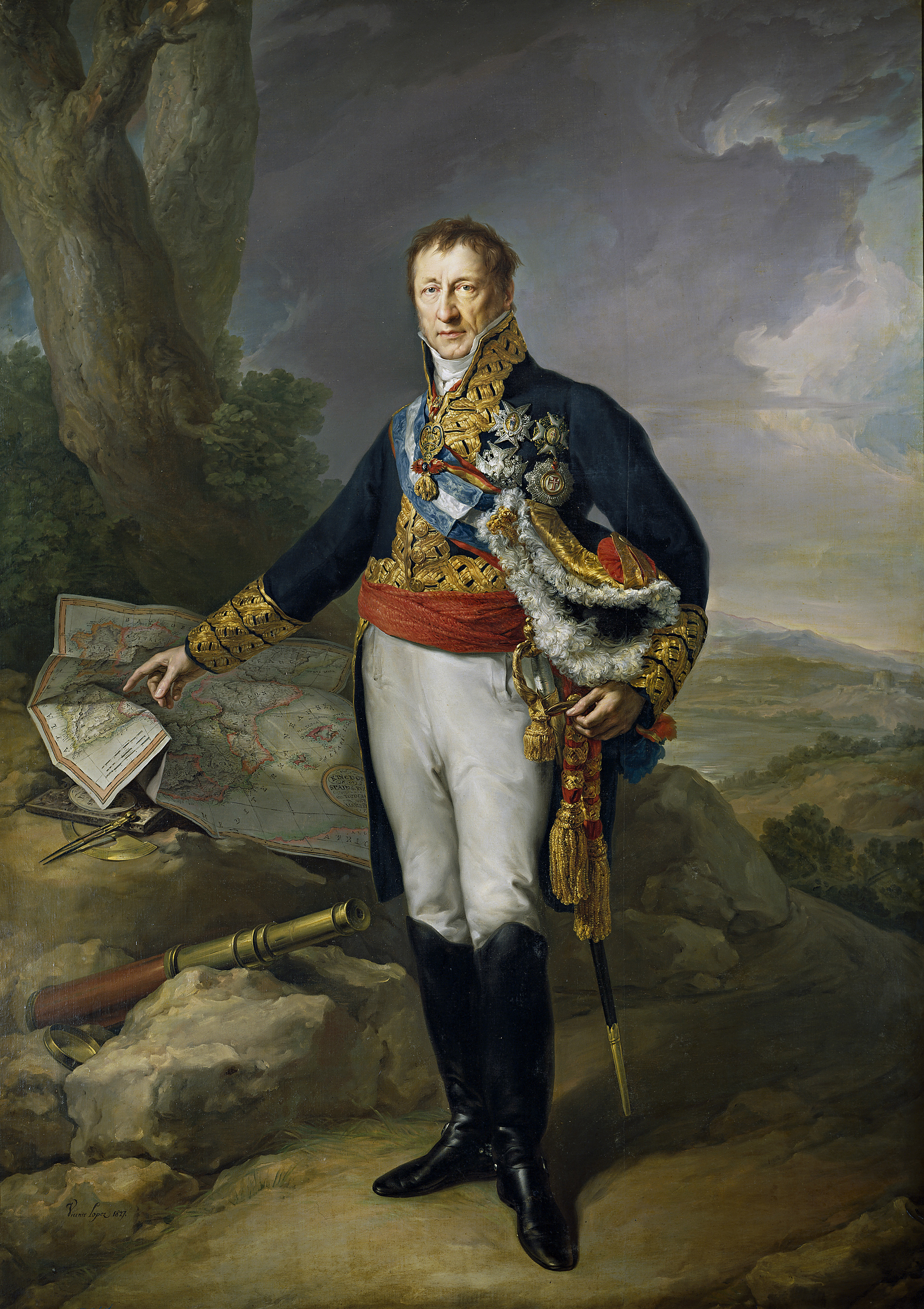
Duke of Infantado

On 25 December 1808, Infantado sent General Francisco Javier Venegas with the Vanguard and most of the cavalry to seize Tarancón while Brigadier General Antonio Senra and 4,000 soldiers moved on Aranjuez. Senra found Villatte's division at Aranjuez and declined to attack, an action for which he was harshly criticized by Infantado. Meanwhile, Venegas managed to encircle General of Brigade André Thomas Perreimond and his dragoon brigade in Tarancón. At the last moment, the French detected what was afoot and hurriedly saddled up their horses. Perreimond decided to break out at once. When the dragoons charged the Spanish force that had gotten behind the town, the infantry were forced to form squares. Perreimond's troopers then rode between the squares to safety, but not before 50 to 60 saddles were emptied. Because the Spanish cavalry was late into action, the two dragoon regiments got away without further damage.

Farther to the west, on December 24 Lefebvre marched to seize the bridge at Almaraz as instructed. His soldiers captured the bridge and four cannons in a coup, dispersing the Spanish defenders. At this time, the marshal made a remarkable error. Leaving only Lasalle's cavalry and two battalions on the Tagus, he marched northeast to Ávila, ignoring repeated instructions from King Joseph to desist. Arriving at Ávila on 5 January, Lefebvre's corps was completely removed from the defensive lines around Madrid. Infuriated with his disobedient subordinate, Napoleon removed Lefebvre from command and gave the IV Corps to Sébastiani.

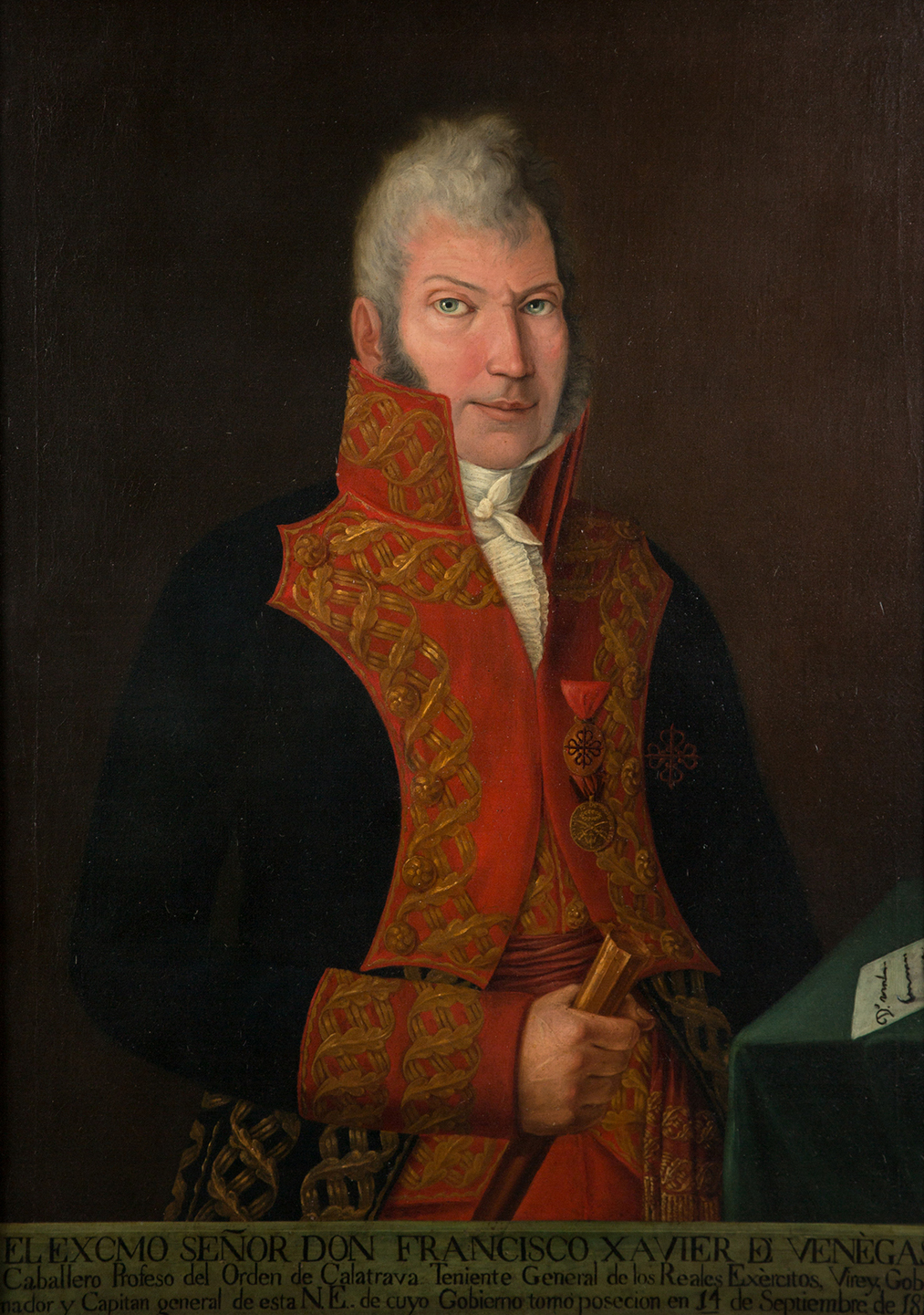
Francisco Venegas

With the IV Corps out of position, revolts breaking out, and the Army of the Center threatening Madrid, Joseph and his adviser Marshal Jean-Baptiste Jourdan were in a panic. Only Villatte and Latour-Maubourg with 9,000 soldiers stood between Infantado and the capital. But, instead of pressing his advantage, the Spanish commander became inert between 26 December and 11 January. Infantado seems to have spent his time concocting fantastic strategical schemes while leaving his lieutenant Venegas without instructions. To support the Army of the Center, a 6,000-man Spanish division under General Marquis del Palacio moved north from the Sierra Morena to Villaharta.

While Infantado dithered, Joseph and Jourdan moved swiftly against the local insurrections. The 27th Light Infantry put down the rebellion in Chinchón with extreme brutality; all the men in the town were massacred. Colmenar Viejo suffered also, with numerous inhabitants being executed. Joseph ordered Victor to shift east from Aranjuez to Arganda del Rey to block the road from Tarancón. On 8 January, the division of Dessolles arrived in Madrid followed in two days by the return of the IV Corps from Ávila. These heavy reinforcements allowed Napoleon's defensive scheme around Madrid to be reestablished. Reinforced by the Dutch Brigade, Leval's division was sent to garrison Talavera while Valence's division was ordered to hold Toledo. The divisions of Dessolles and Sébastiani became the Madrid garrison. Victor was sent Ruffin's division as a reinforcement and ordered to attack.

== Battle ==
=== Prelude ===
Victor marched forth on 12 January with 12,000 infantry and 3,500 cavalry in the divisions of Ruffin, Villatte, Latour-Maubourg, and the I Corps light cavalry. Learning of the enemy's approach, Venegas withdrew from Tarancón to Uclés where he was joined by Antonio Senra's brigade. He requested further instructions from the commander of the Army of the Center, but none were forthcoming. Instead, Infantado sent three or four battalions of reinforcements and advised his lieutenant that he was on the way. However, he did not give any date for his appearance. Venegas had reservations about offering battle to Victor. But, perhaps swayed by the favorable defensive position at Uclés, he decided to stand his ground with approximately 9,500 foot soldiers, 1,800 horsemen, and five cannons, one of which was broken down. Though some of the regiments were veterans of Bailén, many of the units had shaky morale.

=== Forces ===
On 11 January 1809, Infantado's 21,216-strong army consisted of the 3,929-man Vanguard under Major General José María de la Cueva, 14th Duke of Alburquerque, the 4,295-strong Reserve led by Lieutenant General Manuel la Peña, the 5,121-man 1st Division commanded by Lieutenant General Antonio Malet, Marqués de Coupigny, the 5,288-strong 2nd Division under Major General Conde de Orgaz, approximately 2,800 cavalry, 383 sappers, and 386 artillerists. Venegas' force was a collection of units drawn piecemeal from all five major units of the Army of the Center. The Vanguard contributed 2,848 men, the Reserve 1,634, the 1st Division 2,804, the 2nd Division 1,917, and the cavalry 1,814. There were also 383 sappers and about 100 artillerists. Gaston Bodart stated that the Spanish took 11,300 men into battle. Historian David Gates wrote that there were 11,980 Spanish troops, including 9,500 infantry, 2,000 cavalry, and 480 gunners with 4 guns.

According to Charles Oman and Digby Smith, the French had 12,000 infantry and 3,500 cavalry. Oman also asserted that the I Corps artillery had 48 field pieces manned by 1,523 gunners. Smith stated that there were four foot artillery batteries, two per infantry division, plus two additional horse artillery batteries at Uclés. The three dragoon brigades were commanded by Generals of Brigade Perreimond, Ignace Laurent d'Oullenbourg, and Alexandre, vicomte Digeon. Gates stated that Victor commanded 16,300 men at Uclés. Of these, Ruffin led 5,000 troops, Villatte 7,000, Latour-Maubourg 2,500, General of Brigade Louis-Chrétien Carrière, Baron de Beaumont 1,300, and the artillery 500 with 32 guns. Bodart wrote that the French engaged 15,500 men in the battle. General of Division Pierre Belon Lapisse's 2nd Division was on detached duty.

=== Action ===
Venegas strung out his soldiers along a northeast to southwest ridge. Three infantry battalions and four cavalry regiments formed an advance guard to watch the approach of the French from Tribaldos village. Four battalions defended the town of Uclés in the center with remaining cavalry and the four guns in front. Eight battalions held the right flank, while six battalions deployed on the left flank. Venegas held only a single battalion in reserve; the rest of his units formed a single overextended line. On 13 January, Victor marched from Tarancón at dawn in two columns. Victor with Villatte's and most of Latour-Maubourg's divisions took the right-hand road, which was more direct. Ruffin's division and some cavalry took the left-hand road. Villatte quickly drove the advance guard out of Tribaldos; it fell back to the main Spanish position. After getting a good look at the Spanish line, Victor ordered Ruffin to sweep wide to the left and take Venegas in right flank and rear.

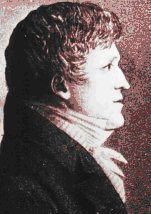
Eugène Villatte

Victor deployed Villatte's division and the cavalry, a total of about 7,000 foot soldiers and 2,500 horsemen. In the center, a battery unlimbered and began bombarding the Spanish cavalry and Uclés. The dragoons were posted behind the artillery. Meanwhile, the 94th and 95th Line under General of Brigade Jacques-Pierre-Louis Puthod made a wide sweep to the right. Ascending the end of the ridge where the slope was less steep, Puthod's six battalions attacked the Spanish left flank and began driving it back. From his vantage point at the monastery in Uclés, Venegas ordered some units from the right flank to go to the assistance of his imperiled left. However, the French attack proceeded swiftly and crumpled up the Spanish left flank before the reinforcements could give any help. Puthod's troops soon reached the walls of Uclés.

When Victor saw the success of his right wing, he ordered Villatte's left wing brigade under General of Brigade Michel-Marie Pacthod to attack the Spanish right flank. Since many of the defending units had been sent to the left, Pacthod's assault easily reached the top of the ridge. Shaken by the obvious reverse on the left flank, the right flank troops offered little resistance. Soon, Venegas's entire force was retreating from the field. The cavalry seems to have fought hardly at all leaving only two or three battalions under General Pedro Agustín Girón to act as the rear guard. Meanwhile, Ruffin's division lost its way and made a wider march than intended. Though Ruffin was late to the field, he and his troops fortuitously arrived squarely in the Spanish rear. Latour-Maubourg's pursuing dragoons drove Venegas' hapless soldiers right into the arms of Ruffin's nine battalions. The nimble Spanish cavalry largely escaped along with some left flank infantry, while Girón's men broke out between two French regiments. But the majority of the Spanish foot soldiers were trapped and forced to surrender.

== Results ==
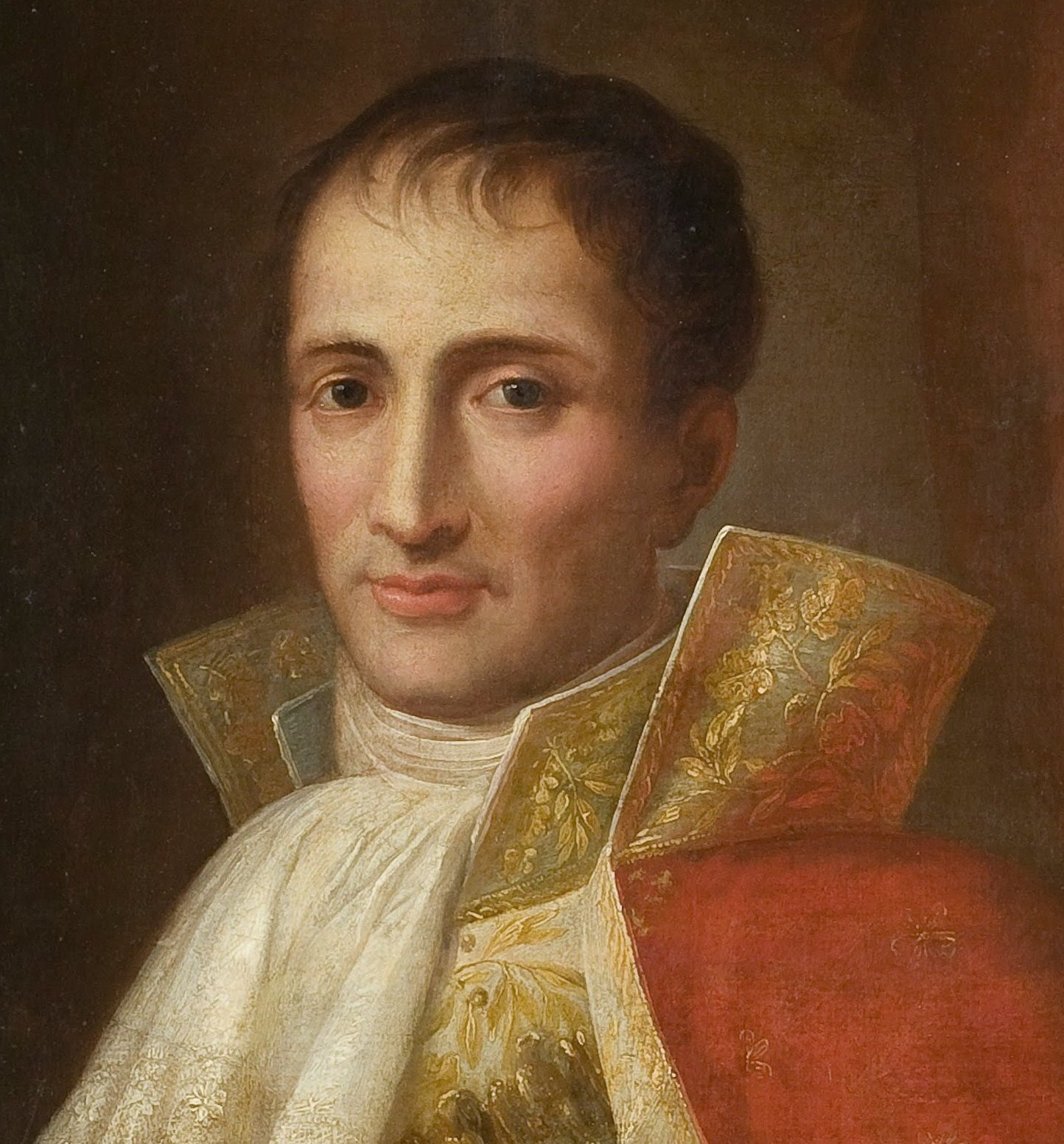
Joseph Bonaparte

The French captured four generals, 17 colonels, 306 lower-ranking officers, and 5,560 men for a total of 5,887 prisoners. The I Corps also seized four artillery pieces and 20 colors. In addition, the Spanish suffered losses of perhaps 1,000 killed and wounded. Victor admitted a loss of 150 though another source gave a total of 200 French casualties. Bodart wrote that the French sustained 200 casualties while inflicting 7,000 casualties on the Spanish. Despite their easy triumph, the French soldiery got out of control after the battle, sacking Uclés and murdering 69 civilians. In particular, monks were singled out for slaughter for allegedly firing on French soldiers. The prisoners were also treated cruelly, according to two French eyewitnesses. When the Spaniards were marched to Madrid, their captors shot down those who were unable to keep up; 30 or more men per day were put to death in this manner.

Meanwhile, Infantado with his remaining 9,000 soldiers set out from Cuenca on 12 January. By that evening he reached La Horcajada, which is 15 miles (24 km) east of Uclés. Continuing their advance on the 13th, Infantado's men came across the remnants of Venegas' force and got word of the disaster. The army commander called for an immediate withdrawal to Cuenca. Gathering up his wagon train and supplies, Infantado abandoned his base and led his troops to Chinchilla de Monte-Aragón where he arrived on 20 January. However, the Spanish guns were delayed by bad weather and swollen streams. Protected by only one cavalry regiment, the artillery convoy was intercepted by Digeon's brigade at Tórtola de Henares on the 18th. In all, 15 artillery pieces were seized by the French dragoons.

After occupying Cuenca, Victor determined that the Army of the Center was out of reach. The marshal then went looking for Palacios' division at Villaharta. When Palacios heard of the Uclés debacle, he withdrew to the Sierra Morena. Finding that his prey escaped, Victor occupied Madridejos. Deeming the Spanish people sufficiently cowed by the victory at Uclés, Napoleon finally allowed his brother Joseph to make a triumphal entry into his capital at Madrid. The spectacle occurred on 22 January after which King Joseph entered his palace. Under threat, Joseph's Spanish subjects swore fealty to their new king. After marching to join Palacios at the Despeñaperros Pass, Infantado was removed from command for failing to support Venegas. General José de Urbina y Urbina, 3rd Conde de Cartaojal assumed command of the Army of the Center. The next action was the Battle of Ciudad Real on 27 March 1809.

== See also ==
- Timeline of the Peninsular War

== Bibliography ==
- Bodart, Gaston (1908). Militär-historisches Kriegs-Lexikon (1618-1905).
- Chandler, David G. (1966a). The Campaigns of Napoleon. New York, N.Y.: Macmillan. ISBN 0-02-523660-1.
- Gates, David (2002). The Spanish Ulcer: A History of the Peninsular War. London: Pimlico. ISBN 0-7126-9730-6.
- Oman, Charles (2010) [1902]. A History of the Peninsular War Volume I. Vol. 1. La Vergne, Tenn.: Kessinger Publishing. ISBN 1432636820.
- Oman, Charles (1995) [1903]. A History of the Peninsular War Volume II. Vol. 2. Mechanicsburg, Pa.: Stackpole. ISBN 1-85367-215-7.
- Smith, Digby (1998). The Napoleonic Wars Data Book. London: Greenhill. ISBN 1-85367-276-9.

Preceded by Battle of Castellón	Napoleonic Wars; Battle of Uclés (1809)	Succeeded by Battle of Corunna
