= Pedro González Llamas =

Spanish army officer (c. 1738 – 1822)

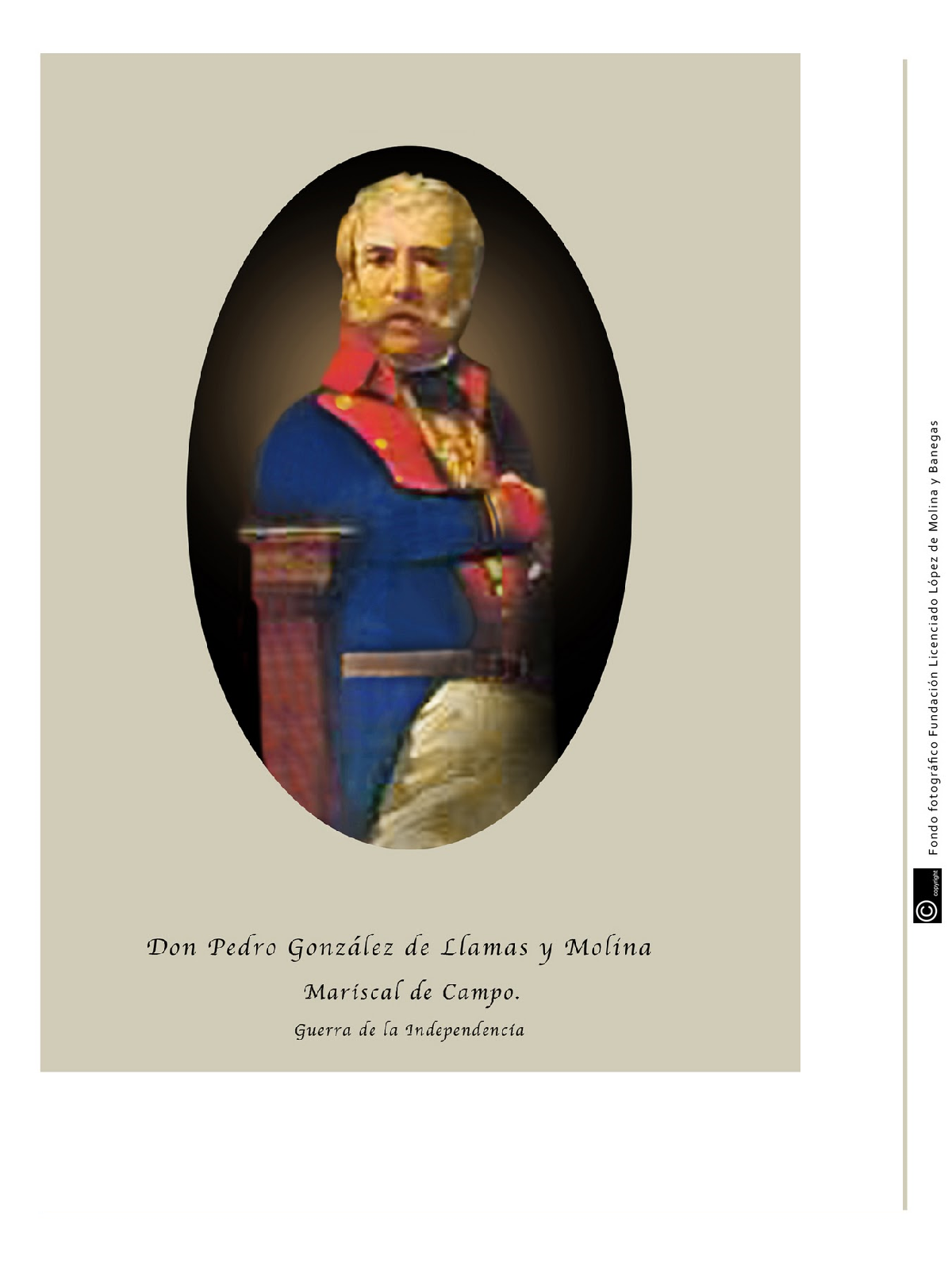
- Born: c. 1738; Ricote, Murcia
- Died: 18 June 1822 (aged 55) Archena, Murcia
- Conflicts: Fantastic War; Spanish invasion of Portugal (1762); American Revolutionary War; Great Siege of Gibraltar; War of the Pyrenees; Peninsular War

Pedro González Llamas (c. 1738 – 1822) was a Spanish general in the Peninsular War and one of the deputies, for Murcia, who signed the Spanish Constitution of 1812.

== Early career ==
Shortly after enlisting as a cadet in the Royal Guard in 1762, González Llamas saw active service during the Spanish invasion of Portugal that year.

At the Great Siege of Gibraltar, the commander-in-chief of the Spanish forces, Martín Álvarez de Sotomayor, promoted him to major. He was wounded at the beginning of 1781, and at the end of that year, was promoted to lieutenant colonel. Louis de Crillón, the allied commander-in-chief appointed him to lead one of the columns of Grenadiers. At the beginning of 1783 he was promoted to colonel of the Royal Guards Regiment in the general promotion of that year but requested to be transferred to the Provincial Regiment of Murcia, of which he was appointed the lieutenant colonel.

During the War of the Pyrenees, as colonel of the Provincial Grenadiers of New Castile, González Llamas served in the Roussillon under General Ricardos, distinguishing himself at the attack, led by Field Marshal Rafael Adorno, on the French camp at Cornella (August 1793). At the First Battle of Boulou, he was taken prisoner during a sortie from the Spanish fortified camp. In November that year he was promoted to colonel of the Provincial Regiment of Murcia, and to Infantry brigadier that December.

== Peninsular War ==
Promoted to lieutenant general in 1808, later that year the Junta of Valencia and Murcia accused him of not having faced the enemy and relieved him of his command in that region. The commission appointed to investigate him, which included the Count of Montijo, fully exonerated him, as did the report submitted by JoséCaro in July 1808.

Following the September 1808 meeting at which the new Army of Spain was defined, and which incorporated the divisions he had brought from Valencia and Murcia, totalling some 4,500 men, including infantry and cavalry, into the Army of the centre, Llamas headed for Tudela with his troops. Establishing his headquarters there, he was joined shortly afterwards by La Peña's 10,000 men and, on 17 October, by Castaños.

Shortly afterwards, however, on taking up a post in the Gobierno Supremo, he would hand over the command of his troops to Pedro Roca and become directly involved in the setting up the Cortes of Cádiz.

== Constitution ==
Having initially refused to sign the Constitution, on being ordered by the Cortes of Cádiz to do so, Llamas finally signed, as deputy for the Reino de Murcia.
