= Francisco de Eguía =

Spanish soldier

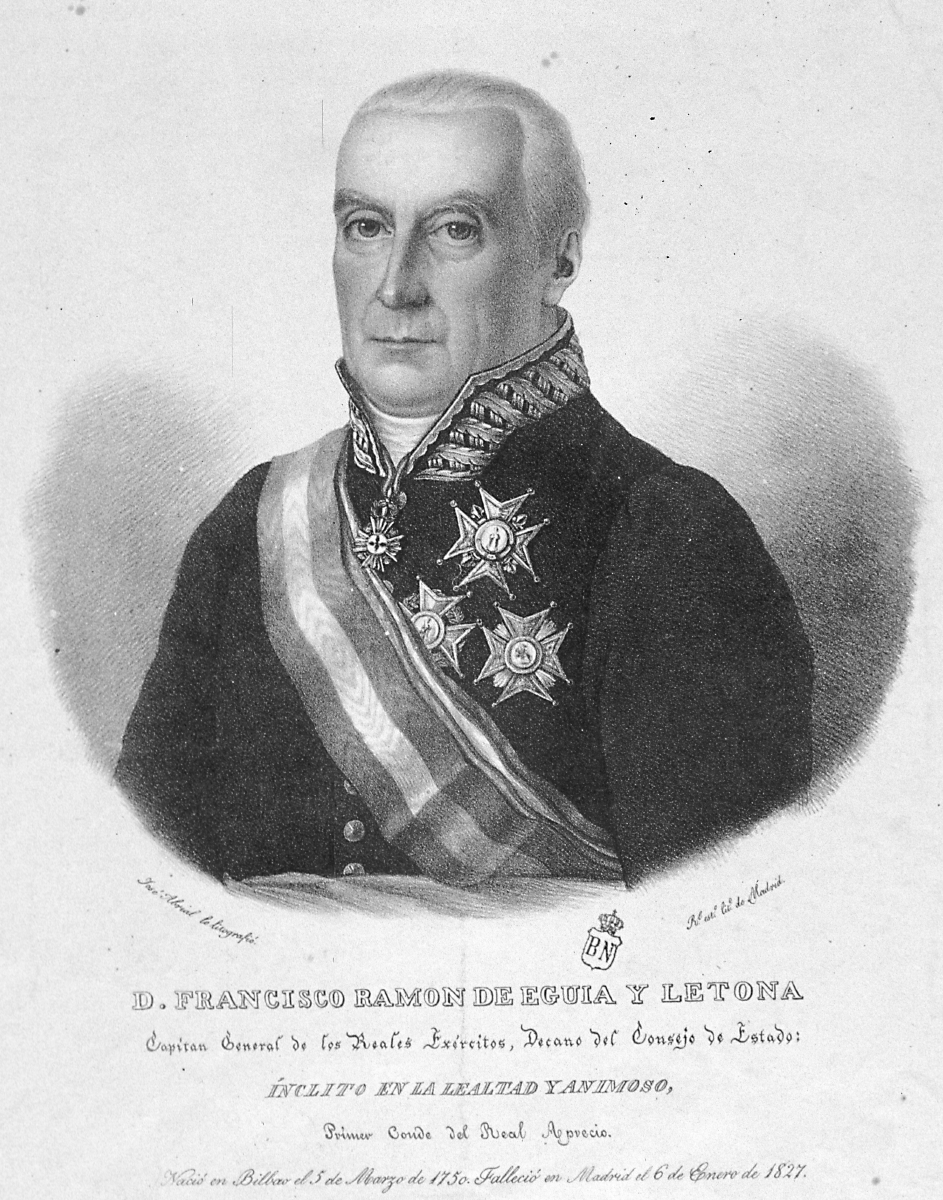
- Born: 5 March 1750; Durango, Vizcaya
- Died: 6 January 1827 (aged 76) Madrid

Francisco Ramón de Eguía y López de Letona, 1st Conde del Real Aprecio was a Spanish military commander and politician.

== Early career ==
After seeing action against the French in the War of the Pyrenees, Eguía was promoted to field marshal in 1795. Two years later, he was appointed governor of Jaca. In 1802 he was promoted to lieutenant general, in the same promotion as other notable Spanish military commanders of the Spanish armies during the Peninsular War, including the Duke of the Infantado, Manuel Lapeña, Juan Carrafa, Francisco Castaños, Francisco Taranco, Juan Pignatelli, and Arturo O'Neill.

== Peninsular War ==
Eguía fought under General Cuesta at Medellin (March 1809), where he was in charge of the right wing of Cuesta's army. Following Cuesta's resignation in mid-August 1809, (Note: Cuesta's health had deteriorated due to the injuries he had received at Medellin, and he resigned after becoming disabled by a paralytic stroke. (Oman, 1903: p. 605.)) Eguía, as Cuesta's second-in-command, was, for some weeks, interim commander-in-chief of the Army of Extremadura until the Junta appointed Juan Carlos Areizaga. (Note: "The Junta found ere long a general [Areizaga] just as rash and incapable, if not quite so old [as Cuesta], to whom to entrust the command of its largest army". (Oman, 1903: p. 605.)) Eguía incurred Wellesley's wrath (Note: "... As however your Excellency entertains that doubt, any further correspondence between us appears unnecessary, and accordingly this is the last letter which I shall have the honour of addressing to you". Wellesley to Eguia, Aug. 19. (Oman, 1903: Footnotes 743 & 744.)) while trying to persuade him to postpone the withdrawal of British troops from Spain.

In September 1809, Eguía marched three divisions of infantry and twelve or thirteen regiments of cavalry, some 25,000 men in all, of the Army of Extremadura (Note: The remainder of the Army of Extremadura, two divisions of infantry, numbering some 12,000 troops, plus 2,500 cavalry, was left in Estremadura under the Duke of Albuquerque, who then had to send a cavalry brigade to join the Army of the North, leaving him with only five cavalry regiments, some 1,500 sabres. Of his infantry, over 4,000 were needed to garrison Badajoz, leaving him only 8,000 men available in the field. (Oman, 1908: p. 69.)) to join Venegas's Army of La Mancha, a united force now exceeding 50,000 sabres and bayonets, with which the Junta intended to take Madrid. Venegas was then removed from the command of the united army, with Eguia again holding interim command for a few days until Areizaga arrived from Lerida to take up his command.

== Post-war career ==
Eguía was appointed minister of war in 1814, resigning the following year due to his health, his post being taken up by Francisco Ballesteros. Later that year he was appointed captain general of Old Castile and in 1817 he was again appointed minister of war, a post he held until 1819 when, once again, he resigned due to ill health. On leaving the ministry, he was appointed captain general of the Kingdom of Granada.

== Cultural references ==
=== Copla ===
The Official Chronicler of the City of Madrid from 1966 to 1983, Federico Carlos Sáinz de Robles, mentions in his essay Autobiography of Madrid, a copla popular in Madrid in 1814 and 1815 about Eguía and two other generals, Francisco Javier de Elío (executed for treason during the Liberal Triennium) and Eroles, the three of whom were considered "uncouth, fanatical and cruel":

Eguía, Eroles, Elío...
Dios te libre de los tres;
porque si Dios no te libra,
¡Santíguate y muérete!
¡Santíguate y muérete!
(Eguía, Eroles, Elío...
God save you from the three
because if God doesn't save you
Make the sign of the cross and prepare to die!
Make the sign of the cross and prepare to die!)
