= Antoine de Malet, Marquis de Coupigny =

French-born Spanish military officer

Antoine de Malet, Marquis of Coupigny
- Born: 1761; Arras, France
- Died: 26 June 1825 (aged 63–64) Madrid, Spain
- Rank: Lieutenant general
- Conflicts: American Revolutionary War; Great Siege of Gibraltar; War of the Pyrenees; War of the Oranges; Siege of Olivenza; Siege of Jurumenha; Peninsular War; Battle of Bailén; Battle of Tudela; Battle of Belchite; Battle of Albuera

Antoine de Malet (in Spanish, Antonio Malet), Marquis of Coupigny (1761–1825) was a French-born Spanish military officer.

== Early career ==
Having obtained Spanish nationality, Coupigny joined the Spanish Royal Guard as a cadet in 1776 and was promoted to alférez that same year. In 1780 he was promoted to alférez of Grenadiers.

He saw action at the Great Siege of Gibraltar in 1781 and in the War of the Pyrenees, where he was wounded. In 1781 he was promoted to second lieutenant, to lieutenant in 1786 and in 1796 to captain of the Royal Guards.

In 1801, Coupigny participated in the War of the Oranges, seeing service at the sieges of Olivenza and Jurumenha.

At the outbreak of the War of the Third Coalition, in 1805, he was appointed commanding officer of Campo de Gibraltar.

== Peninsular War ==
In 1807, Coupigny led the vanguard of the Spanish division that invaded Portugal.

In 1808 the Junta Suprema promoted Coupigny to field marshal and lieutenant general. Given the command of the 2nd Division of the Army of Andalusia, under General Castaños, Coupigny's troops, some 7,300 foot soldiers and 500 horse, made up the vanguard of the Spanish forces at the decisive Battle of Bailén.

He fought at Tudela (November 1808) and Belchite (June 1809), being promoted to commander of the Royal Guard that same year.

In January 1809, Coupigny commanded the 5,121 troops of the 1st Division of the Army of the Centre; battalions from his division participated at the defeat at Uclés (January 1809).

Following the death of General Reding in April 1809, Coupigny took interim command of the Army of Catalonia, with only 6,000 men left from Reding's army.

In 1811 he commanded the 4th Army at La Albuera and, when Lapeña was relieved of command following the battle, Coupigny was given command of the Army of Andalusia.

In 1812, Coupigny was appointed captain general of the Balearic Islands.

== Post-war career ==
Following the 1817 pronunciamento by generals Milans del Bosch and Luis de Lacy, Coupigny ordered Lacy's execution, which led to him having to abandon Mallorca and his post, in 1820, when the revolt led by Rafael del Riego forced King Ferdinand VII to restore the 1812 Constitution, bringing about the Trienio Liberal.
