= Tórtola de Henares =

- Municipality
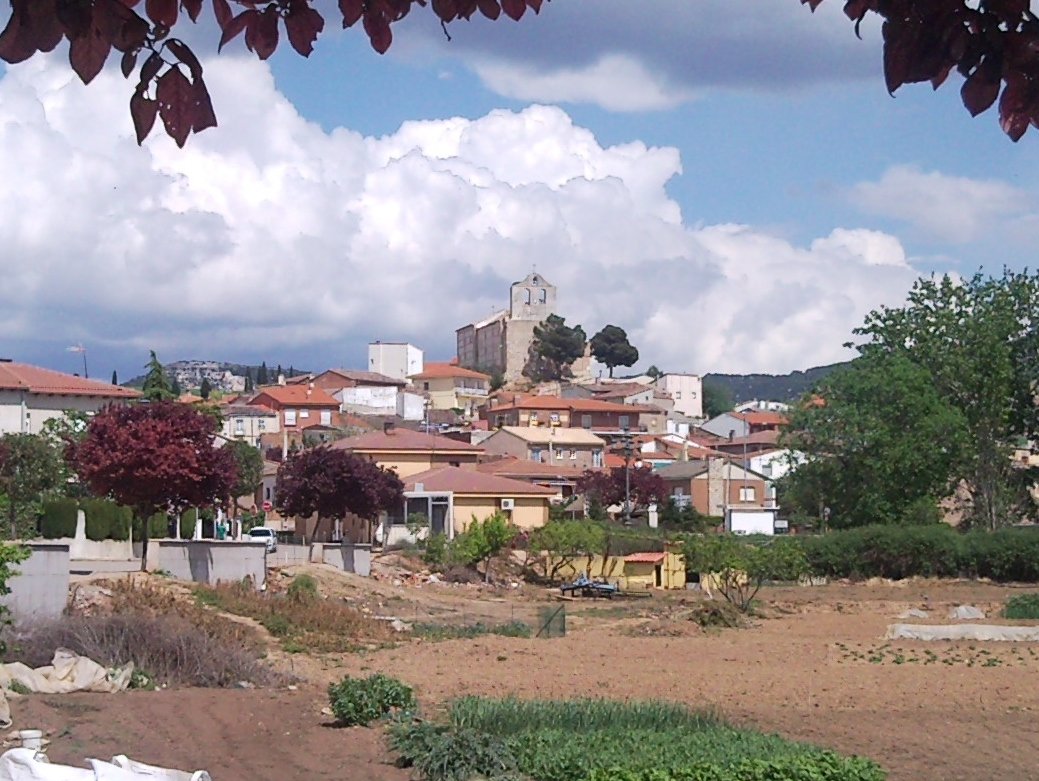

- Flag Coat of arms

- Location within Castilla-La Mancha Location within Spain
- Coordinates: 40°43′23″N 3°07′27″W
- Country: Spain
- Region: Castile-La Mancha
- Province: Guadalajara

Area
  - Total: 26.85 km^{2} (10.37 sq mi)
- Elevation: 736 m (2,415 ft)

Population (2025-01-01)
  - Total: 1,439
  - Density: 53.59/km^{2} (138.8/sq mi)
- Time zone: UTC+1 (CET)
  - Summer (DST): UTC+2 (CEST)

Tórtola de Henares (Spanish pronunciation: [ˈtoɾtola ðe eˈnaɾes]) is a municipality located in the province of Guadalajara, Castile-La Mancha, Spain. The municipality covers an area of 26.85 km^{2}. It lies at 736 metres above sea level. As of 2018, it has a population of 1,012.
