= Juan Carrafa =

Spanish Army officer

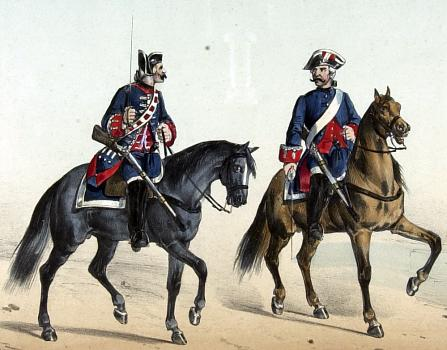
18th century Guardia de Corps (illustration by the Count of Clonard (1824)

Juan Carrafa de la Rocella (1755 – 1825) was a Spanish Army officer.

Born in Naples in 1755 into a noble family with a long tradition of serving the Spanish Crown, in 1779 he enlisted in the Italian Company of the Spanish Royal Guard (Guardias de Corps).

In 1785 he was promoted to colonel of the Milan Infantry of Line Regiment, composed of Italian soldiers in the service of Spain.

Following the October 1790 earthquake in Oran, as commanding officer of the Milan Regiment, he went to Oran with the reinforcements sent over to defend Spain's fortress there, as part of the defensive wall had been destroyed. He stayed there until the siege was lifted in July 1791.

In April 1792, he was promoted to brigadier and the following year to field marshal. In 1802, he was appointed captain general of Extremadura and promoted to lieutenant general in October 1802, to lieutenant general in the same promotion as other notable Spanish military commanders of the Spanish armies during the Peninsular War, including the Duke of the Infantado, Manuel Lapeña, Juan Pignatelli, Francisco Castaños, Francisco Taranco, Francisco Eguía, and Arturo O'Neill.

== Peninsular War ==
Following the signing of the Treaty of Fontainebleau (1807), Carrafa was given the command of the Spanish corps of 7,500 infantrymen, 2,150 cavalry and 20 cannon that was to join Junot's French army at Alcántara, prior to the invasion of Portugal. Despite his seniority over Junot, Carrafa accepted to serve under the orders of the French general.

Carrafa's troops arrived at Porto mid-December and met up with the division that had arrived from Galicia under General Taranco. They then marched towards Lisbon, while Junot, suspicious of the Spanish troops dispersed them among the French troops.

In June 1808, following the Dos de Mayo Uprising and the desertion of Solano's and Belestá's troops towards Spain, Junot ordered that Carrafa's troops be disarmed and confined to barracks.

Following their defeats at Vimiero (August 1808) and Roliça (August 1808), Junot's army abandoned Portugal, allowing for the Spanish troops to be released. However, fearing reprisals from his own troops, Carrafa requested that a British ship take him to a Spanish port. He landed at Cádiz in October 1808, where the authorities kept him detained him at the castle of Santa Catalina. In January 1809 he was court-martialled for his behaviour at the head of his troops in Portugal and was acquitted.

During the siege of Cádiz he was in that city as a member of the Supreme Military Board (Consejo Supremo de Guerra), as an officer without command.

At the end of 1813 he was given leave to travel to Naples, leave which was extended at the end of 1816. Although he was known to be still living in Naples in 1825, there is no information available as to his date of death.
