= Pedro de Alcántara Álvarez de Toledo, 13th Duke of the Infantado =

Spanish Army officer and politician

The Most Excellent Pedro de Alcántara Álvarez de Toledo 13th Duke of the Infantado GE
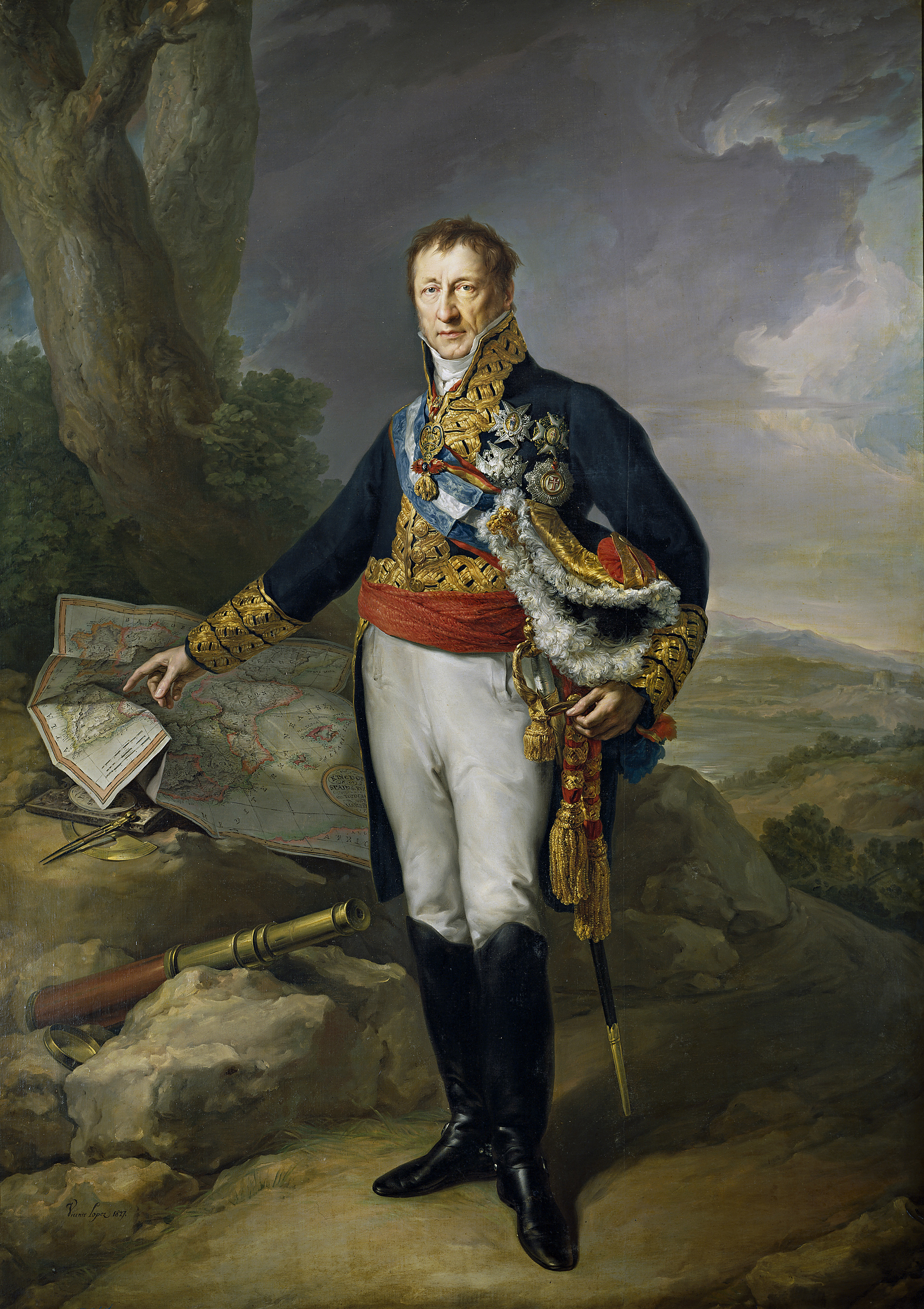
- Portrait by Vicente López Portaña, 1827

Prime Minister of Spain
- In office 24 October 1825 – 19 August 1826
- Monarch: Ferdinand VII
- Preceded by: Francisco Cea Bermúdez
- Succeeded by: Manuel González Salmón

Personal details
- Born: Pedro de Alcántara Álvarez de Toledo y Salm-Salm; 20 July 1768 Madrid, Spain
- Died: 27 November 1841 (aged 73) Madrid, Spain

Pedro de Alcántara Álvarez de Toledo y Salm-Salm, 13th Duke of the Infantado (20 July 1768 – 27 November 1841) was a Spanish Army officer and politician.

== Life and career ==
He held the following titles: 13th Duke of the Infantado, 9th Duke of Pastrana, 9th Duke of Estremera, 10th Duke of Francavilla, plus others. He was an extremely rich, powerful and popular figure in court circles and in Spain generally. He was "more educated than most of the Spanish grandees", having been raised and schooled in Paris.

He never married, but he had one illegitimate son and two illegitimate daughters. His titles were divided amongst his son Manuel and his nephew Pedro de Alcántara Téllez-Girón (1810–1844), who became 14th Duke of the Infantado.

=== Early military career ===
When Spain declared war on Revolutionary France in 1793, he raised an infantry regiment at his own expense. He fought with it in Catalonia against the French beside a Portuguese division and commanded a brigade of the 2nd division of the Army of Estremadura. After the Treaty of Amiens, he used the peace to establish cotton mills in Catalonia using technical experts from England. He was interested in science generally and in 1802 he ordered the first 'double chronometer' from Abraham-Louis Breguet, the world's foremost watchmaker.

He was promoted, in October 1802, to lieutenant general in the same promotion as other notable Spanish military commanders of the Spanish armies during the Peninsular War, including Juan Pignatelli, Manuel Lapeña, Juan Carrafa, Francisco Castaños, Francisco Taranco, Francisco Eguía, and Arturo O'Neill, among others.

In the following years he became very close to Prince Ferdinand, the heir to the Spanish throne. This led him into conflict with the weak King Charles IV and his ambitious chief minister Manuel Godoy. Infantado was banished from Madrid in 1805. Within two years, Ferdinand was arrested and amongst his papers was found a nomination for the duke to be Commander-in-Chief of the Spanish forces. Tried and sentenced to death as a traitor, he was reprieved by popular sentiment and the intervention of the French Ambassador.

=== Peninsular War ===
A revolt in March 1808 resulted in the abdication of the king, the sacking of his manipulative chief minister Godoy and the ascent of Ferdinand VII to the Spanish throne, with the Duke of Infantado at his side. Taking advantage of the chaos, Napoleon "invited" the factions including the Duke, to a conference in Bayonne. At this meeting a new Spanish constitution was signed by the assembled Spanish deputies that resulted in the throne passing to Joseph Bonaparte, Napoleon's brother. The only major Spanish figure that spoke in opposition was the Duke of Infantado, who "had opposed to the utmost any recognition of the foreign monarch". Not long afterwards the Duke called the nation to arms to resist the French, for which he was condemned as a traitor yet again, but this time by Napoleon. At the head of the Spanish army he was defeated by the French in 1809 at the Battle of Uclés. His palace at Guadalajara and all his goods were confiscated by Joseph. The duke joined forces with the British, at that time under Sir John Moore. He was highly regarded by the British plenipotentiary, John Hookham Frere, who was accustomed to late and inaccurate intelligence from his allies: "Had Sir John Moore been so fortunate as to find so candid a correspondent as the Duke of Infantado, a person who would describe things as they were, there is no doubt that the events and conclusion of the campaign would have been very different", referring to Moore's retreat to Corunna. Wellington later had much cordial correspondence with the duke during the later stages of the Peninsular War.

In 1811, the Spanish parliament, the Cortes, nominated him as President of the Council of Spain and sent him on a secret mission to the Prince Regent in London. He returned in 1812, and although he was proposed by Wellington as head of the 4th Army, under British control, his enemies at the Spanish court decreed otherwise, and he had to be content with leading his own regiment. After the end of the war with France in 1814, he retired again.

=== Post-war career ===
He was recalled in 1823 to the Presidency of the Regency (prime minister of Spain) and was responsible for returning the king to the throne. Soon afterwards, tired of intrigue in the court and government, he retired to his country estates, where he died in 1841.

== Heraldry ==
Heraldry of Pedro de Alcántara Álvarez de Toledo, 13th Duke of Infantado

Spanish nobility
Preceded by Pedro de Alcántara Álvarez de Toledo y Silva	Duke of the Infantado; 1790–1841	Succeeded by Pedro de Alcántara Téllez-Girón y Beaufort Spontin
