= Pedro Grimarest =

Spanish military officer

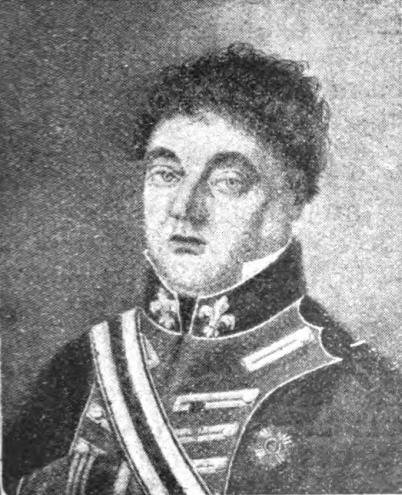
- Born: 31 January 1765; Peñíscola, Castellón
- Died: 12 February 1841 (aged 76) Manila, Filipinas
- Rank: Lieutenant general
- Conflicts: War of the Pyrenees; War of the Oranges; War of the Third Coalition; Peninsular War; Battle of Bailén; Battle of Tudela

Pedro María Legallois Grimarest (1765–1841) was a Spanish military officer.

== Early career ==
He enlisted in the Regiment of Asturias in 1777 and went to New Spain to join his regiment there. Promoted to second lieutenant in 1779, he returned to Spain in 1784.

In August 1785, he accompanied the Spanish ambassador to Morocco and was promoted to lieutenant that same month.

He joined the garrison at Oran in October 1790, where he was promoted to captain of Fusiliers and where he distinguished himself defending the fortress the following year.

During the War of the Pyrenees, he was stationed at Navarra, Guipúzcoa and Aragón, as aide-de-camp of the major general and spent eleven months at Jaca. He saw action at Urdos (June 1794) and was promoted to lieutenant colonel the following year.

In June 1800, he was appointed sergeant major of the Burgos Regiment and saw action in the War of the Oranges in 1801, with the 5th Division. In 1803 he was promoted to commander of the 3rd Battalion of Extremadura, and to colonel that same year.

In May 1804, Grimarest was appointed commander of the Provincias Internas of New Spain and chief inspector of the Texas Tercios. Sailing with Federico Gravina's squadron in 1805, he was unable to reach his destination. Returning to Spain, he took part in the Battle of Cape Finisterre (July 1805), where he was taken prisoner when the 74-gun Ferme was captured and taken to England and used as a prison hulk.

On his return to Spain, he was promoted to Infantry brigadier and in Andalusia organised the Texas Tercios.

== Peninsular War ==
At the start of the Peninsular War, Grimarest was appointed second-in-command of Marquis of Coupigny's 2nd Division at Bailen (July 1808). The following month he was promoted to field marshal and given the command of the 2nd Division of the Army of Andalusia when Coupigny was given a new command.

Grimarest's 2nd Andalusian Division, now forming part of General Castaños's Army of the Centre, was defeated by Marshal Moncey at Lerín (25 October). When Grimarest retreated, he abandoned his vanguard, commanded by Colonel Cruz-Murgeon, which found itself surrounded by Morlot's division. The Spanish colonel took refuge in the castle at Lerín with his troops, all new levies, and consisting of a single Andalusian battalion, the Tiradores de Cadiz, and a few Catalan volunteers. They defended themselves there for two days, expecting Grimarest to come to their rescue, but he was decided not to. Cruz-Murgeon finally surrendered after two-thirds of his troops had been killed or wounded. Grimarest was reprimanded for his defeat at Lerín and again for his conduct the following November at Tudela, where he failed to carry out the orders given him. During his retreat to Cuenca in December, his division was dispersed by Montbrun's Cavalry.

In 1809 he was appointed major general of Infantry and Cavalry of the Army of La Mancha under the Count of Cartaojal, who commissioned him with the defence of the Puerto del Rey, one of the natural mountain passes to the west of Despeñaperros, in the Sierra Morena that separates Castile-La Mancha, the central part of Spain, from Andalusia, in the south of the peninsula, and whose defiles have always had great military importance.

In June 1809, he commanded the 5,544 troops of the 3rd Division of General Venegas's Army of La Mancha.

In July 1809, the Junta Central gave him the command of the Army of the Reserve in Écija, although he was substituted three months later by General Carvajal. When Grimarest protested, he was given back his command in November, only for it to be given to Carvajal the following month.

In March 1810, Grimarest was transferred to the 3rd Army until the end of December, when he was appointed military governor of Menorca. In January 1811 he went to Cádiz, where he was told to either take up his new post or be confined to a castle. He finally took up the posting in September 1811.

At the beginning of February 1812, he returned to Cádiz, and the following July was appointed commander of Niebla. At the end of August he was appointed interim governor of Seville, post he held until the beginning of February 1813, when he was appointed governor of Ceuta, post he held until 1817.

== Post-war ==
In September 1819, he was given the command of the Ciudadela of Barcelona but was relieved of his command in March 1820, with the instauracion of the Trienio Liberal. Due to his extremist royalist views, Grimarest was persecuted by the liberals in Seville and confined to barracks at Ibiza, from where he escaped, and was dismissed from the army.

With the return of Fernando VII, Grimarest was promoted to lieutenant general and appointed inspector general of the provincial militias provinciales (December 1823), and shortly thereafter, captain general of Aragón (January 1824). At the end of that year, he was appointed commander general of Guipúzcoa, until July 1825, when he was transferred, without command, to the barracks at Valladolid and then on to Seville, where he was appointed sub-inspector of the Royalist Volunteers.

In August 1833, having been involved in a Carlist plot, Grimarest was stripped of honours, salary, employment and decorations and sentenced to eight years' confinement at San Sebastián and then at La Coruña. In April 1835, he was transferred to Cádiz, and the following year was deported to Manila, where he died while being transferred to the Mariana Islands.
