= Arturo O'Neill =

Spanish Army officer and colonial administrator

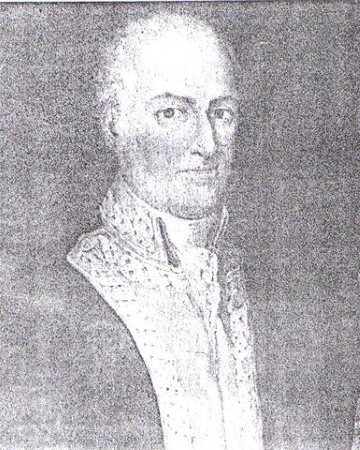

Governor of West Florida
- In office May 9, 1781 – November 1792/1794
- Preceded by: Peter Chester (British West Florida (1770–1781))
- Succeeded by: Carlos Howard

Governor of Yucatán
- In office December 13, 1792 – October 19, 1800
- Lieutenant: Benito Pérez Valdelomar
- Preceded by: Jose Sabido de Vargas

Personal details
- Born: Arthur O'Neill; January 8, 1736 Dublin, Ireland
- Died: December 9, 1814 (aged 78) Madrid
- Profession: Military and political career

Arturo O'Neill de Tyrone y O'Kelly (January 8, 1736 – December 9, 1814) was a Spanish Army officer and colonial administrator. He came from a lineage that occupied prominent European positions and titles, since at least the 12th century.

== Biography ==
=== Early years and military career ===
Arturo (Arthur) O'Neill was born in Dublin, Ireland (although his ancestors were from County Tyrone, now in Northern Ireland), on January 8, 1736. He was the third of five children of Henry O’Neill and Ana O’Kelly. One of his brothers was Lieutenant Colonel Niall O'Neill (later Nicolás O'Neill y O'Kelley). His family lost their lands in Ireland, which forced them to emigrate. His parents carried Arturo and his brothers to Spain. In 1752, O'Neill joined the Irish regiment in Ireland, as a cadet under the command of his cousin, the regimental commander José Camerford.

The following year, O'Neill was transferred to the Regiment of Hibernia, to which he belonged for the next 28 years of his military career. In addition, he was sub-lieutenant for nine years, and he attained the ranks of lieutenant general and field marshal. He served in the campaign of Portugal in 1762. Later, he was part of the garrison of Oran, Algeria, and, in 1775, he participated in the military campaign of Algiers. He was also involved in the campaign against Brazil, which contributed to the seizure of Fort Santa Cruz, Santa Catalina Island, where he served as governor until the end of the war.

His military skills enabled him to obtain a promotion to Assistant Major of the Hibernia Regiment in 1764. In addition, in 1773, while serving in Pamplona, Spain, O'Neill obtained the rank of captain of the regiment. O'Neil was promoted to colonel of the regiment, after serving with distinction against the British at the Siege of Pensacola in March 1781.

=== Governor of West Florida ===
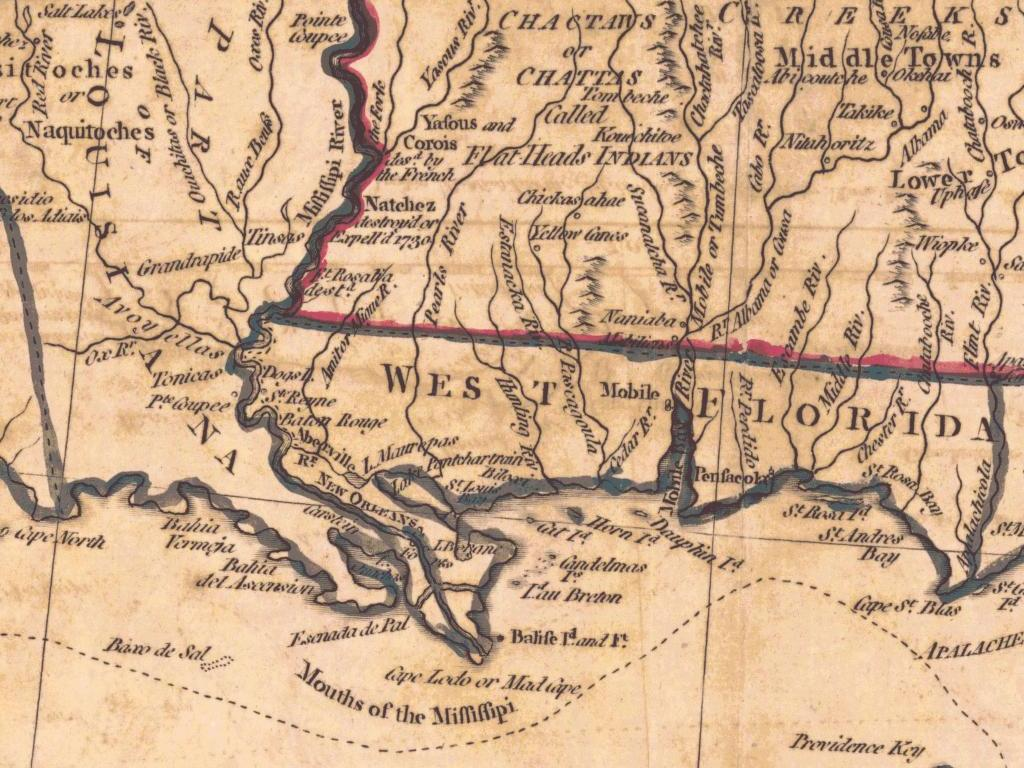
Map of West Florida and Louisiana, published in 1781, year in which O'Neill began his government in West Florida

At the battle's conclusion on May 9, 1781, he was appointed governor of Spanish West Florida in the service of New Spain, proving to be an effective diplomat and an able administrator. Later he became a member of the Supreme War Council and a lieutenant general of allies against Napoleon, replacing Governor Miguel de Uztaraiz on the council.

In late May or early June 1784, O'Neill participated in the Creek Conference, during which Spain and the Creeks signed a treaty of friendship. In addition, Creeks, Chickasaws, and Cherokees sought help from O'Neill to defend against American encroachment or invasion, so the military commandant and governor sent reinforcements to the areas of these peoples. In 1786, McGillivray informed O'Neill that the Americans were trying to make friends with the Creeks. So, fearing that the alliance could be detrimental to West Florida, Spanish officials negotiated another treaty with Native Americans in Mobile. (At that time, West Florida extended all the way to the Mississippi River, exclusive of New Orleans.)

In late 1787, O'Neill, based on the fact that he had ruled Florida for six years (when five was customary), asked the Spanish crown if he might ascend to the title of brigadier and be appointed the Governor of Puerto Rico or to a similar position. He did not receive the requested transfer.

O'Neill's health began to fail in 1788, and he requested a temporary leave of absence in order to recover. The crown accepted and replaced O'Neill as governor for the interim by Francisco Cruzat, former lieutenant governor of St. Louis. In addition, O'Neill was promoted to brigadier general in 1789.

When O'Neill returned to Pensacola the following year, he organized the Third Battalion of the Regiment of Louisiana Infantry to strengthen its military position. On March 10, 1792, O'Neill became Marqués del Norte (Marquess of the North).

In order to defend Florida and help the guard there, he recommended creating at least six Amerindian companies formed by 100 soldiers each. Along with Amerindians, the mestizos also belonged to those companies. O'Neill wanted to increase the number of mestizos, proposing marriage between the Spanish and the Native Americans, because he considered that mestizo people kept a more friendly relationship with whites. To do this, he planned to send a missionary to the Native American villages and encourage miscegenation between the Christian Amerindians and the Spanish. In addition, he considered mestizos an important group in terms of the military and the economy.

He left the office of Governor of West Florida in November 1792, and was succeeded by Carlos Howard.

=== Governor of Yucatán and last years ===
On December 13, 1792, he was appointed governor and captain general of Yucatán, and Intendent de Tabasco y la Laguna de Términos. On January 20, 1793, the office of governor was expanded. During his government, he took urgent measures to prevent the spread of the rabies, which came to represent a public health risk in the Yucatán. He expanded the supply of teachers for schools and also had to tackle smuggling that was done from across the province of Cuba and the islands the Caribbean Sea.

O'Neill carried out the seizure of the ship La Bella Jane in San Francisco de Campeche. O'Neill wrote a book entitled Description, population and census of the Province of Yucatán in New Spain in 1795, which was never printed. In 1798, he led an unsuccessful attack on British colonial settlements in Belize in the Battle of St. George's Caye. The Spanish force under his command attempted to force their way into the settlements and rout the Baymen (British settlers), but proved unable to do so. After two hours of confused fighting, the Spanish retreated, with neither side sustaining a single casualty.

He served as governor of Yucatán until October 19, 1800, when he gave the charge to Benito Perez Valdelomar. Back in Madrid, he was appointed Minister of the Royal and Supreme Council of War. His last position was as a soldier in the army of Spain against France during the Napoleonic Wars. He was promoted, in October 1802, to lieutenant general in the same promotion as other notable Spanish military commanders of the Spanish armies during the Peninsular War, including the Duke of the Infantado, Manuel Lapeña, Juan Carrafa, Francisco Castaños, Francisco Taranco, Francisco Eguía, and Juan Pignatelli.

O’Neill died in Madrid on December 9, 1814, and was buried in a niche in the cemetery of the Puerta de los Pozos. He was unmarried and had no children.

== See also ==
- O'Neill dynasty
