= Francisco Taranco y Llano =

Spanish military commander

Francisco Taranco y Llano (date of birth unknown – January or March 1808) was a Spanish military officer and Captain-General of Galicia.

== Biography ==
After serving in the Americas, including, in 1769, as a cadet under Alejandro O'Reilly, the second Spanish governor of colonial Louisiana, Taranco returned to peninsular Spain in 1783 and was given the command of the Regiment of Soria, with which he later served under the orders of General Ricardos in the War of the Pyrenees. He saw further military actions against French Imperial troops in Catalonia.

Following his participation in the War of the Oranges, in which French and Spanish forces invaded Portugal, Taranco was appointed Captain-General of Galicia (around 1802).

He was promoted, in October 1802, to lieutenant general in the same promotion as other notable Spanish military commanders of the Spanish armies during the Peninsular War, including the Duke of the Infantado, Manuel Lapeña, Juan Carrafa, Francisco Castaños, Juan Pignatelli, Francisco Eguía, and Arturo O'Neill.

With the signing of the Treaty of Fontainebleau (October 1807), under the terms of which France and Spain would divide Portugal into three regions, Taranco was sent to assist the French General Junot by invading the province of Entre-Douro-e-Minho and establishing his headquarters at Porto. According to treaty, Taranco would lead a force of some ten thousand Spanish troops. However, the order of battle of Junot's Army of Portugal for November 1807, referred to Taranco's infantry division as being made up of some 6,500 men and 12 cannon. (Note: Spanish military historian José Gómez de Arteche, in his Guerra de la Independencia: historia militar de España de 1808 a 1814 (1868), initially puts it at 25 cannon but later at 12 pieces.)

Entering Portugal from Galicia, on 10 December 1807, Taranco crossed the Minho to occupy the territory between the Minho and the Duero and, after leaving a battalion to garrison the fortress at Viana do Castelo, reached Porto on 13 December 1807, and where he died the following January or March. His command in Portugal was given to General Domingo Ballesta and his Captaincy-General in Galicia was given to Francisco de Biedma y Zayas.
