= Domingo Belestá =

Spanish military officer

- Born: 4 March 1741; Alicante, Spain
- Died: 7 December 1819 (aged 78) Cádiz, Spain
- Conflicts: American Revolutionary War; Anglo-Spanish War (1779–1783); Great Siege of Gibraltar; Invasion of Minorca; War of the Oranges; Peninsular War

Domingo Belestá y Pared (Alicante, 4 March 1741 – Cádiz, 7 December 1819) was a Spanish military engineer who served in the American Revolutionary, French Revolutionary and Peninsular wars. His surname also appears in the literature of the Peninsular War misspelt as Bellesta or Ballesta.

After enlisting as a Cadet in 1761 in Spain's Regimiento de Infantería de Flandes, where he was promoted to second lieutenant, in 1765 Belestá went on to study Mathematics at Spain's military engineering school, the Real Academia Militar de Matemáticas y Fortificación, in Barcelona. Promoted to captain in 1778, he stayed on at the Academy, where he taught Drawing, until 1781.

== American Revolutionary War ==
During the Anglo-Spanish War (1779–1783), part of the American Revolutionary War, Belestá participated at the siege of St. Philip's Castle, in Menorca, under the orders of the Duke of Crillon and from there went on to the Great Siege of Gibraltar. At the conclusion of the siege, Belestá was promoted to lieutenant-colonel in 1783 and was sent to supervise the construction of the roads from Málaga to Velez and to Antequera, as well as working on the San Telmo Aqueduct then being constructed in Málaga. Around that time he was also involved in the construction of the Explanada Boulevard in Barcelona, the ongoing works on one of the three branches of the Canal de Castilla, and works on the port at Melilla, among other projects.

== Inter-war years ==
At the behest of General Melville, the Society of Antiquaries of London requested the Real Academia de la Historia to find the exact location of the legendary Battle of Munda, for which, in 1791, Belestá was commissioned to lead the first field trip ever carried out in Spain to that end. Although he was unable to reach a conclusion as to its exact whereabouts, he was able to refute the traditional belief that the battle had been fought at Monda, in Málaga.

Promoted to colonel in 1794, he was appointed director of the Real Academia he had studied at in Barcelona. He held the post until its closure in 1802 and transferred to Madrid. During that time he was also promoted to Chief Engineer (1797) and later, in 1801, during the War of the Oranges, he was sent to participate in the siege at Elvas.

In 1802 he was put in charge of the restoration works of Barcelona's royal palace, the Palau Reial Major, and later that year he was given the command of the fortifications along the borders of Old Castile in the province of Zamora.

== Peninsular War ==
In 1808, now a field marshal, Belestá was the chief of staff of the Spanish forces sent, together with General Junot's Army of Portugal, to occupy Portugal. Following the sudden death of General Taranco at the beginning of the year, Belestá took command of the latter's headquarters at Porto, However, when, on 6 June 1808, the news of the uprising in Madrid and the subsequent revolt in La Coruña and elsewhere in Spain, reached Belestá, he arrested the French governor, General of Division Quesnel, together with his 75-man escort. After proclaiming the independence of Portugal, Belestá then marched the 6,000 troops of Taranco's Division, plus his prisoners, back north to Galicia to join the Spanish forces fighting the French.

Taken prisoner by Marshal of the Empire Soult's French forces at La Coruña, in January 1809, Belestá managed to escape and reported for duty to the Marquis of La Romana, whose 9,000-strong division had disembarked at Santander towards the end of the previous year and had been incorporated into Blakes's Army of Galicia which, itself, would later be incorporated under La Romana's future Army of the Left, and had worked its way towards La Coruña as the rearguard of General Moore's retreat to La Coruña. However, on 27 October 1810, Belestá was sentenced to six months' duties without command before being re-instated to his previous rank of field marshal and transferred to Spain's Army of Catalonia. However, before he take up his post, he was appointed Director of Engineers in Andalucía, based in Granada. In May 1814 he supported that city's uprising in favour of Fernando VII as an absolute monarch.

== Death ==
Belestá died of yellow fever in 1819.
