= Manuel Lapeña =

Spanish Army officer (1762–1820)

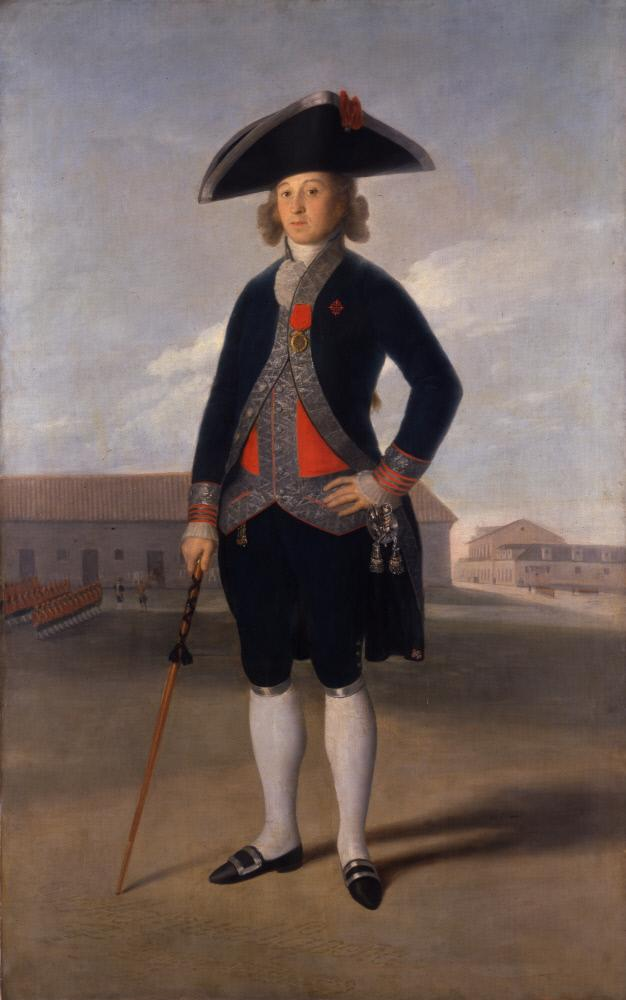
- Portrait by Francisco Goya, 1799
- Born: 11 April 1762; Valtierra, Navarre
- Died: 14 October 1820 (aged 58); Madrid, Spain
- Military career
- Allegiance: Spain
- Branch: Spanish Army
- Conflicts: American Revolutionary War; Great Siege of Gibraltar; War of the Pyrenees; Battle of Mas Deu; Battle of Perpignan; Battle of Truillas; Second Battle of Boulou; Peninsular War; Battle of Bailén; Battle of Tudela; Battle of Barrosa; Siege of Cádiz

Manuel de Lapeña y Ruiz del Sotillo (Note: Some authors, such as Oman (1902), write the surname La Peña.) (11 April 1762 – 14 October 1820) was a Spanish Army officer.

Having a reputation for incompetence—he had the nickname Doña Manuela (Lady Manuela) (Note: "La Peña had kept his place, despite his Tudela fiasco, through family and salon intrigues—he is said to have been the 'tame cat' of certain great ladies of the patriotic party".Oman 1911, footnote 135)— Lapeña was the subject of harsh criticism by 19th-century British historians including William Napier and Charles Oman for his conduct at the battles of Tudela and Barrosa, (Note: "... the cowardly behaviour of La Peña in 1811, when he refused to aid Graham at the bloody little battle of Barossa". (Oman, 1902: p. 101.)) considering him both pusilanimous and lacking initiative, opinions shared by 19th century Spanish historians such as the Count of Toreno and Gómez Arteche. An ambitious man, he had a talent for diplomacy.

The full-length portrait of Lapeña, painted in 1799 by Goya, was commissioned by the Duchess of Osuna for the palace at her recreational property, La Alameda, Madrid.

== Military career ==
Lapeña started his military career in 1777 as a captain in the America Infantry Regiment, then commanded by the future Duke of Osuna.

He then spent 22 months at the Great Siege of Gibraltar before participating in the Invasion of Minorca (1781). He saw further action at the siege at Gibraltar, following which he was promoted to lieutenant colonel in 1792.

At the start of the War of the Pyrenees, Lapeña joined the Army of Rosellón as aide-de-camp to the Duke of Osuna, seeing action at Mas Deu, at Perpignan, at Truillas and at Boulou.

He was promoted to brigadier in 1793, and marched with his commanding officer to Army of Navarra, where Lapeña was given command of the seven battalions of volunteers that had been raised for the war. Shortly before the end of the war, he was promoted to field marshal (1795).

In 1797 he spent a year in Galicia as second-in-command of the army stationed there in preparation for a war against Portugal. In 1801, he led an infantry brigade in the War of the Oranges, seeing action at Arronches.

In October 1802, Lapeña was promoted to lieutenant general in the same promotion as other notable Spanish military commanders of the Spanish armies during the Peninsular War, including the Duke of the Infantado, Juan Pignatelli, Juan Carrafa, Francisco Castaños, Francisco Taranco, Francisco Eguía, and Arturo O'Neill.

In 1806 Lapeña was given command of the 2nd Battalion of the Guardias Españolas and, in 1807 he was appointed interim captain general of Andalusia and governor of Cádiz while the Marquis del Socorro was invading Portugal as part of Spain's agreement with France. Lapeña held the post until 20 May 1808.

== Peninsular War ==
=== Battle of Bailén (16–19 July 1808) ===
Lapeña was given command of the 4th Division (Reserve) of Castaños's 33,000–34,000-strong field army. (Note: The commanders of the other three divisions were Generals Reding, Coupigny, and Felix Jones. (Oman, 1902: p. 177.))

Lapeña's Cavalry unit was the Pavia Regiment commanded by Colonel Pedro de Alcántara Téllez Girón, a very well-equipped unit with 440 splendid horses. (Note: Oman (1902: p. 619.) puts this number at 541 in the order of battle.) The 4th Division also had a 3,000-strong flying brigade, under Cruz-Murgeon, who was given the task harassing Dupont's northern flank and cutting French communications with Bailén and La Carolina.

Following their victory at Bailén, Lapeña's division accompanied Castaños to Madrid, arriving there on 23 August.

=== Battle of Tudela (23 November 1808) ===
Castaños's Army of the Centre came under attack from the French III Corps commanded by Marshal Lannes at Tudela. The attacking French forces sought to take advantage of a gap between the Spanish army's wings. Seeking to close the gap, Castaños sent orders to Lapeña at Cascante to move to fill the void. However, Lapeña's division, numbering 8,000–9,000 infantry and 1,500 horse, simply stayed for four hours facing the French cavalry; just two French Digeon's and Colbert's brigades of dragoons, some three thousand horse.

At the time Lapeña, along with General Grimarest, could field some 20,000 men against the 9,000 French troops in that area of the field of battle. Rather than march to support the rest of the Spanish army, Lapeña limited his activities to small-scale skirmishes with the few French troops close by. Having lost 200 men in these skirmishes, and witnessing the defeat of the rest of the Army of the Centre, Lapeña finally retreated towards Borja, bringing the battle to a close.

=== Army of the Centre ===
After Tudela, Castaños was ordered to Aranjuez to take up the presidency of the Junta Central's military advisory committee. As a result, Lapeña assumed overall command of the Spanish Army of the Centre which had reformed at Guadalajara. With this command, Lapeña attempted to intervene against Napoleon's assault on Madrid; this attempt was, however, intercepted by Marshal Ney's I Corps and Lapeña was forced to withdraw to Cuenca. Once there, he was replaced as the commander of the Army of the Centre by the Duque de Infantado, on 9 December.

=== Army of La Mancha ===
In January 1809 he was given command of the 4,000-strong Reserve of Cartaojal's Army of La Mancha, and following its defeat at Ciudad Real covered the retreat to Despeñaperros.

In April he went to Sevilla, where the Junta Central commissioned him with a secret mission to Catalonia, where he stayed until the following April, to report on the flight of the Spanish troops at Belchite.

=== Cádiz ===
In December 1810, Lapeña succeeded Blake as the Captain General of Andalusia. However, as he had been a supporter of the Cadiz Cortes, the new Regency removed him from this position and ordered him to Cádiz, along with his troops. Lapeña then became the senior Spanish officer at Cádiz, and took command of the Spanish forces on the Isla de León.

=== Battle of Barrosa ===
In January 1811, a reduction of the French forces besieging Cádiz led to the British and Spanish allies garrisoning the city to launch an expedition in an attempt to raise the siege. Despite having authority, from the British government, to refuse to take part in a joint expedition of which he was not given command, Sir Thomas Graham—the British commander—agreed to cede command of the force to Lapeña, on condition that the Spanish contribute the larger body of troops.

Sailing from Cádiz between 21–24 February 1811, the Anglo-Spanish expedition regrouped at Tarifa on 27 February 1811 and marched towards the besieging French force's rear at Chiclana. A series of night marches, instigated by Lapeña, however, resulted in a change of plan and the allied army ended up marching back towards Cádiz. The French commander, Marshal Victor, marched to meet the allied force with 10,000 men from his besieging army. On 5 March, Lapeña's vanguard division met a French division straddling the main road to Cádiz and drove them off the road.

Graham's rearguard division, meanwhile, was attacked by two of Victor's divisions. Graham split his force into two brigades; one to face each of the approaching French divisions. In the ensuing battle, Graham's forces beat off the French attacks despite Lapeña entrenching his larger force on the isthmus to Cádiz and refusing to aid his British allies. Lapeña further refused to pursue the retreating French troops, allowing them to resume the siege on Cádiz, a siege that was not lifted until 24 August 1812.

Lapeña's actions in this engagement led to his court-martial, where he was acquitted but relieved of command, which was given to Marquis de Coupigny.

== Bibliography ==
- Esdaile, Charles (2003), The Peninsular War, Penguin Books, ISBN 0-14-027370-0;
- Fortescue, John William (1917), A History of the British Army, vol. VIII, Macmillan;
- Gates, David (2002), The Spanish Ulcer: A History of the Peninsular War, Pimlico, ISBN 0-7126-9730-6;
- Napier, William (1842), History of the War in the Peninsula, vol. II (Fourth ed.), Carey and Hart;
- Napier, William (1840), History of the War in the Peninsula, vol. III (Third ed.), Thomas and William Boone;
- Paget, Julian (2005), Wellington's Peninsular War; Battles And Battlefields, Pen & Sword Military, ISBN 1-84415-290-1.
