= Francisco Javier Castaños, 1st Duke of Bailén =

Spanish Army officer and politician

The Most Excellent The Duke of Bailén GE
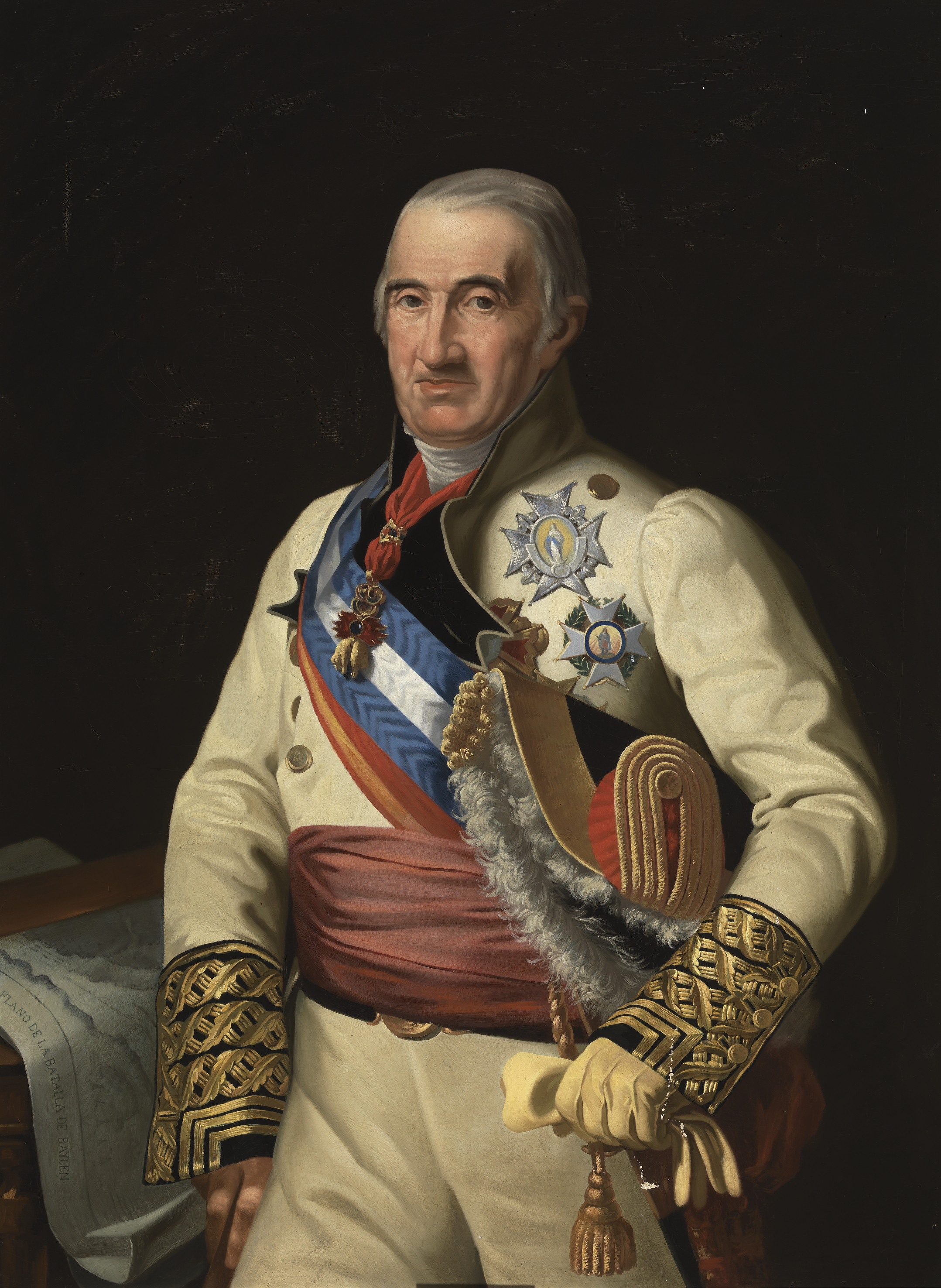
- Portrait by José María Galván y Candela, c. 1880 (Note: This portrait, by José María Galván y Candela, is a copy (c. 1880) of an original by José de Madrazo y Agudo (c. 1830). (Museo del Prado.))

President of the Regency Council
- In office 1 February 1810 – 29 May 1810
- Monarch: Fernando VII
- Preceded by: Office established
- Succeeded by: Pedro de Quevedo y Quintano

1st Speaker of the House of Peers
- In office 10 April 1834 – 12 July 1835
- Preceded by: Office established
- Succeeded by: The Duke of Ahumada

Personal details
- Born: Francisco Javier Castaños Aragorri; 24 September 1758 Madrid, Spain
- Died: 22 April 1852 (aged 93) Madrid, Spain
- Resting place: Pantheon of Illustrious Men (1852–1963); Parish Church of the Incarnation, Bailén (1963–present)
- Profession: Army general and politician
- Awards: Knight of the Order of the Golden Fleece; Grand Cross of the Order of Charles III

Military service
- Allegiance: Spain
- Branch/service: Spanish Army
- Years of service: 1774–1852
- Rank: Captain general of the Army
- Battles/wars: War of the Pyrenees; Anglo-Spanish War (1796–1808); Napoleonic Wars; Peninsular War

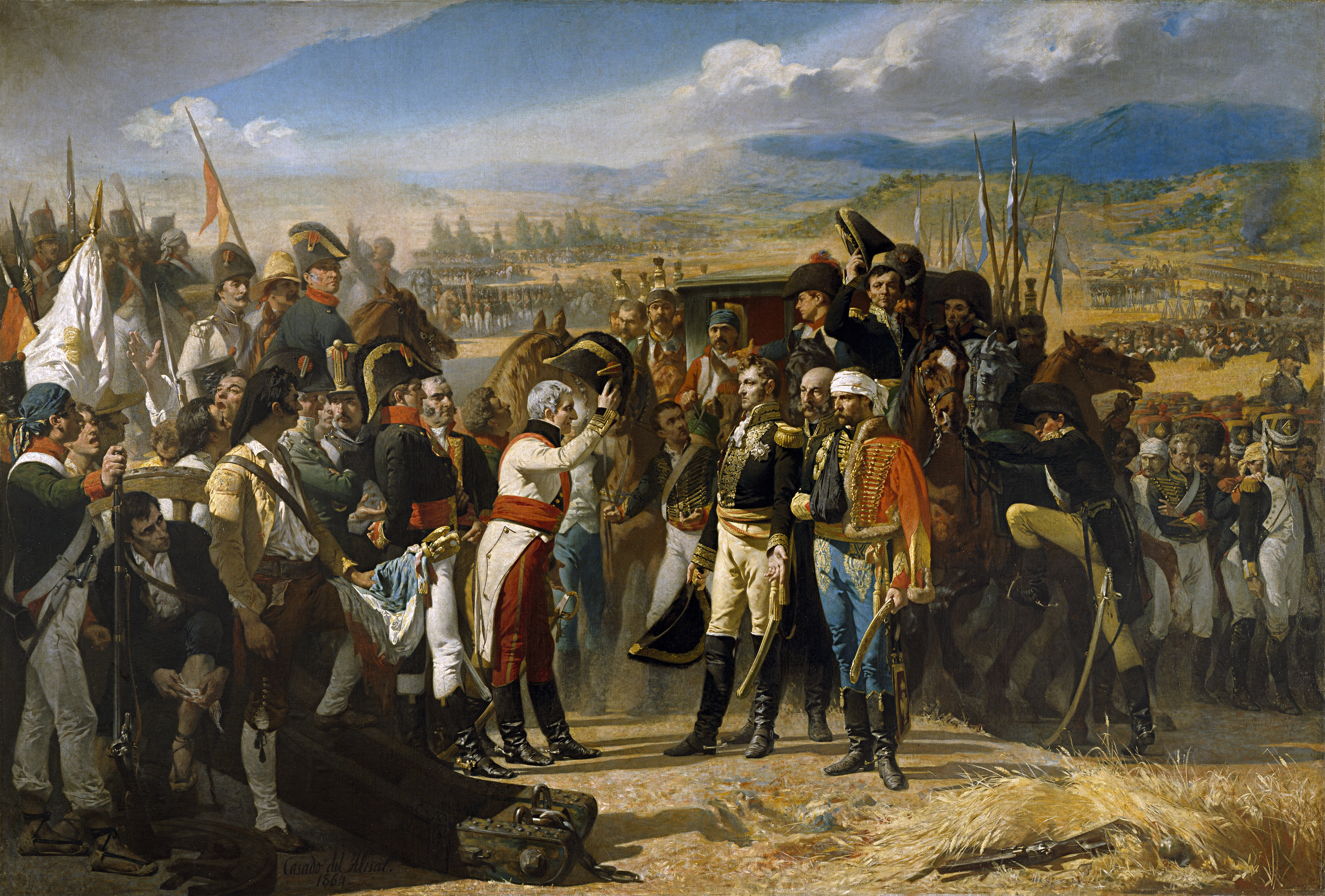
The Surrender of Bailén, by José Casado del Alisal, Prado Museum, Madrid, Spain. Castaños is in the white uniform.

Francisco Javier Castaños Aragorri, 1st Duke of Bailén (24 September 1758 – 22 April 1852) was a Spanish Army officer and politician who served in the French Revolutionary and Napoleonic Wars. He presided over the Regency Council of Spain and the Indies (de facto head of state), in 1810. From July to September 1834, Castaños served as the first president of the Senate of Spain, at that time called the House of Peers.

Castaños is remembered for his victory over the French under Dupont, whom he surrounded and compelled to surrender at the decisive Battle of Bailen in 1808, where the Napoleonic army was defeated in the open field for the first time and which led to King Joseph having to abandon Madrid at the end of that same month. Just months later he led his army to a decisive defeat at the Battle of Tudela. After this he served under Wellington in several engagements, and was commander of the Spanish army, if required, to invade France in 1815.

In 1833, Ferdinand VII created him Duke of Bailén, to honour his actions during the Peninsular War and, especially, at the Battle of Bailén.

== Biography ==
=== Early career ===
He was promoted, in October 1802, to lieutenant general in the same promotion as other future notable Spanish military commanders of the Spanish armies during the Peninsular War, including the Duke of the Infantado, Manuel Lapeña, Juan Carrafa, Juan Pignatelli, Francisco Taranco, Francisco Eguía, and Arturo O'Neill, among others.

=== Peninsular War ===
His victory over Dupont French troops at Bailen (19 July 1808), in the early stages of the war, was the first time the Napoleonic army had ever been defeated in the open field and led to King Joseph having to abandon Madrid at the end of that month.

On returning to Seville, Castaños was appointed captain general and preparations were made for the Spanish army to enter Madrid mid-August.

Having been given command of the Army of the Centre, which he joined at Tudela in mid-October, his troops were heavily defeated there at the following month the Battle of Tudela (23 November 1808). Castaños withdrew towards Somosierra, north of Madrid, to cut off Napoleon's advance on Madrid, but he was relieved of his command and made to go to Seville, where the Supreme Junta was now based, and from there, on to Algeciras to await the court martial for his defeat.

=== Post-war career ===
Following Napoleon's flight from Elba, and the start of the Hundred Days, Castaños was given command of the Army of Observation of the Right and crossed into Roussillon. With Napoleon defeated at Waterloo, Castaños was appointed captain general of Catalonia.

In 1837 he was appointed senator for the province of Barcelona, seat he held until 1845, apart from the period 1841–1844. In 1845 he was appointed senator for life.

Castaños died in Madrid in 1852. Isabella II attended the funeral service and her husband, the king consort Francisco de Asís, Duke of Cádiz accompanied the coffin from San Isidro el Real to Nuestra Señora de Atocha, where the Duke was entombed.

== Bibliography ==
- Esdaile, Charles J. (2003). The Peninsular War: A New History. MacMillan. ISBN 978-1-4039-6231-7.
