= Urgel Regency =

Short period in Spanish history

The Urgel Regency (in Spanish: Regencia de Urgel) was an interim government, or interregnum, expressly authorised by Fernando VII towards the end of May 1822.

It was formed on 14 or 15 August 1822, during the Liberal Triennium (Trienio Liberal), by the Spanish absolutists, or Royalists, supporters of Fernando VII, who opposed the Constitutional Government that (basing itself on the Spanish Constitution of 1812) had resulted from the Spanish Revolution of 1820.

The Regency's leading figures were Bernardo Mozo de Rosales, Marquis of Mataflorida; Baron de Eroles; and Jaime Creux, Archbishop-elect of Tarragona.

Based in Seo de Urgel, the city-fortress taken by Royalist forces some weeks earlier, the Urgel Regency was one of the major outcomes of Spain's 1822-1823 civil war, the conflict resulting from the uprising of the Royalists who rejected the 1812 Constitution and wanted to restore the absolute monarchy.

The Regency was presided over by the Marquis de Mataflorida, who had agreed to forming a government in the “liberated” zone, that is, one not controlled by the liberal government headed by the "exaltado" Evaristo San Miguel.

== Congress of Verona (1822) ==
Despite Wellington having assured the British Foreign Secretary, George Canning, on 18 October 1822, that "all notion of what is called a European army, or any offensive operation against Spain, is at an end", on 20 October 1822, at the first working session of the Congress of Verona, attended by Wellington; Nesselrode, the Russian foreign minister and a leading European conservative statesman of the Holy Alliance; Montmorency, known for his strong reactionary, ultramontane, and Ultra-royalist views; Bernstorff, considered to have subordinated the particular interests of Prussia to the European policy of Metternich and the Holy Alliance; and Klemens von Metternich. The meeting, held at Metternich's apartment, dealt with two matters concerning Spain, the second of which was a letter, dated 11 September, signed by the Marquis of Mataflorida and the Archbishop of Tarragona. Read by Carlos de España, as envoy of the Urgel Regency, the letter requested the allied sovereigns' aid "to restore the King to his throne and to reestablish all things as they had been before March 9, 1820".

Of the five members of the Alliance, only Russia was initially willing to invade Spain and the petition was shelved, for the time being. Later, however, when four of the five allies advocated invading Spain, Wellington posed the following: "Let us suppose that you are already in Madrid and that only two battles have been required to take you there, what would you do then? Would you overthrow the constitution, or would you let it stand?".

The Regency came to an end when Francisco Espoz y Mina led the Government offensive at the head of the Constitutionalist Army in autumn-winter of 1822-1823, forcing the Royalist Regency to flee across the border into France.

== Final days of the Regency ==
Despite counting on the initial support of the Holy Alliance, the Regency generated tension among the different factions of Royalists, with some leading military figures of the day, such as Francisco de Eguía and his supporters, even declaring war against Mataflorida and his Regency with the publication of A la España realista y a las demás naciones de Europa (To Royalist Spain and the Other Nations of Europe.).

Due, in part, to the mounting pressure from the liberal military forces, the three leaders were finally forced to flee Spain in November 1822, via Puigcerdá and Llivia, escorted by 300 troops of the so-called Regency Battalion, and head to Toulouse, arriving there in December 1822.

In mid-February 1823, they met up in Perpignan with the intention of renewing their activities and in mid-March they returned to Toulouse to meet up with Louis Antoine, Duke of Angoulême, who would soon (that same April) lead the "Hundred Thousand Sons of Saint Louis", comprising some five army corps, but actually only numbering some 60,000 troops, to invade Spain to help the Spanish Royalists restore King Ferdinand VII to the throne.

== Background ==
On his return to Spain, at the end of the Peninsular War (1814), Fernando VII, despite having sworn to uphold the Constitution of Cádiz, behaved as a tyrant and despot, imposing the absolutism of the Antiguo Régimen. He not only rejected the Constitution he had sworn to uphold, but went out of his way to carry out a harsh repression and persecution of liberals and so-called afrancesados.

Rafael del Riego’s pronunciamiento of 1 January 1820 was the start of the Trienio Liberal, which ended in October 1823 when, with the approval of the crowned heads of Europe, a French army, known in Spain as "The Hundred Thousand Sons of St. Louis", and in France as the "Spanish Expedition" (expédition d’Espagne), invaded Spain, and Fernando VII was able to restore an absolute monarchy.

Riego was by no means the first who had tried to intervene in this represión. Before him, several notable public figures, such as Espoz y Mina, Richard, Renovales, Díaz Porlier (1815), Brigadier-general Lacy (1816) or Vidal (1819), had all failed, most of them at the cost of their lives.

== Cultural references ==
=== Benito Pérez Galdós ===
Benito Pérez Galdós refers to "the three regents" in his 1877 novel Los Cien Mil Hijos de San Luis (Hundred Thousand Sons of Saint Louis), part of his Episodios Nacionales. The following is an example:

These were the Baron de Eroles and don Jaime Creux, Archbishop of Tarragona, both of them, just like Mataflorida, from the humblest of classes, brought out of obscurity by these revolutionary times, which wasn't really a very strong argument in favour of absolutism. A Regency destined to re-establish the Throne and the Altar should be constituted of people of good breeding. But the times of commotion in which we lived meant otherwise, and even absolutism had to enlist its people from among the plebs. This fact, which had been observed since the previous century, was expressed by Louis XV, when he said that the nobility needed to be covered in manure in order to be made fertile.
Of these three regents, the most likeable was Mataflorida, who was also the most learned; the most tolerant was Eroles, and the most evil and unpleasant, Don Jaime Creux. It cannot be said that these men had been slow in developing their brilliant careers. Eroles was a student in 1808 and a lieutenant-general in 1816. The other, from obscure cleric, became a bishop, in reward for his betrayal of las Cortes in '14. (Pérez Galdós: Los Cien Mil Hijos de San Luis, 1877, p. 38.)

== See also ==
- Absolutism (European history)
