= Royalist War =

Civil war in Spain (1822–1823)

- Part of the Trienio Liberal
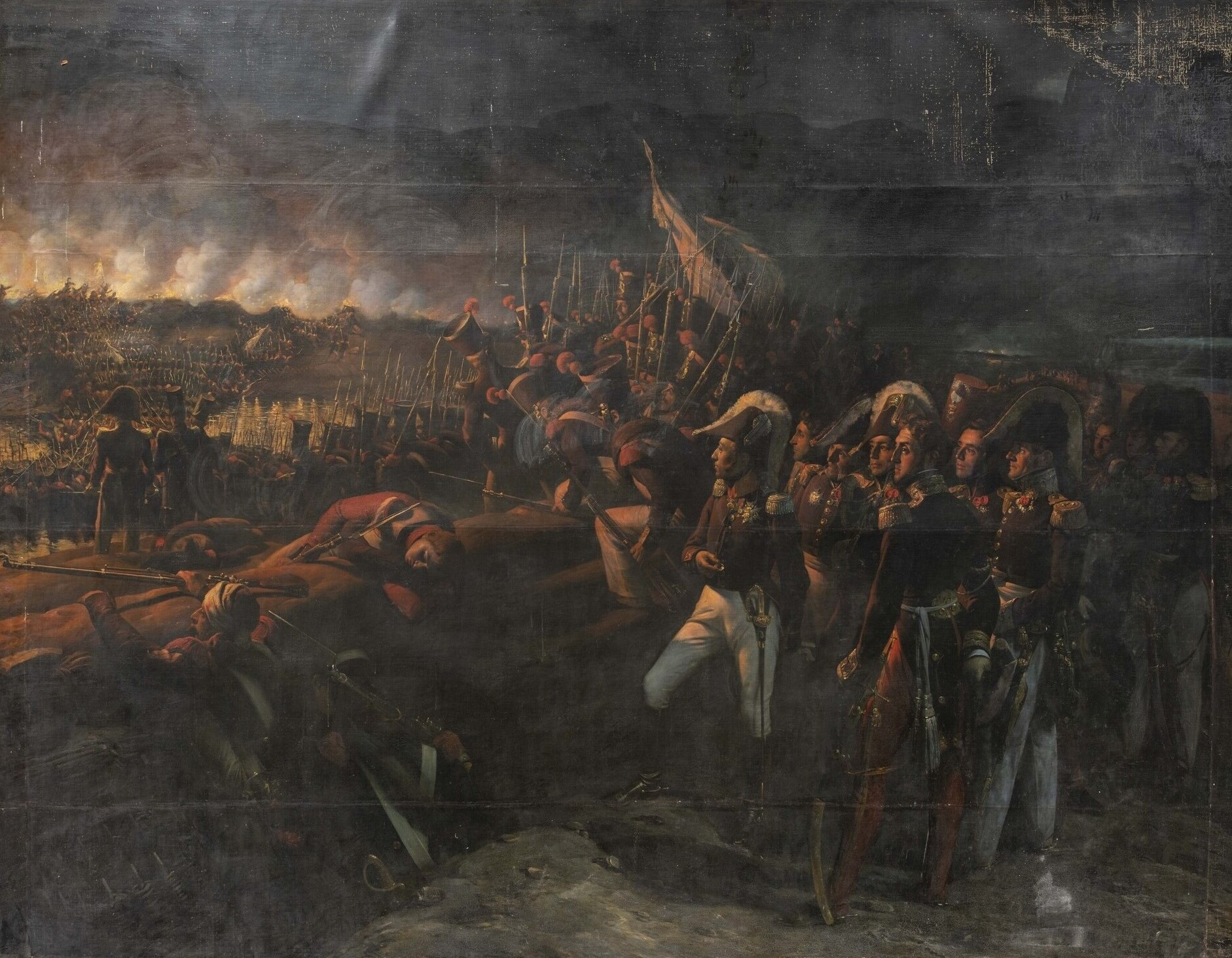
- Capture of Trocadero by the Duke of Angoulême, August 31, 1823; Paul Delaroche, 1824
Date	1822–1823
Location	Iberian Peninsula
Result	Absolutist victory

Belligerents
Kingdom of Spain; Royalists forces Spanish absolutists Ultras/Apostolics (traditionalists); Royalist Volunteers	Junta Provisional Consultiva; Liberals (constitucionals) forces Doceañista/Moderados (liberal conservatives); Exaltados (radical liberals)

Commanders and leaders
Joaquín Ibáñez; Carlos de España; Vicente Genaro; Jerónimo Merino	Miguel Ricardo de Álava; Francisco Ballesteros (surrendered); Francisco Espoz (surrendered); Juan Martín Díez (executed); Rafael del Riego (executed); Vicente Sancho (surrendered); José María (surrendered)

Strength
Unknown	Unknown

Casualties and losses
Unknown	Unknown

The Royalist War (Spanish: Guerra Realista), also called the civil war of 1822–1823, was an armed conflict that took place in Spain during the last year and a half of the Liberal Triennium. It began in the spring of 1822—there is no agreement among historians about the exact moment of its beginning—with the extension of the actions and the number of royalist parties that had already been acting since the spring of 1821 with the purpose to reestablish the absolute power of king Ferdinand VII. They were confronted by the constitutional armies that defended the liberal regime established after the triumph of the Revolution of 1820. Its fundamental setting was Catalonia, Navarra and Basque Country and in the first phase the royalist forces were defeated and were forced to take refuge in France (or Portugal). The war took a definitive turn in favor of the royalists when on April 7, 1823, the invasion of the French army of the Cien Mil Hijos de San Luis began, which had the support of reorganized Spanish royalist troops in France and of the royalist parties that had managed to survive the constitutionalist offensive. On September 30, 1823, King Ferdinand VII was "liberated" from his "captivity" and the next day he abolished the Constitution of 1812 and restored absolutism.

The civil war of 1822–1823 is considered by some authors to be the first civil war in the contemporary history of Spain, First Carlist War (1833–1840)— «characterized by the clash between revolution and counter-revolution. (Note: It was almost half a century of combats that involved several generations of Spaniards who learned their first knowledge of contemporary politics through war.) The royalists took up the motto "Religion, King and Country", used during the War of the Convention and by a sector of the "patriots"—the "serviles" identified with the Ancient Regime—during the War of Independence.

But not only the royalists resorted to religion to justify their positions and fight their enemies - they came to use the term Crusade to refer to the war they were fighting -, also the liberals. The liberal newspaper El Universal said that the friars who had joined the royalist rebellion "have given the sad and scandalous testimony of their irreligion, their immorality, their hypocrisy, their ingratitude." In this sense, it is no coincidence that the constitutional authorities of Barcelona decided to transfer the image of the Virgin of Montserrat to the city to prevent it from falling into the hands of the royalists.

== Background ==
The Riego pronouncement in Las Cabezas de San Juan had reestablished the Constitution of 1812, which Fernando VII swore for the first time on March 9, 1820. However, the «counter-revolution» began from that very moment, since Ferdinand VII never accepted the constitutional regime and from the beginning conspired to overthrow it.

The armed wing of the "counterrevolution" was the royalist parties, organized by absolutists exiled in France and connected to the Royal Palace. The methods and way of operating of the games were very similar to those used by the guerrilla during the War of Independence (precisely some of those guerrillas will now be active on the royalist side). Although some began to act in 1820, the royalist parties experienced great growth from the spring of 1821 (Note: The action of the royalist parties moved from the south (Andalusia) and the center of the peninsula (La Mancha) to the north: Galicia, Asturias, Castilla y León, Extremadura, the Basque Country, Navarra, Aragon; Valencian Country and Catalonia; and its number tripled between 1820 and 1821.) as a consequence of the connection of the counter-revolution of the old reactionary elites, with the "anti-revolution" of the popular classes "culturally and socially aggrieved by revolutionary and liberal praxis." «The confluence between the counterrevolution and the antirevolution under the hegemony of the former, formed the block that we call "royalist" because what unifies them is the fight against the constitutional system and the defense of absolute power of the king and the cultural hegemony of the Catholic Church». (Note: From the French Revolution politics ceased to be an exclusive matter of the elites and it became a mass issue, since it was necessary to have 'the people' or a part of it to achieve power. Revolutionaries and counter-revolutionaries tried to mobilize the popular classes.)

It will be precisely the Catholic Church, mostly opposed to the liberal regime due to the disentailment, that will play a decisive role in the formation and the consolidation of this alliance between the counterrevolutionary elites and the "antirevolutionary" popular strata. Among other reasons because it provided the royalist bloc with ideological support by developing a discourse of "religious war" that penetrated especially in the rural world.

And at the top of the counterrevolution was the king. Installed from March 1822 in the Palace of Aranjuez, he established in a more discreet way than in Madrid contacts and meetings with nobles, diplomats, high officials and soldiers opposed to the constitutional regime as well as with the ambassadors of the European monarchies. and with the nuncio of the Holy See. Also from there he entrusted secret missions outside of Spain to men he trusted. The king's role was, above all, "to provide coherence to the counterrevolution by providing the element that gave unity to the movement; that of a paternal king, loved by the people - so much so that he takes up arms in their defense - and stripped of his legitimate throne by a conspiring and sectarian minority." During the spring of 1822, the actions of the royalist partiesThey acted on favorable terrain: little constitutional military presence, growing poverty of the popular classes and negative effects of some liberal reforms on the peasants" and there were several attempts at absolutist rebellions that culminated in the failed coup d'état of July 1822, which was led by the king himself and starred by the Royal Guard.

== The war ==
=== The royalist offensive ===
From the spring of 1822, "the royalist parties converged into better organized battalions and spread throughout almost the entire territory, forming what was known as the "army of faith", which would number between 25,000 and 30,000 men. The royalist uprising was organized from exile and had a dense counterrevolutionary network in the interior (in whose summit would be placed by King Fernando VII). It spread in such a way that "during the summer and autumn in Catalonia, the Basque Country and Navarra there was a true civil war in which it was impossible to stay out of it, and from which the civilian population came out very poorly. from both sides: reprisals, requisitions, war contributions, looting, etc.». The Marquis of Miraflores wrote in his Historical-Critical Notes (1834) that Catalonia in «May and June already presented the sad appearance of a civil war», to which they joined Vizcaya and Guipúzcoa, infested with bands, and Aragon and Galicia, with bands of "100 to 200 men." Miraflores concluded that on the eve of the «Day of July 7» of 1822 «Spain offered the horrible spectacle of a bloody civil war».

The decisive event that started the civil war (or gave it the definitive impetus) was the takeover by the leaders of the royalist parties Romagosa and El Trappist, in command of a troop of two thousand men, from the fortress of the Seo de Urgel on June 21. The next day the Provisional Superior Board of Catalonia was established there, which strove to create a regular army and establish an administration in the interior areas of Catalonia occupied by the royalists. A month and a half later, on August 15, what would be known as the Urgell Regency was established there, «established at the request of the people» and «desiring to free the Nation and its King. of the cruel state in which they find themselves." "Both in strategic terms and in symbolic terms, the establishment of a capital that embodied the contestation of the constitutional regime was an important advance,” Pedro Rújula and Manuel Chust have pointed out. The idea of establishing a Regency had been defended by the marquis of Mataflorida —in fact in June he had received powers from the king to establish it— and it was also one of the demands of the French government to provide support to the royalists. The Regency was formed by Mataflorida himself, the baron of Eroles, and Jaime Creus, archbishop of Tarragona, advised by a small government formed by Antonio Gispert responsible for State, Fernando de Ortafà in War and Domingo María Barrafón, responsible for the rest of secretariats of the Office. The creation of the Regency was "justified" by the idea defended by the royalists that the king was "captive", "kidnapped" by the liberals, in the same way that he had been by Napoleon during the War of Independence. In fact, the first proclamation of the Regency began by saying that it had been established “to govern Spain during the captivity of S.M.C. Mr. Don Fernando VII. Another of the arguments used was the lack of popular support that, according to the royalists, the constitutional regime had. This is how it appeared in the Manifesto that the lovers of the Monarchy make to the Spanish Nation, to the other powers and to the Sovereigns of the Marquis of Mataflorida that circulated throughout Europe: «The immobile and frightened people did not take part in such betrayal the revolution that he always condemned with silent indignation compressed by force.”

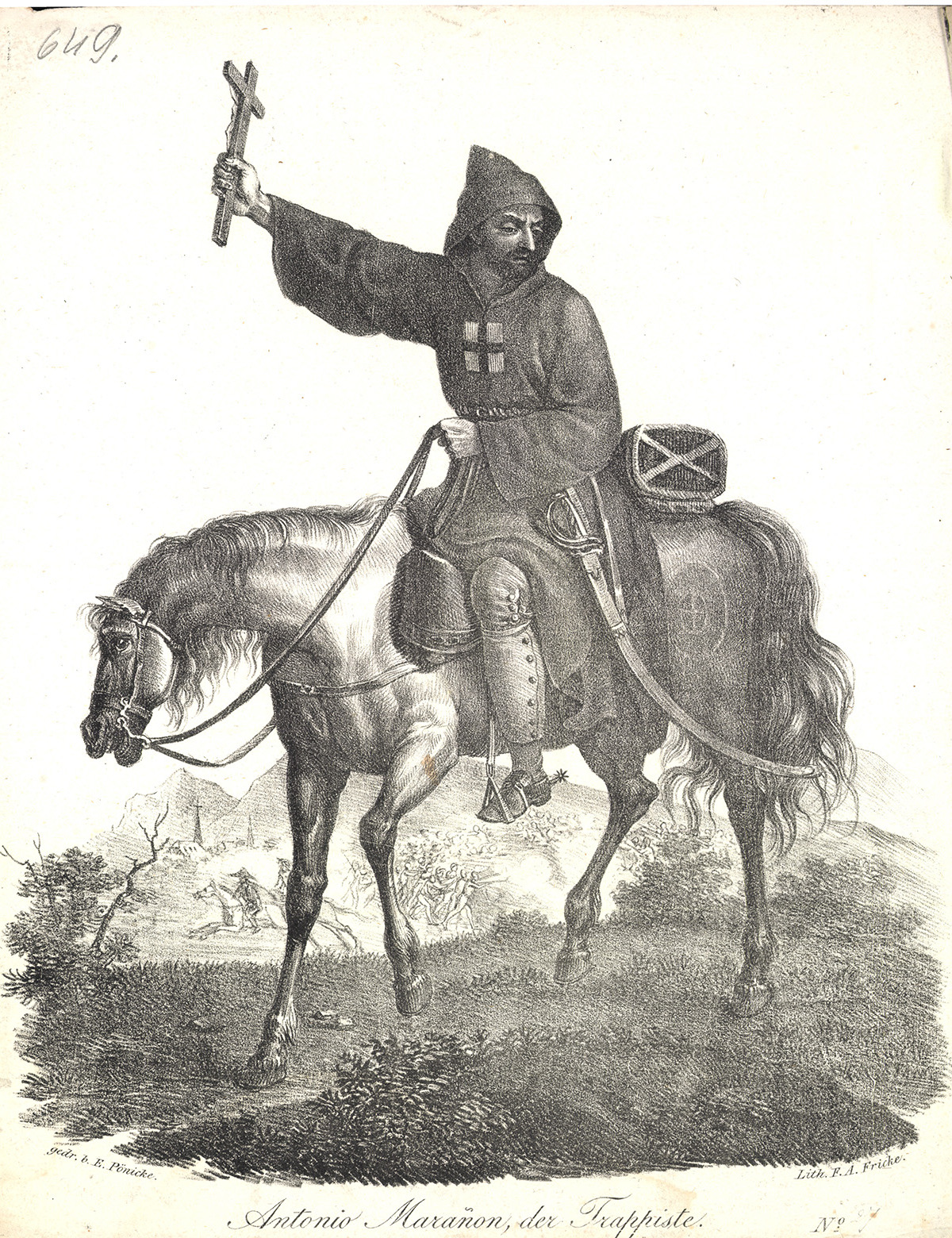
Antonio Marañón, the Trappist, lithograph by Friedrich August Fricke (1784-1858). "The Trappist" was one of the best-known royalist game leaders. According to French Sebastián Miñano his "extravagant" clothing ("He always wears a sackcloth and an identical cape, with a fairly high hood. His head was shaved. A crucifix suspended over his chest; he wears a large rosary as a belt") "has singularly contributed to exalting the people in his favor, because they look at him as a man inspired by God, comparable to those spoken of in the scriptures."

Starting with the constitution of the Regency of Urgel, which "provided the counterrevolution with a centralized direction and a certain ideological coherence," the royalists consolidated their dominance over large areas of the northeast and north of Spain by establishing their own institutions to administer the territory they controlled: Juntas de Cataluña, Navarra, Aragón, Sigüenza and the Basque Country, the latter chaired by General Vicente Quesada and which had a member for each of the three provinces."The royalists consolidated their dominion over the northwest of Catalonia, the Maestrazgo (Aragon and the Valencian Country), half of Navarra and areas of the Basque Country, Galicia, Castilla y León" The Baron de Eroles, hero of the defense of Gerona during the Spanish War of Independence, was appointed Generalissimo of the Royalist Armies in Catalonia and extended the uprising, taking the cities of Balaguer, Puigcerdá, Castellfollit de Riubregós and Mequinenza.

On the other hand, the formation of the Regency was received with enthusiasm by the European courts, although not so much by the French because the Regency had proclaimed the restoration of absolutism as its objective, while France continued to support the establishment in Spain of a regime of Letter Granted, like yours. A representative of the Regency, the count of Spain, attended the Congress of Verona, while the Spanish Government was not invited. For his part, King Ferdinand VII continued to secretly correspond with the European courts to ask them to come to "rescue" him. In a letter sent to the Tsar of Russia in August 1822, the same month in which the Regency of Urgel was established, he told him: «Check the penetration of V.M.Y. the pernicious results that the constitutional system has produced in two years, with the very advantageous ones produced sic by the six years of the regime they call absolute».

Among the factors that would explain the success of the uprisings of the realistas historians have highlighted that the counterrevolutionaries knew how to take advantage of the discontent of the peasantry with the economic policy and fiscal of the liberals. «The peasantry tended to identify liberalism with a very aggressive taxation and with an economic regime harmful to their interests, because it replaced the payment in kind of taxes and seigneurial rights due to their payment in cash, always more burdensome in economies that are poorly integrated into the market and poorly monetized", to which "is added the crisis that Spanish - and European - agriculture was experiencing due to the general fall in prices—a decrease of 50 percent in just ten years—». «That is, a complex social world that nourishes resistance to change», which includes « above the elites of class world». "For everyone, liberalism was the alteration, in some cases more tangible for their economies or their privileges and in general for their mental world and secular patterns of life."

Ramon Arnabat has added the following six factors: "the conspiratorial work of the counterrevolutionary leadership and the economic support that it provided, under French protection"; "the military weakness of the constitutionals, both due to the low number of troops and the incapacity of some of their leaders"; "the agitating and channeling role played by a good part of the clergy"; "the actions of the party leaders who were a key piece of the connection between the counterrevolution and the antirevolution, thanks to the help of sectors of the well-to-do peasants"; «the attitude of the city councils, some committed to the royalists and others indifferent, which allowed the free movement of the parties and made the action of the constitutional ones difficult»; and "the use of guerrillas war and the mobilization of somatén in specific actions that allowed diverse social sectors to be integrated into the counterrevolution."

Ramón Solans, for his part, has highlighted the fundamental role played by the clergy. He quotes the liberal deputy José María Moscoso who in a report he presented to the Cortes wrote: «There has hardly been a party in Spain that did not have in its ranks and at its head unworthy ministers of a religion sweet and tolerant by essence. " He also cites the harangue of a parish priest from Gerona in August 1822 with the purpose of mobilizing the members of the royalist groups that formed «the armies of faith»:

The armies of faith call the faith of Jesus Christ a public cause, and the constitutionalists call the Constitution a public cause. That is why those of faith wear the ribbon of "Dying for Religion" and the others that of "Constitution or Death" and what Catholic Christian will doubt for a moment the party they should embrace? Which of you does not instantly know the true public cause? You have to say it yourself, which one do you want more? faith or freedom. Religion or Atheism. To Christ or to the Constitution.
Everyone shouted long live the faith of Jesus Christ. Long live Religion: Death, death to the Constitution. Immediately he lowered the priest from the pulpit, mounted his horse and all the young men of the town followed him.

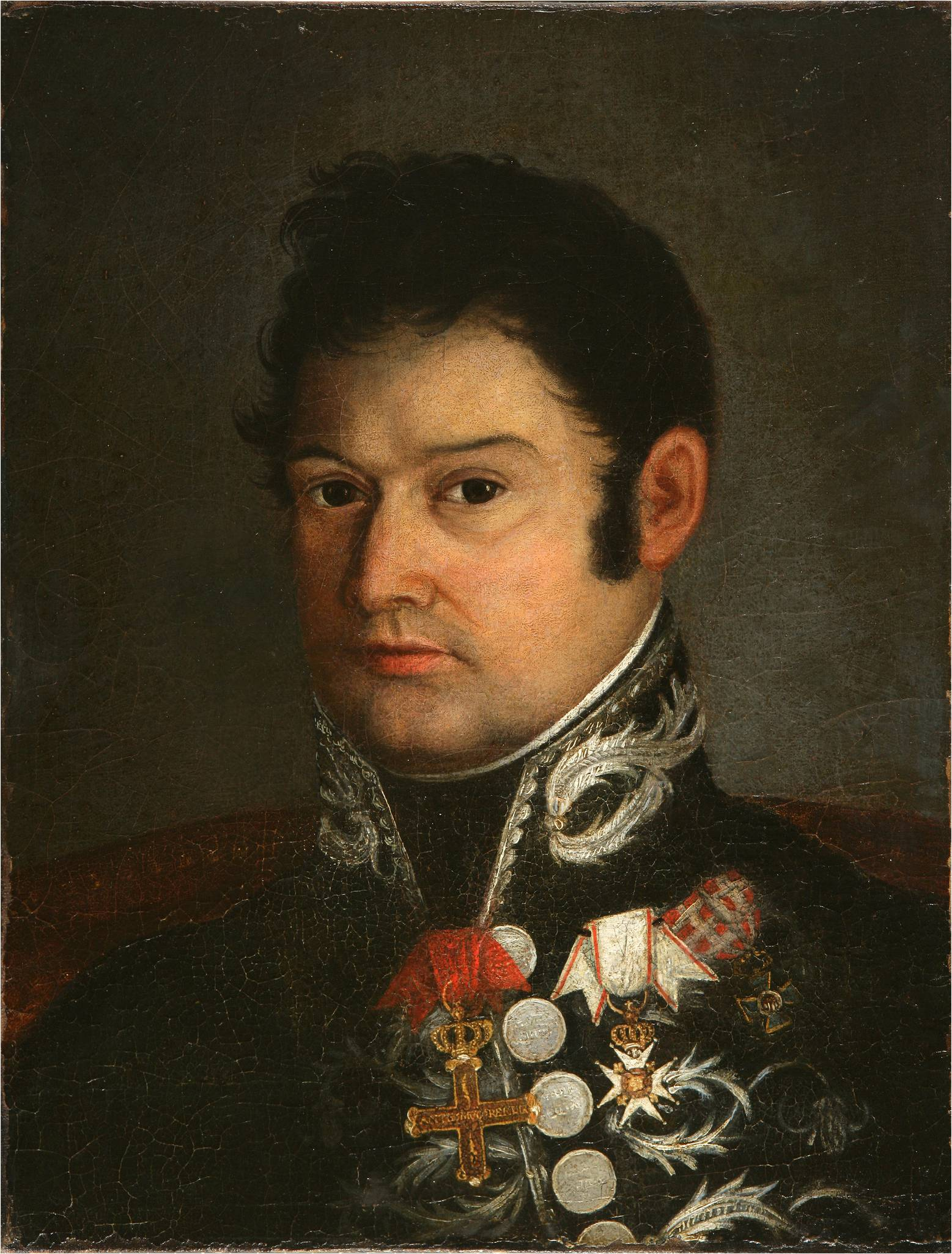
Portrait of the liberal general Francisco Espoz y Mina, who managed to defeat the royalists who were forced to flee to France.

To address the critical situation that was being experienced in the northern half of Spain, extraordinary Cortes were convened and inaugurated on October 7. There a series of decisions were made to stop the royalist offensive. Some convents were suppressed because they were believed to be a nest of absolutists, which was true; Emphatic patriotic statements were made in honor of the Seventh of July, to raise the public spirit — to which the foundation that same month of October of the Landaburian Society also contributed. who took the name of Mamerto Landáburu, one of the first victims of the absolutist uprising of July—; and military measures were adopted to improve the efficiency of the Army. For its part, the government led by Evaristo San Miguel decreed in October 1822 a fifth extraordinary general aimed at recruiting 30,000 soldiers and got the Cortes to authorize him to discretionally replace military leaders whom he considered disaffected to the constitutional cause. He also agreed to the sending reinforcement troops to Catalonia, Navarra and the Basque Country.

The military measures adopted by the Cortes and the Government—which were added to the declaration of the state of war in Catalonia on July 23 (Note: By This Mina obtained broad political powers such as dictating sides, establishing crimes, penalties and relieving any suspected military employee of their duties.) bore fruit and during the autumn and winter of 1822-1823, after a tough campaign that lasted six months, the constitutional armies, one of whose generals was the former guerrilla Espoz y Mina, turned the situation around and forced the royalists of Catalonia, Navarra and the Basque Country to flee to France (about 12,000 men) and those from Galicia, Old Castile, León and Extremadura to flee to Portugal (about 2,000 men). In November the Regency itself had to abandon Seo de Urgel, whose siege by the army of Espoz and Mina had begun in October after taking Cervera the previous month, and cross the border. The fall of the Seo de Urgel meant “a defeat of enormous dimensions". "The same thing happened with the royalist successes in towns like Balaguer, Puigcerdá, Castelfullit or Mequinenza...".

On October 27, 1822, the royalist Navarrese troops, organized into the self-styled Royal Division of Navarra under the command of field marshal Vicente Genaro de Quesada and on October 6 June 1822 had crossed the Pyrenees, they were defeated in the battle of Nazar. Quesada is dismissed by the Regency, which appoints as replacement lieutenant general Carlos O'Donnell y Anhetan, father of Leopoldo O'Donnell, military man and future president of the Council of Ministers during the Reign of Elizabeth II. In January, General Torrijos, in command of the constitutionalist troops, defeated the royalist Navarrese troops and took the fort of Irati on January 12, 1823. After the defeats in Catalonia and Navarra, the royalists respond with the advance of Jorge Bessières towards Madrid and take over Guadalajara, threatening the capital of the kingdom. But from there they were evicted by the army under the command of El Empecinado and they retreated towards the Tagus, pursued by the constitutionalists.

According to Ramon Arnabat, the victory of the constitutionals was due to five factors: «First, for the first time the constitutional army had leaders with prestige and a political-military strategy based on which all available war resources were mobilized in the three aforementioned regions Catalonia, Navarra and the Basque Country. Second, the strategy designed proved to be successful in defeating the royalists since the terrain they dominated was progressively occupied, without allowing the parties to rebuild or reorganize themselves behind the constitutional ranks as had happened until then. Third, the division of the counterrevolutionary leadership between Mataflorida and Eguía made it extremely difficult for the necessary resources to arrive to keep the royalist troops in good condition and for the parties to be properly armed and equipped...; Fourth, the tactics of guerrilla warfare and the autonomy of the leaders of the royalist parties in the definition of their military strategy... were shown to be the main defect when facing the offensive of a better organized and more organized army. numerous that beat them on all fronts. Fifth, the royalists began to lose popular support from the moment they were able to exercise their control over certain areas of the territory, since the inhabitants of those areas were subjected to the demands of the royalist military leaders and extraordinary contributions that contradicted their proclamations. »

After the defeat, it became clear that the only option left was foreign intervention."Despite having capable of mobilizing some 20,000 men, 'all armed, but poorly dressed and generally barely disciplined', they did not represent a real problem for the maintenance of the regime." As Pedro Rújula and Manuel Chust have highlighted, "the failure of the royalist insurrection in the second half of 1822 further reinforced the path of foreign military intervention." The count of Villèle, chief of the French government that had provided considerable support to the royalist parties, will say: "the Spanish royalists, not even if other governments help them, will never be able to carry out the counterrevolution in Spain without the help of a foreign army." With this declaration the first step was taken towards the approval of the invasion of Spain by the One Hundred Thousand Sons of San Luis.

=== Foreign intervention: defeat of the constitutionalists ===
On April 7, 1823, the One Hundred Thousand Sons of San Luis began to cross the Spanish border. There were between 80,000 and 90,000 men—with 22,000 horses and 108 cannons—, which at the end of the campaign would total 120,000, part of which had already participated in the previous French invasion of 1808, with Napoleon). They had the support of Spanish royalist troops that had been organized in France before the invasion—between 12,000 and 35,000 men, according to various sources— to which They were added as the royalist parties that had survived the offensive of the constitutional army advanced. Various historians, such as Juan Francisco Fuentes, have highlighted the paradox that many of the members of the parties and the royalist support troops had fought fifteen years earlier against the French in the War of Independence. A French observer also highlighted the different behavior of the Spanish people in 1808 and 1823 and gave as an example the city of Zaragoza that had faced two sites of the Napoleonic troops in 1808 and in 1809 and that in 1823 had received the French troops with shouts of "Long live Religion and Long live the King»:

The lesson seemed even more striking on April 26, 1823, when our troops entered Zaragoza, beating drums, flags in the wind. The bells and bars of Our Lady of Pilar rang with all their force in honor of those against whom, less than fifteen years before, the Aragonese had held two fierce sieges.

The invaders were very careful not to repeat the same mistakes as in the Napoleonic invasion of 1808—for example, they did not resort to requisitions to supply the troops—and presented themselves as the coming saviors. to restore legitimacy and order, as would be demonstrated by the fact that they had the support of the Spanish royalists. In The proclamation made to the Spaniards before beginning the invasion stated that their intention was to put an end to that "revolutionary faction that has destroyed the royal authority in your country, that has held your king captive, that calls for his deposition, that threatens his life and that of his family, [and that] he has taken his guilty efforts to the other side of your borders. proposed by Ferdinand VII in his requests for help from the European courts." The invaders were accompanied by a self-styled Provisional Board of Spain and the Indies that was established in Oyarzun on April 9. It was presided over by Francisco de Eguía and was made up of Baron de Eroles, who had already been part of the Regency of Urgel, Antonio Gómez Calderón and Juan Bautista Erro.

To face the between 90,000 and 110,000 French invaders supported by about 35,000 Spanish royalists, the Spanish constitutional army only had about 50,000 men. —although some authors have increased the figure to 130,000, but recognizing that they had a different degree of organization and preparation— which placed it in a position of manifest inferiority , and, according to Víctor Sánchez Martín, the government of the liberal exalted Evaristo San Miguel, although he had adopted energetic measures (such as the extraordinary fifth of 30,000 soldiers), "he barely had time to prepare the army for the imminent French invasion." He organized the Spanish forces into four armies, although the only one that really confronted the French troops was the one commanded by General Francisco Espoz y Mina, former guerrilla of the War of Independence, in Catalonia. The consequence was that the French army advanced towards the south with relative ease —on May 13 he entered Madrid— although the speed of the campaign may be deceptive since the French had left behind most of the strongholds without occupy them.

The reason why the Spanish generals, with the exception of Espoz and Mina (and Torrijos and Rafael del Riego, arrested in mid-September and accused of "atrocious crimes"). In 1834, a deputy of the Cortes of the Royal Statute, Pedro Alcalá-Zamora Ruiz de Tienda, attributed it to the "dazzling" produced in them by what the Duke of Angoulême told them that "it was not coming "to destroy freedom or current laws, but to modify them, to level them with those of their country." Another contemporary of the events denounced that they had been bribed by "the gold that the Holy Alliance itself had scattered throughout the nation to mislead and divide minds." «The nation was not guilty...; "She was seduced by gold and overwhelmed by a hundred thousand foreign bayonets sic." In fact the Duke of Angoulême had received instructions to win over the generals, ministers and deputies to Cortes "without saving or care, or promises, or money." The historian Juan Francisco Fuentes points out another factor: the demoralization that caused the defeatism that they demonstrated the liberal government and the Cortes by deciding to abandon Madrid even before the invasion began to settle first in Seville and finally in Cádiz.

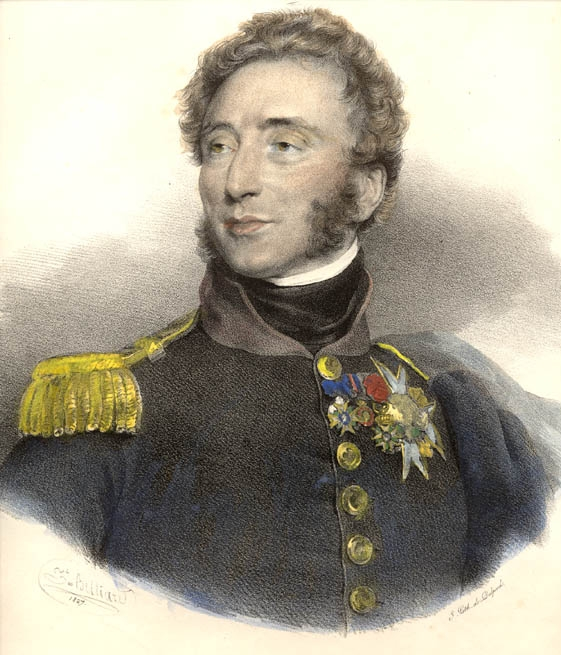
The Duke of Angoulême, commander-in-chief of the Hundred Thousand Sons of Saint Louis.

With the exception of several cities, some of which fought with heroism (such as Pamplona, which resisted the siege until September, or like Barcelona or Cartagena which continued fighting until November, when the constitutional regime it had been demolished more than a month ago), there was no popular resistance to the invasion, nor were anti-French guerrillas formed as during the War of Independence (rather the opposite happened: the royalist parties joined the French army). This was confirmed by the marquis from Someruelos in 1934: «One hundred thousand French people came, it's true; but this armed force, neither that of two hundred nor four hundred thousand French, would not have subjugated the nation if it had not wanted to." According to Josep Fontana, the fundamental reason for "the passivity of a large part of the Spanish population, and especially of the peasants", was the agrarian policy of the Triennium that did not satisfy the aspirations of the latter - the vast majority of the population - "which amounted to the suppression of feudal burdens, including tithe, and in the possibility of access by cultivators to ecclesiastical amortized property».

Also playing a relevant role, according to Fontana, was the fiscal policy that "fell very hard on the peasants, by demanding new taxes in cash, at a time when, with the drop in prices, it was much more difficult for them to obtain money". Some liberals already warned - many towns "cannot pay in money, but can pay in grains" - but those who knew how to take advantage of the rural discontent caused by cash taxes were the royalists. In a proclamation of August 1821 addressed to the farmers of Zaragoza, it was denounced that they "work themselves to death and then sell their fruits for extremely low prices at four abaros sic The Duke of Angoulême himself communicated this to Count de Villèle: «The king has the clergy and the common people on his side. Everything that is a lord, owner or bourgeois is against him, or distrusts him, with very few exceptions."

Ángel Bahamonde and Jesús Antonio Martínez point out another factor: that when the liberals called for resistance as in 1808, they did not understand that the situation that was being experienced in 1823 was very different. «In 1823 the liberals did not understand that the emotional nationalism of 1808 was not necessarily still built on a consistent liberal political project, that is, 1808 had been a more anti-French than liberal response, which would help to understand the apparent paradox: the invader was the same, but that of 1808 was the son of the revolution and of 1823 of legitimism. [...] In this way the liberals miscalculated their social supports and, in general, the response was indifference».

On May 23, the Duke of Angoulême entered Madrid he appointed a Regency made up of the duke of Infantado, the duke of Montemart, the Juan Cavia González|bishop of Osma, the baron of Eroles and Antonio Gómez—these last two had already been part of the Provisional Junta of Oyárzun—. Angoulême justified it by saying: "The time has come to establish in a solemn and stable manner the regency that must be in charge of administering the country, organizing the army, and agreeing with me on the means of carrying out the great work of liberating to your king." On June 9, the French troops crossed Despeñaperros, defeating the forces of General Plasencia who confronted them, thus clearing the way to Seville, where at that time the Government, the Cortes, the king and the royal family were located, and it was immediately decided to transfer to Cádiz where they arrived on June 15.

As the French troops advanced southwards, the Spanish royalists unleashed "a general explosion of violence" that "covered the country with revenge and abuses, carried out without subjecting themselves to any authority or following any rule" and whose victims were the liberals. The Duke of Angoulême felt obliged to intervene and on August 8, 1823 he promulgated the Andújar Ordinance which stripped the royalist authorities of the power to carry out carried out persecutions and arrests for political reasons, a power that was reserved to the French military authorities. The royalist rejection was immediate, triggering "an insurrection by absolutist Spain against the French" which was successful since on August 26 the Duke of Angoulême rectified (officially "clarified" the decree), pressured by the French Government concerned about the crisis that was being experienced and the opposition to the Holy Alliance Ordinance. The scope of application of the Ordinance was restricted to the officers and troops included in the military capitulations, with which it was repealed de facto. One of the consequences of the campaign that was unleashed against the Andújar Ordinance was the reinforcement of extremist or ultra realism that came to form secret societies, among which the «Apostolic Board». After the reversal of the Ordinance, the “multiple and bloody explosion of absolutist violence” continued to the point of that the historian Josep Fontana has described it as «white terror».

On June 18, French troops had entered Seville and shortly after began the siege of Cádiz, as had happened thirteen years before. On the night of August 30 to 31, the French troops took the fort of Trocadero and twenty days later that of Sancti Petri, with which the resistance was made impossible. Cádiz this time had not had help by sea as in 1810. On September 24, General Armand Charles Guilleminot, chief of the General Staff of the French Army, issued an ultimatum to the besieged to capitulate, threatening them that if the royal family were the victim of any Unfortunately, "the deputies to the Cortes, the ministers, the state councillors, the generals and all the government employees caught in Cádiz will be put to the sword." The bombing of the city then resumed.

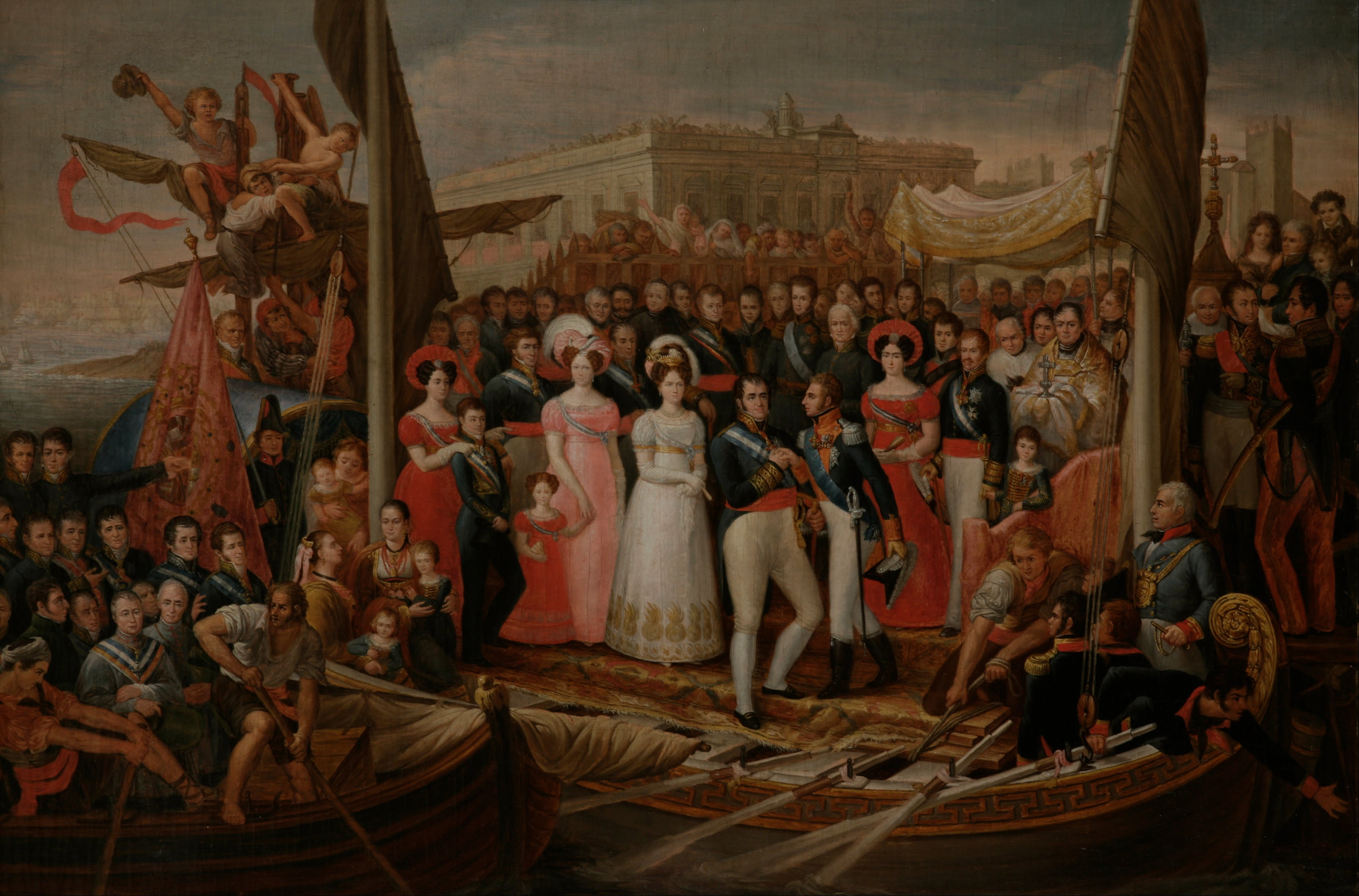
The Landing of Ferdinand VII in El Puerto de Santa María by José Aparicio. It represents the landing of Ferdinand VII in the Puerto de Santa María after having been "liberated" from his "captivity" in Cádiz. He is received by the Duke of Angoulême, commander of the One Hundred Thousand Sons of San Luis who have invaded Spain to "rescue" him, and by the Duke of Infantado, president of the absolutist Regency appointed by the French.

On September 30, 1823, after four months of siege, the liberal government had to let go of King Ferdinand VII, who met with the Duke of Angoulême—and with the Duke of Infantado, president of the royalist Regency—on October 1. in the Puerto de Santa María, on the other side of the Bay of Cádiz that the king had crossed aboard a decorated felucca. A good part of the liberals who were in Cádiz fled to England via Gibraltar, thinking that the king would not fulfill his promise, made before being "liberated", to "bring and cause to be carried out a general, complete and absolute forgetting of everything past, without exception sic whatsoever." They were not wrong.

As soon as Ferdinand VII was free, he retracted the promise he had made (already on September 27 he had written to the Duke of Angoulême: "I have promised a general forgetfulness in regards sic to opinions, not in regards sic to facts." ») and as soon as he disembarked in the Port of Santa María, he promulgated another decree in which he repealed all the legislation of the Triennium (which also failed to fulfill the promise he had made to the king of France and the tsar of Russia that he was not going to « return to reign under the regime they call absolute»).

As soon as he was free, he said: «The most criminal betrayal, the most shameful cowardice, the most horrendous contempt for my Royal Person, and the most inevitable violence, were the elements used to essentially vary the paternal Government of my kingdoms in a democratic code». Upon arriving in Seville, Fernando VII wrote a letter to the king of Naples Fernando I that He had lived a revolutionary experience similar to his own, although much briefer, and had also regained power thanks to outside intervention.

== Anticlerical and clerical violence during the war ==
Unlike the Cortes of Cádiz, the Cortes of the Triennium addressed the ecclesiastical confiscation, in relation to the assets of the regular clergy. Thus the decree of October 1, 1820 suppressed “all the monasteries of the monastic orders; the canons regular of Saint Benedict, of the cloistered congregation of Tarragona and Cesaraugusta; those of Saint Augustine and the Premonstratensians; the convents and schools of the military orders of Santiago, Calatrava, Montesa and Alcántara; those of the Order of Saint John of Jerusalem, those of the Saint John of God and the Betlemites, and all the other hospitals of any kind. Their movable and immovable assets were "applied to public credit" and were therefore declared "national assets" subject to immediate confiscation.

During the civil war of 1822-1823, increasingly rampant anticlerical and clerical violent events occurred. As pointed out Modesto Lafuente: «the civil war was meanwhile raging in the peninsula, mainly devastating the provinces of Catalonia, Aragon, Navarra and Vizcaya, and on a lesser scale those of Castilla, Galicia, Valencia and Extremadura, also reaching the Andalusias».

Where the anticlerical violence of the liberal side reached greatest virulence was in Catalonia. There their first victims were two Capuchins who lost their lives on May 22 during the absolutist insurrection of Cervera and in total there were eighty ecclesiastics killed, fifty-four in the diocese of Barcelona (some of these Some deaths occurred in combat or after a trial, but others were pure murders, sometimes accompanied by torture). The most terrible event occurred on November 17, 1822 on the outskirts of Manresa where twenty-four men branded as absolutists were murdered, among them fourteen clerics and a lay friar. "The proclamation of the Urgell regency was burned in Barcelona, those disaffected by the regime were arrested, mostly friars, and in this dialectic of civil war, the city was the scene of assaults on the Capuchin convents, Dominicans, Franciscans and Augustinians with a toll of more than fifty dead, and also deportations of friars, a measure that was repeated in Valencia and Orihuela. It was the collective response of revenge against the religious orders considered insurrectionary. There was also the institutional response through the army, led by Mina, with decisions of unusual violence, such as that of Castellfullit. In this course of violence, the spiral became increasingly ferocious and cases occurred such as the assault and death of bishop of Vich who died in the citadel of Barcelona, where he had been transferred as a prisoner after being detained in his episcopal residence, or he was shot when he was being taken to Tarragona, according to other versions, due to the proximity of the One Hundred Thousand Sons of San Luis, or the shooting of twenty-five friars in Manresa fifteen, according to Fontana or the devastation of the Poblet monastery, not at the hands of the liberal soldiers, but of the peasants of the neighboring towns who cut down forests and desecrated graves for the "cry of the flattering voices of freedom and equality", according to the abbot himself, although their lands had already been sold to individuals, or perhaps precisely for this reason."

Among the clerics who led the royalist parties were cura Merino and the Trappist and new leaders "such as Gorostidi, Eceiza or Salazar, emulators of the previous ones in cruelty and in raising the cross to commit all kinds of misdeeds. The action became famous because the friar led the assault, standing on the ladder, with the crucifix in his hand, and personally and viciously killed the prisoners. (...) The Trappist blessed the people who knelt before him, he feigned revelations, he rode with his habit rolled up to "blunt enemy bullets and make him invulnerable." The first occasion on which he showed his ferocity was when he confronted the constitutional army in Cervera, he set fire to the town from two opposite angles, littered the streets with corpses and thus avenged the Capuchins who had The soldiers were killed in response to the shots fired from the convent. Comerford, from "some gruesome romantic novel", according to Caro Baroja.

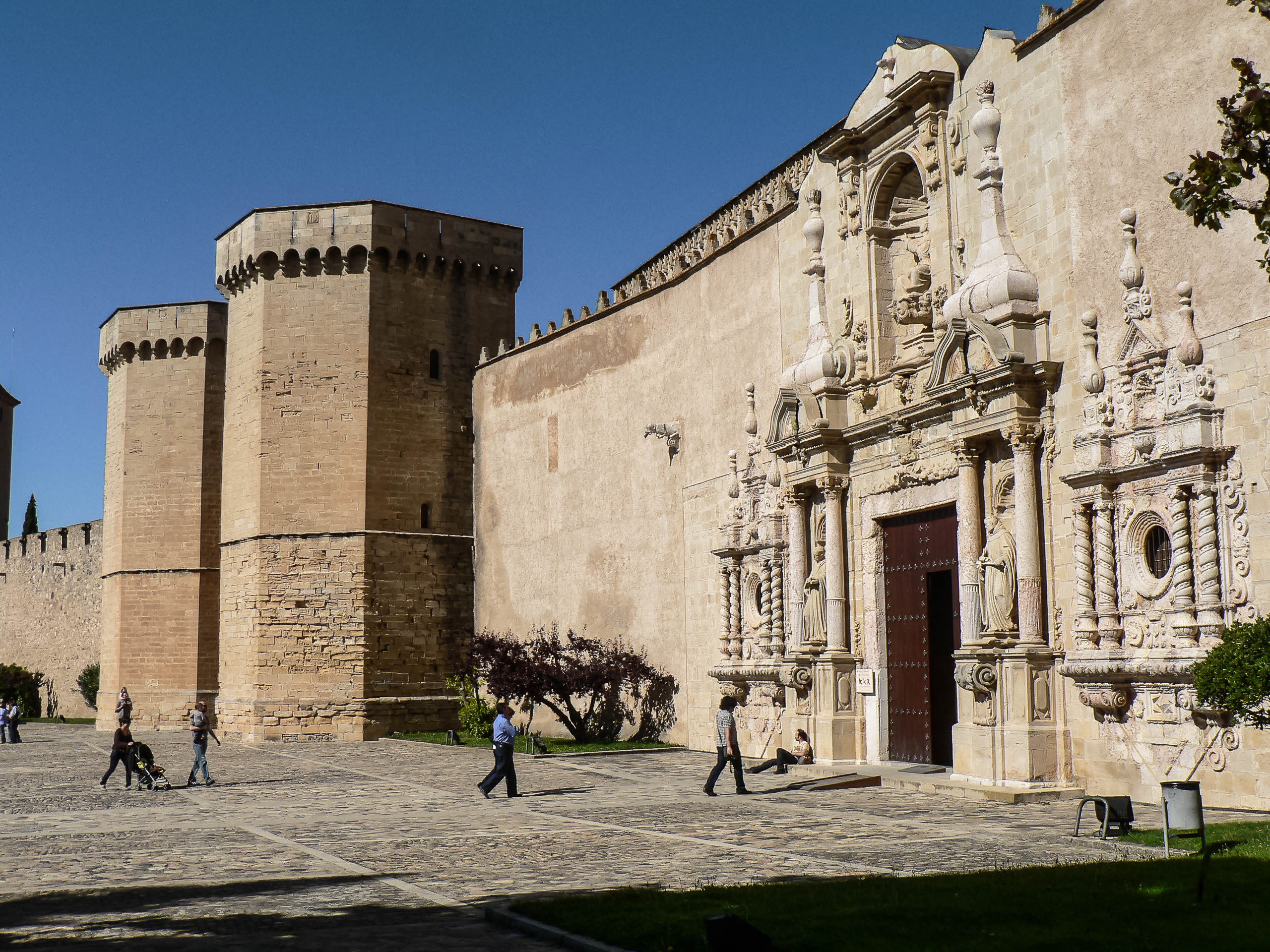
Facade of the Abbey Church (and to its right the Royal Gate) of the Poblet Abbey. It was attacked and devastated by peasants from neighboring towns who cut down forests and desecrated graves due to the "cry of the flattering voices of freedom and equality", according to the abbot himself.

The royalist side assaulted temples and attacked clerics from the opposing side. For example, in January 1823 a royalist party entered Burgo de Osma and looted the houses of a lectoral, an abbot and a local canon. Likewise, the guerrilla priest Gorostidi did not hesitate to set fire to two churches in Dicastillo and Durango to arrest two constitutional priests. In general, they committed all kinds of outrages against the liberals in the occupied towns, a violence encouraged by the absolutist clergy as manifested in their writings, such as that of the canon of Malaga, Juan de la Buelga y Solís, who wrote as soon as the Triennium ended: "I will never make peace" with anyone who is not an absolute royalist and Catholic, apostolic and Roman. From the absolutist violence, we do not know the total number of liberals who were murdered by the royalists, "after the corresponding torment and bloodthirsty cruelty."

Unlike what happens with the absolutist side, regarding the liberal side we do have several lists of the murdered ecclesiastics that give a figure close to one hundred. These reports also explain that many clerics were murdered after being stripped naked and that some were cruelly tortured or subjected to all kinds of humiliation before dying. «One of the militiamen participating in the death of the Franciscan Luis Pujol dipped a slice of bread in his still hot blood; They carved tobacco on the crown of the vicar of Vilafortuny, then stabbed him and, still alive, threw him into a well; The priest of Santa Inés had his eyes gouged out, his fingers were twisted until they were torn off, and his crown was slashed." In the attacks on temples and monasteries - such as those of Poblet, Santes Creus or Montserrat - sacrilegious acts were carried out, although sporadically, such as stealing the ciborium with the hosts, stabbing the images or unearthing the corpses of some religious "playing and doing a thousand indecent things with them", according to a witness.

== See also ==
- Carlism
- Hundred Thousand Sons of Saint Louis
- Trienio Liberal

== Notes, citations and sources ==
=== Sources ===
- Frasquet, Ivana; Rújula, Pedro, eds. (2020). El Trienio Liberal (1820-1823). Una mirada política [The Liberal Triennium (1820-1823). A political view] (in Spanish). Granada: Comares. ISBN 978-84-9045-976-8.
  - Arnabat, Ramon. "La Contrarrevolución y la antirrevolución". In Frasquet & Rújula (2020), pp. 285ff.
  - Butrón Prida, Gonzalo. "Los Cien Mil Hijos de San Luis". In Frasquet & Rújula (2020), pp. 555ff.
  - Orobon, Marie-Angèle; Fuentes, Juan Francisco. "La Calle". In Frasquet & Rújula (2020), pp. 379ff.
  - Ramón Solans, Francisco Javier. "Religión". In Frasquet & Rújula (2020), pp. 355ff.
  - Rújula, Pedro. "El Rey". In Frasquet & Rújula (2020), pp. 3ff.
  - Sánchez Martín, Victor. "El Ejercito". In Frasquet & Rújula (2020), pp. 131ff.
  - Simal, Juan Luis. "El Exilio". In Frasquet & Rújula (2020), pp. 571ff.
- Bahamonde, Angel; Martínez, Jesús (2011) [1994]. Historia de España: siglo XIX. Madrid: Cátedra. ISBN 978-84-376-1049-8.
- Caro Baroja (2008). Historia del anticlericalismo español. Madrid: Caro Raggio. ISBN 978-84-7035-188-4.
- Fontana, Josep (1979). La crisis del Antiguo Régimen, 1808-1833. ISBN 84-7423-084-5.
- Fontana, Josep (2013) [2006]. De en medio del tiempo. La segunda restauración española, 1823-1834. Barcelona: Crítica. ISBN 978-84-8432-792-9.
- Fuentes, Juan Francisco (2007). El fin del Antiguo Régimen (1808-1868). Política y sociedad. Madrid: Síntesis. ISBN 978-84-975651-5-8.
- Rafael Gambra Ciudad. Guerra Realista. Fondo de Publicaciones del Gobierno de Navarra. ISBN 84-235-0637-1.
- Rafael Gambra Ciudad (September 2006). La primera guerra civil de España (1821-1823): historia y meditación de una lucha olvidada. Nueva Hispanidad, Ediciones. ISBN 9789871036400.
- Gil Novales, Alberto (2020). El Trienio Liberal. Zaragoza: Prensas de la Universidad de Zaragoza. ISBN 978-84-1340-071-6.
- La Parra López, Emilio (1998). El anticlericalismo español contemporáneo. Madrid: Biblioteca Nueva. ISBN 84-7030-532-8.
- La Parra López, Emilio (2018). Fernando VII. Un rey deseado y detestado. Barcelona: Tusquets. ISBN 978-84-9066-512-1.
- Pérez Garzón, Juan Sisinio (1997). El anticlericalismo. Madrid: Marcial Pons (Rev. Ayer, n.º 27). ISBN 84-7248-505-6.
- Rújula, Pedro (2023). Religión, Rey y Patria. Los orígenes contrarrevolucionarios de la España contemporánea, 1793-1840. Madrid: Marcial Pons. ISBN 978-84-18752-76-6.
- Rújula, Pedro; Chust, Manuel (2020). El Trienio Liberal en la monarquía hispánica. Revolución e independencia (1820-1823). Madrid: Los Libros de la Catarata. ISBN 978-84-9097-937-2.
- Tomás y Valiente, Francisco (1972) [1971]. El marco político de la desamortización en España (2nd ed.). Barcelona: Ariel.
