= Battle of Cervera (1811) =

1811 battle during the Peninsular War

- Part of Peninsular War
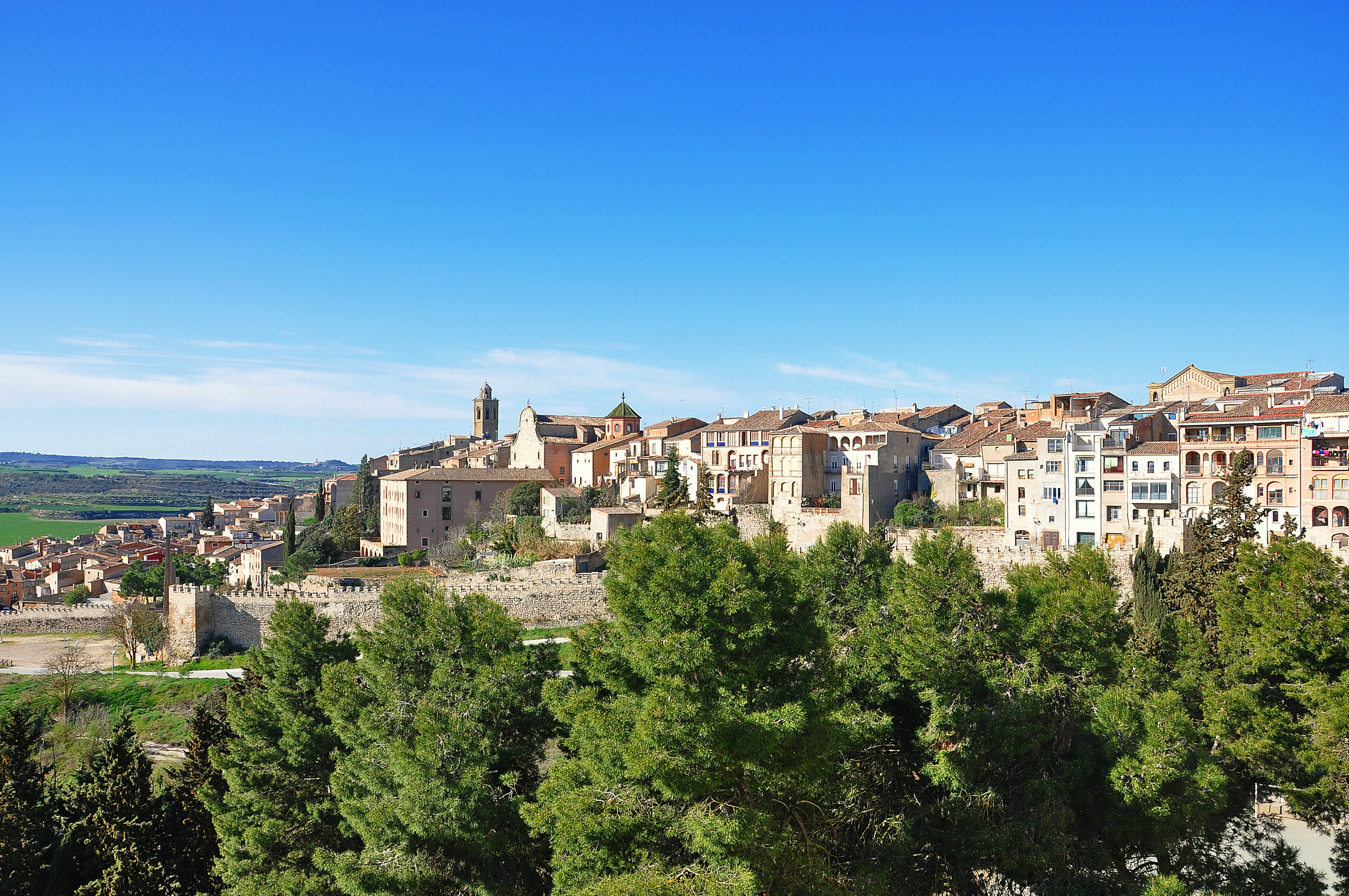
- Cervera
Date	4–14 October 1811
Location	Cervera, Catalonia, Spain 41°40′N 1°16′E
Result	Spanish victory

Belligerents
(France) First French Empire	Kingdom of Spain

Commanders and leaders
(France) Jacques MacDonald	(Spain) Luis Roberto de Lacy

Units involved
(France) VII Corps	(Spain) Army of Catalonia

Strength
1,000	8,000

Casualties and losses
995	Unknown

Peninsular War: Aragón Catalonia
current battle

In the Battle of Cervera (4 to 14 October 1811) a Spanish force led by Luis Roberto de Lacy attacked a series of Imperial French garrisons belonging to the VII Corps of Marshal Jacques MacDonald. The actions were highly successful and netted nearly 1,000 enemy prisoners. The clashes occurred during the Peninsular War, part of the Napoleonic Wars. The largest garrison was located at Cervera which is located about 55 kilometres (34 mi) east of Lleida, in Catalonia, Spain.

== Background ==
After the Army of Catalonia was nearly destroyed in the sieges of Tarragona and Figueres during July and August 1811, Lacy replaced Luis González Torres de Navarra, Marquess of Campoverde as Captain General. Marshal Louis Gabriel Suchet struck another blow against the Catalans when his troops seized the miquelet base in the Battle of Montserrat on 25 July 1811. The unpopular but vigorous Lacy quickly reorganized the 8,000-man remnant of his army into three small divisions under Generals Baron de Eroles, Pedro Sarsfield, and Francisco Milans del Bosch. With the Royal Navy's assistance, Lacy seized the Medes Islands at the mouth of the Ter River on 12 September.

== Battle ==
On 4 October 1811, Lacy's forces captured 200 Imperial troops at Igualada on the highway between Barcelona and Lleida. Continuing west, the Spanish column seized a French convoy near Cervera on the 7th. Lacy overwhelmed the garrison of Cervera on 11 October, bagging another 645 prisoners. Finally, on the 14th the Spaniards took 150 more captives at Bellpuig. After these defeats, the French evacuated the monastery of Santa Maria de Montserrat on Montserrat Mountain.
