= Battle of Montserrat =

1811 Peninsular War battle

- Part of Peninsular War
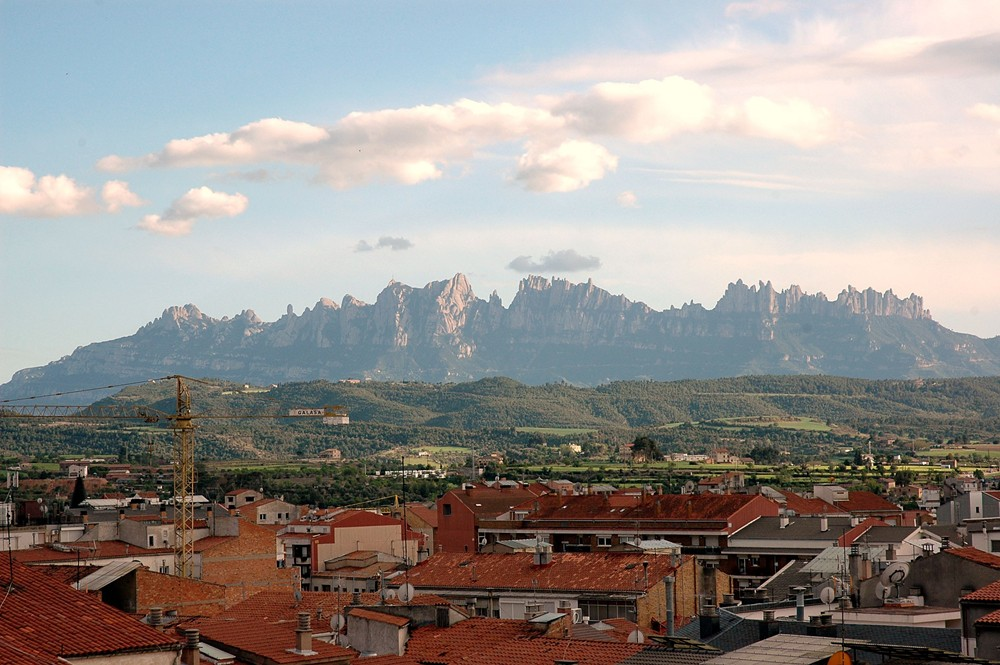
- Montserrat as seen from Manresa
Date	25 July 1811
Location	Montserrat, Catalonia, Spain 41°35′34″N 1°50′12″E
Result	French victory

Belligerents
(France) First French Empire	Kingdom of Spain

Commanders and leaders
(France) Marshal Suchet	(Spain) Baron de Eroles

Units involved
(France) Army of Aragon	(Spain) Army of Catalonia

Strength
10,000+	1,500, 10 guns

Casualties and losses
200	400, 10 guns

Peninsular War: Aragón Catalonia
current battle

In the Battle of Montserrat (29 July 1811) a force of Spanish irregulars led by Joaquín Ibáñez, Baron de Eroles defended Montserrat Mountain against two Imperial French divisions under the command of Marshal Louis Gabriel Suchet. The minor action occurred during the Peninsular War, part of the Napoleonic Wars. The battle was fought near the Santa Maria de Montserrat Monastery, which is located on the mountain 36 kilometres (22 mi) northwest of Barcelona, Catalonia, Spain.

Suchet's successful Siege of Tarragona wiped out the bulk of the Spanish regular forces in northeast Spain. After the siege, the newly promoted marshal took the divisions of Louis François Félix Musnier and Bernard-Georges-François Frère to clear the Catalan militia or miquelets away from the Lleida–Barcelona road. Overlooking the road, the guerrilla base of Montserrat had defied the French after three years of war. Suchet sent the soldiers of Louis Jean Nicolas Abbé's brigade scrambling up one mountain track while his remaining troops watched other possible escape routes. The French overran the guerrilla base and seized its artillery but most of the Spanish irregulars evaded capture. Suchet installed an Italian garrison on the mountain, but after the capture of Cervera in mid-October by Luis Roberto de Lacy's Spanish forces, the Imperial troops were withdrawn.

== Background ==
On 15 July 1811, Marshal Suchet reported 43,783 troops present for duty in the Army of Aragon. Including the men sick or on detached service, the total was 51,088. Commanding the five infantry divisions, one infantry brigade, and one cavalry brigade were Generals of Division Musnier, Frère, Jean Isidore Harispe, Pierre-Joseph Habert, Luigi Gaspare Peyri, Claude Antoine Compère, and General of Brigade André Joseph Boussart.
