= Dmitry Buturlin =

Russian general and historian

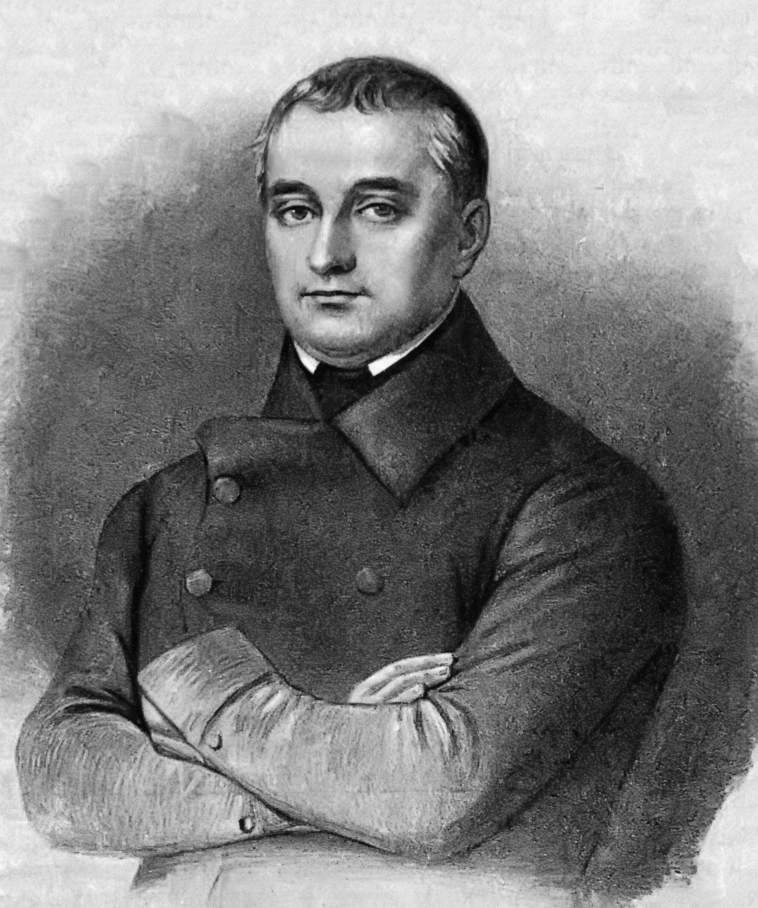
- Dmitry Buturlin (date unknown)
- Born: 11 May 1790
- Died: 21 October 1849 (aged 59)
- Military career
- Allegiance: Russian Empire
- Branch: Imperial Russian Army
- Service years: c. 1800s-1829, 1848
- Rank: Major General
- Conflicts: Napoleonic Wars; Royalist War; Battle of Trocadero; Russo-Turkish War (1828-1829); Hungarian Revolt of 1848
- Other work: Director of the Imperial Public Library

Dmitry Petrovich Buturlin (Russian: Дмитрий Петрович Бутурлин; 11 May 1790 – 21 October 1849) was a Russian general and military historian from an old noble family of Ratshid stock. He was admitted into the Governing Senate in May 1833 and into the State Council of Imperial Russia in December 1840.

== Biography ==
He took part in many campaigns of the Napoleonic Wars as aide-de-camp to Prince Pyotr Mikhailovich Volkonsky and Alexander I of Russia. In 1823 he went to France to help suppress the Spanish Revolution of 1820 and distinguished himself in the Battle of Trocadero. He retired after the Russo-Turkish War (1828–1829) with the rank of Major General, but was recalled to active service on the occasion of the Hungarian Revolt of 1848.

After giving up his military career, Buturlin was appointed Director of the Imperial Public Library in 1843. Buturlin's obscurantist views led him to demand from Czar Nicholas I of Russia an all-pervasive system of censorship. During the last year of his life he headed the Buturlin Committee, a secret super-censorship organ that supervised all regular censors. The Committee was disbanded early in the reign of Alexander II of Russia.

As a historian Buturlin described in detail the major wars of Catherine II's reign and the Patriotic War of 1812. Many of his works are in French. He viewed Alexander I as the true saviour of Russia and ranked the Battle of Borodino among Kutuzov's mistakes.
