= Combat of Villaseca =

1812 combat during the Peninsular War

- Part of Peninsular War
Date	18 January 1812
Location	Vila-seca, Tarragona, Catalonia
Result	Spanish victory

Belligerents
French Empire	Spain

Commanders and leaders
Lafosse	Baron de Eroles

Strength
Over 800 infantry and dragoons	Over 3,000 somatenes

Casualties and losses
Over 200 dead; almost 600 captured	Unknown

The combat of Villaseca was a Spanish victory during the Peninsular War, when an irregular Spanish force of over 3,000 somatenes, led by Baron de Eroles, ambushed a column of French troops in the village of Vila-seca, Tarragona, on 18 January 1812.

General Lafosse, the governor of Tortosa, was on his way to relieve Tarragona with an infantry battalion and a troop of dragoons, when he was surprised by Eroles, at the head of over 3,000 somatenes, at Villaseca. Although Lafosse himself managed to reach Tarragona, with only twenty-two of his dragoons, the rest of his troops, after resisting for several hours in the village, was forced to surrender. Eroles took nearly 600 prisoners, and left over 200 French troops dead. The following day, Lafosse returned to the village with as many men from the Tarragona garrison as could be spared, but was too late to reverse his defeat.

British Commodore Edward Codrington, then commanding a Royal Navy squadron in the Mediterranean Sea charged with harrying French shipping, was present at the combat, having come on shore to confer with Eroles, with whom he often collaborated, regarding an action against Tarragona. Eroles's men also managed to free two Royal Navy captains who had been taken prisoner the previous day by Lafosse's men after having landed at Cape Salou.
