= Joaquín Ibáñez, 3rd Baron de Eroles =

Spanish nobleman and soldier

Joaquín Ibáñez Cuevas y de Valonga, 3rd Baron de Eroles
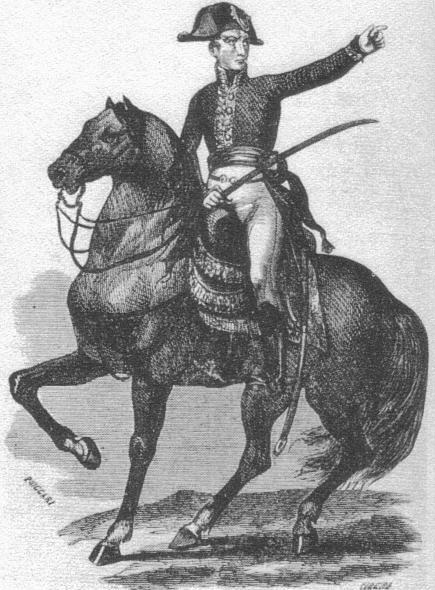
- Baron de Eroles from Guerrilleros de 1808 (Madrid, 1887)
- Born: 6 January 1785; Talarn, Catalonia, Spain
- Died: 25 August 1825 (aged 40) Daimiel, Castile-La Mancha, Spain
- Branch: Infantry
- Rank: Captain general of the Army
- Conflicts: Peninsular War; Battle of Molins de Rey; Siege of Gerona; Raid of La Junquera; Battle of Montserrat; Battle of Col de Balaguer; Battle of Altafulla; Battle of Roda de Isábena
- Awards: Order of Charles III, Knight; Laureate Cross of Saint Ferdinand; Order of Saint Louis; Légion d'Honneur
- Other work: Barcelona Fine Arts Academy; Lawyer

Joaquín Ibáñez Cuevas y de Valonga, 3rd Baron de Eroles and Marquis of Cañada Ibáñez (Kingdom of the Two Sicilies) (6 January 1785 – 25 August 1825) was a Spanish nobleman and soldier, active in Catalonia during the Peninsular War. Shortly before his death, he was promoted to Captain general of the Army, Spain's highest military rank.

== Early life ==
Born into a noble family, he enrolled as a cadet at the Real Colegio de Artillería, in Segovia, though he did not graduate as an officer.

He later studied law at University of Cervera and after graduating, set up his own law firm.

== Peninsular War (1807–1814) ==
Eroles was present at the defeat at Molíns de Rey (21 December 1808), and by the end of that year he had raised, armed and financed his own unit of 1,600 volunteers, the 2nd Tercio of Talarn Volunteers.

=== 1809 ===
With his tercio he fought skirmishes at Igualada (11 January 1809), putting General Chabran's troops to flight, and at Maizneja (17 January 1809) where, with 300 men, he spearheaded the attack on the enemy. This latter incident led to the Captain General of Catalonia, General Reding, promoting him to lieutenant colonel and giving him the command of the tercio.

That same year, he was active at several armed conflicts; at Capellades (17 February); at Igualada (9 March) and at which his battalion was surrounded by a force twice the size, plus 200 cavalry troops, and from which his unit was able to escape at bayonet-point; Castel Bisbal (19 March); Tarrasa (2 April); Coll de Soras (13–16 April). He then fought at San Hipólito, at Serratosa (23 May), at Uxay (24 June); captured a French convoy at La Junquera (10 July). On 1 September he was able to breach the siege of Gerona at the head of a convoy. For this latter achievement he was promoted to Colonel. Strongly opposed to the terms of capitulation, he was taken prisoner at the end of the siege but managed to escape while being taken to Perpignan.

=== 1810 ===
On returning to Spain, by the end of two months he had recruited 1,500 troops and he was appointed Colonel-in-chief of the 2nd Platoon of the Catalonia Light Infantry, based at Montserrat. Shortly thereafter he was promoted to brigadier (May 1810).

He led the Spanish forces at Viladecans (19 August 1810), and at Castellolid he stopped Marshal MacDonald’s advancing forces, thereby allowing the Captain general of Catalonia, O’Donnell, to take La Bisbal (September 1810), San Feliú de Guixols and Palamós.

Appointed General-in-chief of the Ampurdán, he directed the action at La Junquera (19 October) where, despite being wounded by a bayonet, he went on to kill the seven enemy combatants that had surrounded him. At La Junquera, he captured a convoy and took 174 prisoners. (According to the Gazeta de Valencia, 6 noviembre 1810, he took 75 prisoners, including two officers, leaving more than 255 dead on the battlefield, including five officers.) Two days later, and despite his still-open wound, he led the action at Lladó (21 October), where he defeated an enemy force four times greater than his own. At La Plana (5 & 8 December), he defeated Clément’s division and pursued it from Olot to Bañolas.

=== 1811 ===
At the beginning of 1811 he was given the command of the Llobregat Line, and took part in several skirmishes on the plains of Barcelona. On 16 April, in the mountains of Puigventós, accompanied by the Alcántara Cavalry Regiment, they defeated an entire battalion, excepting five officers and 30 soldiers that were taken prisoners.

On 19 May, when together with the flankers of the Numancia Regiment and 80 horse of the Alcántara Regiment, they were able to cover the retreat of the troops that had been repelled in their assault on Montjuic, by defeating the French column that had attempted to cut off said retreat.

He fought at Manresa (31 May) where, at the head of a regiment and three battalions, he beat and pursued MacDonald's troops until almost reaching Sabadell, leading to the loss of some two thousand French troops. Shortly thereafter, he devised a plan to recover the fortress at San Fernando de Figueras: he was able to distract the French division based in the Ampurdán by taking the fortresses of Castellfullit and Olot, taking over five hundred prisoners and then, on 16 June, penetrated the enemy lines at bayonet point and managed to enter the castle with a large convoy. For that action, he was promoted to field marshal. He stayed at the castle throughout the siege, participating in several sorties, including on 3 May, when his troops penetrated the French line and attacked the town of Figueras, holding the square for several hours after the Spanish Army had been defeated and had retreated. With only two hundred horse from the castle garrison, he was able to liberate 1,600 prisoners. On another sortie, two days later, he again penetrated the lines of the French siegers and was able to gather abundant firewood and several head of cattle. On a sortie on 7 May, he was able to capture a French convoy on its way from Figueras to La Junquera and finally, in the night of 16 May, his three hundred infantrymen were able to safeguard the departure of the garrison's cavalry by breaching the enemy lines four times at bayonet point, without the loss of a single Spanish soldier but capturing around twenty French soldiers. As a result of that last action, a French division of six thousand men was sent out throughout the Ampurdán to capture him and his troops, without success.

On 11 June he beat Marshal Suchet’s cavalry near Tarragona, and on the 18th he captured a convoy of 500 mules in Falset. When Tarragona finally fell to the French, Eroles's troops supported the embarkation of the Valencia división and repulsed Suchet's vanguard at Mataró and Arenis de Mar. Although the Army of Catalonia had been dispersed, on 25 July he was able to defend Montserrat with only 300 troops against Suchet's full forces.

Shortly thereafter, he was appointed deputy commanding general of Catalonia and sub-inspector of Infantry in charge of re-assembling and re-organising the Army of Catalonia. He was quickly able to muster the Regiments and Battalions of Aragon, the Loyal Manresans, the Catalonian cazadors, and the 3rd Hussars Squadron. At the end of September 1811, he resigned his post in order to return to the battlefield.

He participated in the attack on Medas castle (9 September), in the attack on the Muntada battery (24 September), in the surprise night attack on Igualada (2 October), and the attack, the following afternoon, leading a squadron of Cavalry and an Infantry battalion, on a column of 400 grenadiers who had come down from Montserrat to attack the Spanish flank. On 5–7 October, he captured a convoy comprising 700 mules headed for Igualada, destroyed its escort and beating back Frère’s division, which had come to the convoy's aid from the town's garrison, killing 300 of the 500-strong garrison.

On 11 October he took the fortress at Cervera and relieved its garrison, taking 380 or 600 prisoners, according to the source. The following 13 and 14 October, he mined and attacked the castle of Bellpuig, forcing the French to abandon Tárrega and several other fortresses. Eroles was thus able to liberate a third of the territory of Catalonia and to destroy the French supply line from Barcelona to Lérida.

He followed that achievement with a rapid march to Cerdaña, where he surprised General Gavean, forcing him to abandon Puigcerdá, and on 24 October was able to push him back to the vicinity of Mont-Louis, in the Pyrénées-Orientales of France. At the head of 1,500 troops, he penetrated even further into French territory, past Aix, overcoming the local troops that tried to stop him and was able to get hold of a million reales in cash, as well as 3,500 sheep, 300 cows, 80 horses and a lot of wheat.

On 5 December 1811 he faced General Decaen at Sant Celoni, who was unable to move him from his positions; and again at La Garriga two days later, preventing the French forces from taking Vich.

=== 1812 ===
At the combat of Villaseca (18 January 1812) Eroles, at the head of over 3,000 somatenes, ambushed a column of French troops in the village of Vila-seca, Tarragona, taking 600–800 prisoners from General Lafosse’s column, the French general himself only managing to escape with twenty-two of his dragoons /thirty cuirassiers of his escort. Lafosse, the French governor of Tortosa, had been on his way to relieve Tarragona with an infantry battalion and a troop of dragoons, when he was surprised by Eroles. The following day, Lafosse returned to the village with as many men from the Tarragona garrison as could be spared, but was too late to reverse his defeat.

British Commodore Edward Codrington, then commanding a Royal Navy squadron in the Mediterranean Sea charged with harrying French shipping, was present at the combat, having come on shore to confer with Eroles, with whom he often collaborated, regarding an action against Tarragona. Eroles's men also managed to free two Royal Navy captains who had been taken prisoner the previous day by Lafosse's men after having landed at Cape Salou.

The following month, Eroles fought at Altafulla (20 February) and in March, at the defence of Roda de Isábena, Aragón (5 March), where he repelled three attacks by Marshal Suchet’s troops, which outnumbered his own troops by three; Suchet's army lost a general, more than forty officers and hundreds of soldiers.

With only 1,500 troops, Eroles was able to hold the Aragon front for a month and a half against Saverdi's six thousand troops, repelling him again at La Puebla de Segur (18 April).

On 15 July 1812, he participated in preparing the explosion that partially destroyed the castle at Lérida.

Eroles was then sent to the Balearic Islands to co-ordinate with the British squadron its expedition to Sicily. However, the defeat at Castalla made him return to the mainland at Alicante, where he was able to join the Army of Catalonia at the end of August 1812.

At Vasellana (20 September) he repelled a French division. He took the bridge at Tarragona (2 October); at Arbeca y Almillons he captured a whole French column from Lérida.

Around that time Eroles was able to double his forces, reorganising them at Reus; he then supported the retreat at San Martín de Pons (13 November); he later defeated Martin's division, forcing him the abandon the field at Tarragona, and surprising him at Villafranca del Panadés (2 December 1812), forcing him to flee towards Barcelona. At Tarragona, Eroles prevented the French garrison from leaving the city (11 December); that same day, he carried out a successful attack on the castle at Coll de Balaguer, capturing it.

=== 1813 ===
In January 1813 Eroles was appointed, briefly, General in command of the 1st Army which repelled the French forces at Vallagona.

In April, he crossed the Ebro at Almedias (3 April) at the head of three hundred infantrymen and a hundred horse, defeating the French column that tried to prevent them. At Mora de Ebro, he captured the barge-pontoons over which the rest of his troops were able to cross and captured a French convoy. He then went on to surprise the French battery at La Ampolla (4–5 April) and the fort at Perelló (6 de abril).

Eroles repelled an attack by the French garrison from Olot (18 de junio) and the next day destroyed a French column between Besalú y Olot (19 de junio) and went on to win the battle of Bañolas (22 June) against General Lamarque's superior forces. The following month, Eroles fought at La Salud (10 de julio).

=== 1814 ===
In February, he was able, thanks to an elaborate plan, to take Lérida (11th), Mequinenza (12th) and Monzón (13th), capturing their garrisons.

On 14 March he fought at Granollers.

On 24 March 1814, as second-in-command of the Spanish forces in Catalonia, Eroles accompanied his superior, the Capitán General of Catalonia, Francisco Copons y Navia, to the banks of the Fluviá to receive Fernando VII on his return to Spain from his captivity in France. The king himself, on that occasion, promoted Eroles to lieutenant general of Spain's Royal Armies.

Shortly thereafter, he received a letter from the King ordering him to arrest Copons on criminal charges, which he did on the night of 4–5 June 1814 and had him confined at Sigüenza.

== Post-war (1814–1816) ==
On 24 May, Eroles was given the interim command of the Army of Catalonia, command he held until the following September.

In 1814 he was also appointed member of the Real Sociedad Económica Aragonesa de Amigos del País.

In March 1815 he was given the command of the 2nd Infantry Brigade, part of the Army of the Right.

In 1815, he was appointed Honored Academic of the Real Academia de Nobles y Bellas Artes de San Luis of Zaragoza and the following year was appointed to the Real Academia de Buenas Letras de Barcelona.

== Liberal Triennium ==
A believer in absolutism, Eroles opposed the 1820 Liberal Triennium. In November 1820, he returned to Barcelona, only to be expelled following the events of April 1821, and moved to Mallorca. In June that year, the Government authorised his use of the Sicilian nobiliary title of marquis of Cañada Ibáñez.

The following year, he established his headquarters at Talavera de la Reina (Toledo) in May 1822 and then at Cádiz in August. However, the following September, Eroles escaped to join the Royalist forces. As a result, he was declared an enemy of the Nation and the Constitution, expelled from the Army and dispossessed of all his military honours and distinctions.

A notorious conspirator, together with Bernardo Mozo de Rosales, marquis of Mataflorida and the Archbishop of Tarragona, Jaime Creus Martí, Eroles was a member of the Urgel Regency, an interim government established by the Spanish absolutists in August 1822 (during the Triennium) based in Seo de Urgel, a fortress held by the Royalist forces some weeks earlier.

After managing to raise some troops in Catalonia, Eroles was defeated by Espoz y Mina, the then-Captain General of Catalonia, and fled to France.

Eroles returned to Spain in April 1823 with the Hundred Thousand Sons of St. Louis, the French army mobilized by the Bourbon King of France, Louis XVIII, to help the Spanish Royalists restore Ferdinand VII of Spain to the absolute power of which he had been deprived during the Liberal Triennium. The Junta Provisional de Gobierno, presided by Francisco de Eguía, appointed Eroles Captain General of Catalonia in April 1823, post confirmed by the King the following October, around the time Ferdinand VII broke his oath and again repealed the Constitution of Cádiz, declaring null and void the acts and measures of the liberal government.

== Later career ==
Following the fall of the Triennium, Eroles was appointed Captain General of the Royal Armies on 28 December 1824, but died less than a year afterwards, suffering from dementia.

== Cultural references ==
=== Nickname ===
After having wiped out an entire battalion in the mountains of Puigventós (16 April 1811) Eroles came to be known by the enemy as the "Nero of Catalonia" (Diario de Barcelona, 9 August 1811).

=== Copla ===
The Official Chronicler of the City of Madrid from 1966 to 1983, Federico Carlos Sáinz de Robles, mentions in his essay Autobiography of Madrid, a popular copla in Madrid in 1814 and 1815 about Eroles and two other generals, Francisco Javier de Elío (executed for treason during the Triennium) and Francisco de Eguía, the three of whom were considered "uncouth, fanatical and cruel":

Eguía, Eroles, Elío...
Dios te libre de los tres;
porque si Dios no te libra,
¡Santíguate y muérete!
¡Santíguate y muérete!
(Eguía, Eroles, Elío...
God save you from the three
because if God doesn't save you
Make the sign of the cross and prepare to die!
Make the sign of the cross and prepare to die!)

=== Benito Pérez Galdós ===
Benito Pérez Galdós refers to Eroles on several occasions in his 1877 novel Los Cien Mil Hijos de San Luis (Hundred Thousand Sons of Saint Louis), part of his Episodios Nacionales. The following is an example:

These were the Baron de Eroles and don Jaime Creux, Archbishop of Tarragona, both of them, just like Mataflorida, from the humblest of classes, brought out of obscurity by these revolutionary times, which wasn't really a very strong argument in favour of absolutism. A Regency destined to re-establish the Throne and the Altar should be constituted of people of good breeding. But the times of commotion in which we lived meant otherwise, and even absolutism had to enlist its people from among the plebs. This fact, which had been observed since the previous century, was expressed by Louis XV, when he said that the nobility needed to be covered in manure in order to be made fertile.
Of these three regents, the most likeable was Mataflorida, who was also the most learned; the most tolerant was Eroles, and the most evil and unpleasant, Don Jaime Creux. It cannot be said that these men had been slow in developing their brilliant careers. Eroles was a student in 1808 and a lieutenant-general in 1816. The other, from obscure cleric, became a bishop, in reward for his betrayal of las Cortes in '14. (Pérez Galdós: Los Cien Mil Hijos de San Luis, 1877, p. 38.)

== See also ==
- Guerrilla warfare in the Peninsular War
