= Bernardo Mozo de Rosales =

Spanish minister and jurist

Bernardo Mozo de Rosales, Marquis de Mataflorida
- Born: 20 August 1757; Seville, Spain
- Died: 4 July 1832 (aged 74) Agen, France

Bernardo Mozo de Rosales, Marquis de Mataflorida (20 August 1757 in Seville or 1762 – 3 or 4 July 1832 in Agen) was a Spanish lawyer and politician.

From February 1814, Mozo de Rosales was meeting regularly with other deputies, including the Count de La Bisbal, to discuss the creation of a common front against the liberal reforms, and which resulted in the Manifiesto de los Persas, encouraging Fernando VII to restore absolutism. Signed by sixty-nine deputies of the Cortes of Cádiz, the document was redacted by Mozo de Rosales.

== Urgel Regency ==
Together with Baron de Eroles and the Archbishop of Tarragona, Jaime Creus Martí, Mataflorida was a member of the Urgel Regency, an interim government established by the Spanish absolutists in August 1822 (during the Liberal Triennium) based in Seo de Urgel, a fortress held by the Royalist forces.

== Cultural references ==
=== Benito Pérez Galdós ===
Benito Pérez Galdós refers to Mataflorida on several occasions in his Episodios Nacionales, including in the following example:

These were the Baron de Eroles and don Jaime Creux, Archbishop of Tarragona, both of them, just like Mataflorida, from the humblest of classes, brought out of obscurity by these revolutionary times, which wasn't really a very strong argument in favour of absolutism. A Regency destined to re-establish the Throne and the Altar should be constituted of people of good breeding. But the times of commotion in which we lived meant otherwise, and even absolutism had to enlist its people from among the plebs. This fact, which had been observed since the previous century, was expressed by Louis XV, when he said that the nobility needed to be covered in manure in order to be made fertile.
Of these three regents, the most likeable was Mataflorida, who was also the most learned; the most tolerant was Eroles, and the most evil and unpleasant, Don Jaime Creux. It cannot be said that these men had been slow in developing their brilliant careers. Eroles was a student in 1808 and a lieutenant-general in 1816. The other, from obscure cleric, became a bishop, in reward for his betrayal of las Cortes in '14. (Pérez Galdós: Los Cien Mil Hijos de San Luis, 1877, p. 38.)
