= Carlos de España =

French-born Spanish general

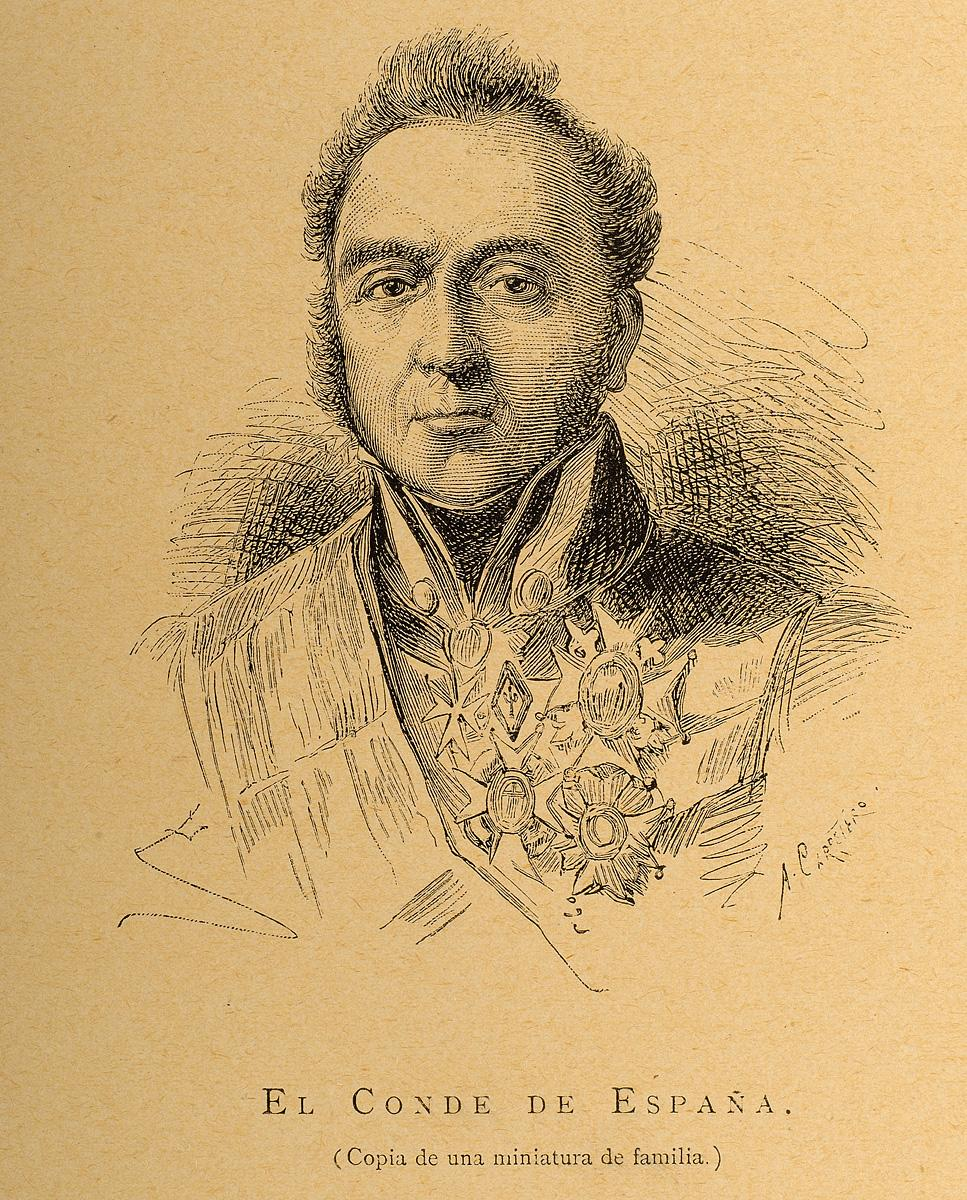
- Portrait of de España
- Born: 15 August 1775; Ramefort (Haute-Garonne), France
- Died: 2 November 1836 (aged 61) Organyà, Spain
- Allegiance: Kingdom of Spain
- Branch: Spanish Army
- Rank: Lieutenant General
- Conflicts: Peninsular War; Battle of the Gebora; Battle of Albuera; Siege of Badajoz; Battle of Salamanca; Battle of Vitoria; Siege of Pamplona

Carlos de España, 1st Conde de España (15 August 1775 – 1839), also known as Charles d'Espagnac or, from 1817, Carlos d'Espagne, was a French-born Spanish general who saw distinguished service in the Peninsular War, and as governor of Barcelona, was an opponent of Spanish liberals. In his letters and dispatches, Wellington refers to him as Carlos de España.

== Early career ==
He was the son of French General Henri Bernardo d’Espagnac, 2nd Marquis d' Espagnac de Ramefort, and Clara Carlota de Cabalby.
He fought with his father in the 1792 campaign against the revolution in the Army of the Princes. After its failure, he went to Holland and then to England. In 1793, he fought in Flanders with his brothers Andrew and Arnold in the Royal Emigrants Regiment, and later that year he joined his father in Spain, accompanied by Andrew.
Between 1794 and 1796, he fought in Catalonia in the ranks of the Royal Legion, later called the Queen's Battalion. The Bourbon Regiment was formed from the remnants of all the émigré units, and he joined it with the rank of captain. With this regiment, he went to Majorca, where he met Dionisia Rossiñol, whom he married on January 20, 1804. They had three children.

== Peninsular War ==
He fought at the Battle of the Gebora, and was wounded fighting under the orders of General Beresford at the Battle of Albuera. Following that battle, he was promoted to field marshal.

On 1 June 1811, and now a brigadier general, Carlos de España's 1st Division, part of General Francisco Javier Castaños's 5th Army, or Army of Estremadura, numbered 3,476 men present under arms.

In March 1812, he was wounded again at the Siege of Badajoz, fighting under the orders of the then Earl of Wellington, under whose orders he also fought at Salamanca. At this battle however, Wellington's decisive victory over Marshal Marmont's army was tainted by Carlos de España having withdrawn, without orders and without informing Wellington, his detachment from the bridge at Alba de Tormes, thereby providing the retreating French troops with an escape route, which Wellington had counted on being blocked.

Following Salamanca, Wellington appointed him governor of Madrid, city he was ordered to abandon, along with Hill's troops, on Wellington's orders, just hours before the French advance cavalry entered the city again the following 1 November.

He was again wounded at the Siege of Pamplona in 1813.
He saw further action at the Battle of Bayonne and at Vitoria, where he was again wounded.

For his services, King Ferdinand VII of Spain granted him the title of Conde de España (Count of Spain) in 1819.

== Post-war career ==
Exiled to the Balearic Islands during the Trienio Liberal (1820-1823), he supported the reaction embodied by the Royalist Urgel Regency. He also represented his sovereign in Paris, Vienna, and at the Congress of Verona (1822) in the negotiations undertaken with the Quintuple Alliance.
He returned to Spain with the French armies during the 1823 expedition and was appointed Captain General and Viceroy of Navarre in 1823 and of Aragon in 1824-1825, where he suppressed the ultra-conservative rebellion of Jorge Bessières.
Ferdinand VII rewarded him in 1826, by granting him the title of Grandee of Spain and appointing him Captain General of Catalonia (1827-1832). The Count distinguished himself there by the ruthlessness with which he suppressed the 1827 revolt of the Aggrieved.

== Carlist War ==
After the death of Ferdinand VII in 1833, he sided with the pretender Carlos de Borbón and commanded the Catalan Carlists in the First Carlist War.

He was assassinated in 1839 by his own escort while crossing a bridge over the river Segre, near Organya, in accordance with the instructions of the main Carlist leaders in Catalonia. They believed he was prepared to surrender to Espartero, shortly before the Convention of Vergara. His body was thrown into the river with a stone around his neck.
