= The Peninsular War 1808–14 =

1973 board game

The Peninsular War 1808–14 is a board game published in 1973 by Rostherne Games which focuses on the Peninsular War.

== Contents ==
The Peninsular War 1808–14 is a game in which the allied armies of Britain, Spain and Portugal defend against the invaders from France.

== Reception ==
Ellis Simpson reviewed The Peninsular War 1808–14 for Games International magazine, and gave it 2 stars out of 5, and stated that "A near miss from the hard core market, who would welcome a quick and easy to play wargame. For the less complex gamer or the novice it is likely to be very welcome entertainment."
