= Jaime Creus Martí =

Spanish cleric

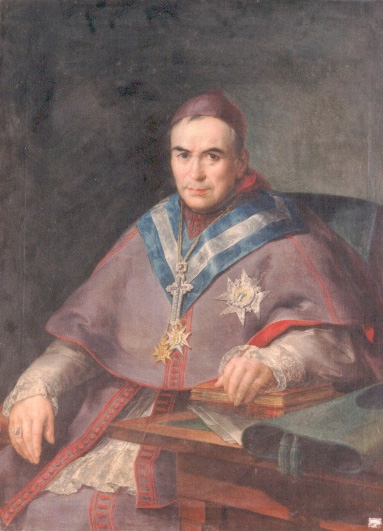
- Church: Roman Catholic

Personal details
- Born: 20 June 1760 Mataró (Barcelona), Spain
- Died: 17 September 1825 (aged 65) Tarragona, Spain

Jaime Creus Martí was a Spanish cleric, Bishop of Menorca (1815–1820) and Archbishop of Tarragona (1820–1825).

He was one of the three members, together with Bernardo Mozo de Rosales, Marquis of Mataflorida and Baron de Eroles, of the Urgel Regency (1822-23), established during the Liberal Triennium (Trienio Liberal), by the Spanish absolutists, or Royalists, supporters of Fernando VII, who opposed the Constitutional Government that (basing itself on the Spanish Constitution of 1812) had resulted from the Spanish Revolution of 1820.
