= Congress of Verona =

Conference to decide post-Napoleonic Europe

Coordinates: 45°26′21″N 10°59′39″E

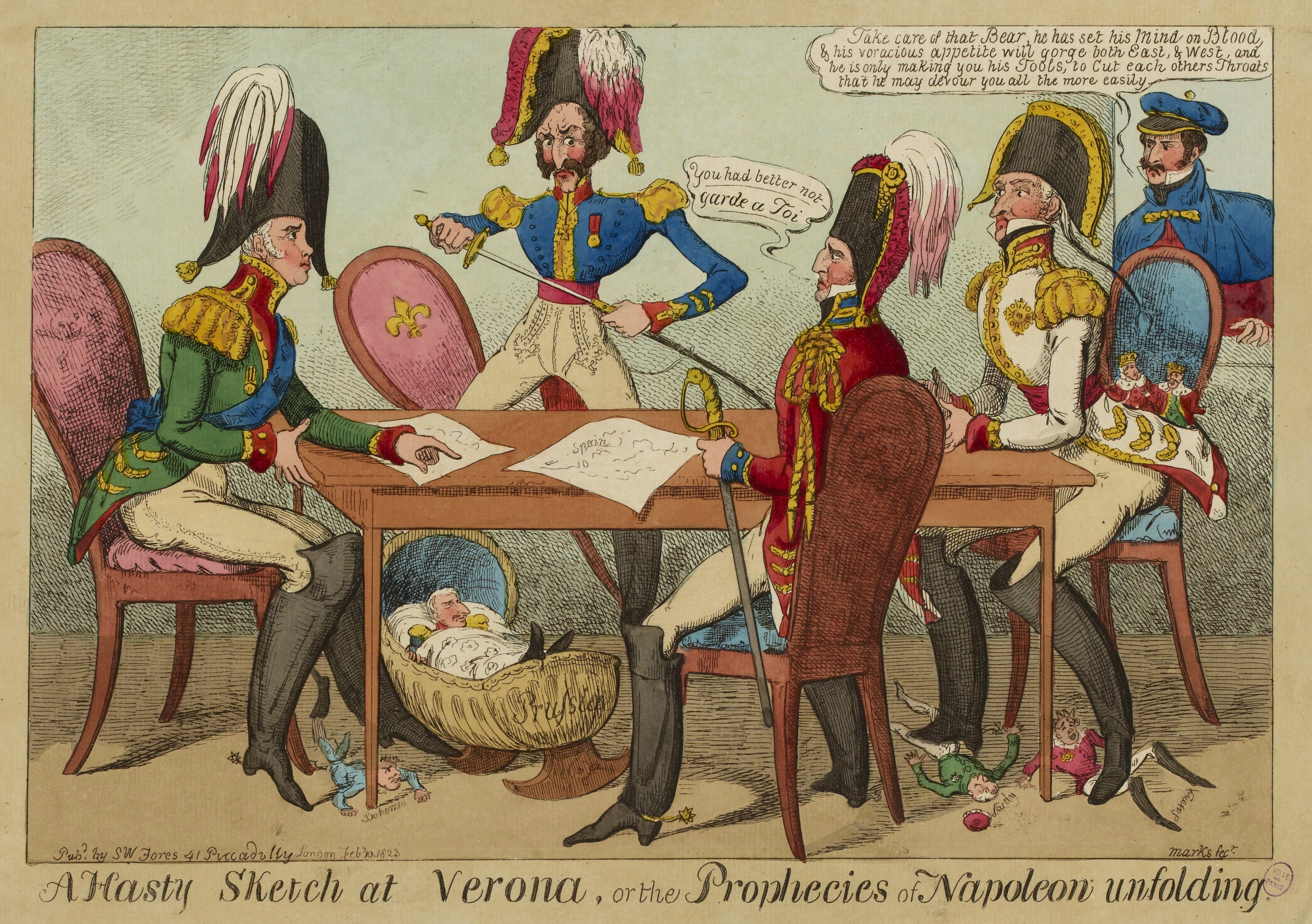
Satirical depiction of the Congress of Verona.

The Congress of Verona met at Verona from 20 October to 14 December 1822 as part of the series of international conferences or congresses that opened with the Congress of Vienna in 1814–15, which had instituted the Concert of Europe at the close of the Napoleonic Wars. At the time, Verona was part of the Kingdom of Lombardy–Venetia, itself under Austrian rule.

== Representation ==
The Quintuple Alliance was represented by the following persons:

- Russia: Emperor Alexander I and Count Karl Robert Nesselrode (minister of foreign affairs). Count George Mocenigo (Ambassador of Russia in Turin) was also present;
- Austria: Prince Metternich;
- Prussia: Prince Hardenberg and Count Christian Gunther von Bernstorff;
- France: Anne-Adrien-Pierre de Montmorency-Laval (minister of Foreign Affairs) and François-René de Chateaubriand;
- United Kingdom: The Duke of Wellington, who was taking the place of Foreign Secretary Lord Londonderry after the latter's suicide on the eve of the congress. Accompanying Wellington was the British ambassador to Austria, the new Lord Londonderry, the younger brother of the former Foreign Secretary.

Aside from the five leading powers a variety of other nations were represented in Verona, marking the largest gathering since Vienna seven years earlier. The attendees included Oscar, Crown Prince of Sweden.

A delegation of Greeks, currently fighting for their independence, was turned away at Ancona. Recognition was also refused to representatives of the Urgel Regency of Spain, royalist opponents of the country's liberal government.

== Issues ==
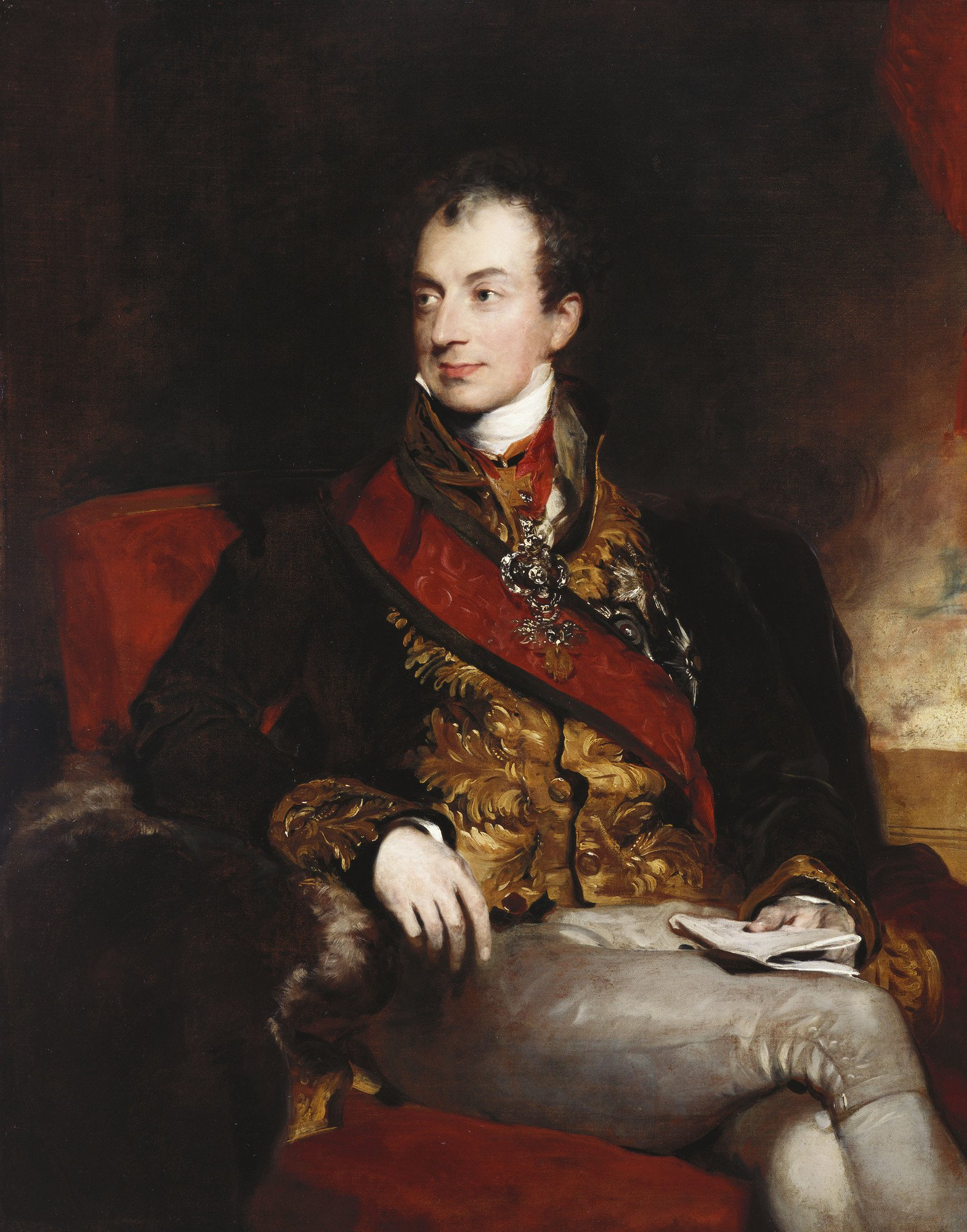
Portrait of Prince Metternich by Thomas Lawrence.

While the representatives of the United Kingdom and the other European powers had at first, during the Congress of Vienna, acted largely in concert, the extent to which the concord epitomized in the expression the "Concert of Europe" had unraveled in seven years became apparent in the way in which the three main questions before this Congress were handled.

The instructions drawn up by Londonderry, as he then was, for his own guidance, had been handed to Wellington by George Canning without alteration. They defined the British position towards the three questions which it was supposed would be discussed: the Eastern question (currently surfacing in the Greek insurrection), the question of intervention in favor of the Bourbon royal power in Spain and the revolted Spanish colonies in America, and the Italian Question.

=== Italian Question ===
The matter of the Italian Question dealt with the continued Austrian rule in Northern Italy. Since Britain could not undertake to support a system in which she had merely acquiesced, Wellington did not even formally present his credentials until the other Powers had disposed of the matter, and the British diplomat Charles Vane, 3rd Marquess of Londonderry (Castlereagh's half-brother and successor in the Londonderry title) attended merely to keep informed and to see that nothing was done inconsistent with the European system and the treaties.

=== Greek Question ===
In the Greek Question, the probable raising of which had alone induced the British government to send a minister plenipotentiary to the Congress, Wellington was instructed to suggest the eventual necessity for recognizing the belligerent rights of the Greeks, and, in the event of concerted intervention, to be careful not to commit Britain, beyond a supporting role. (See Greek War of Independence.)

As for Russia and Austria, the immediate problems arising out of the Greek Question had already been privately settled between the Emperor Alexander and Metternich, to their mutual satisfaction, at the preliminary conferences held at Vienna in September.

=== Spanish Question ===
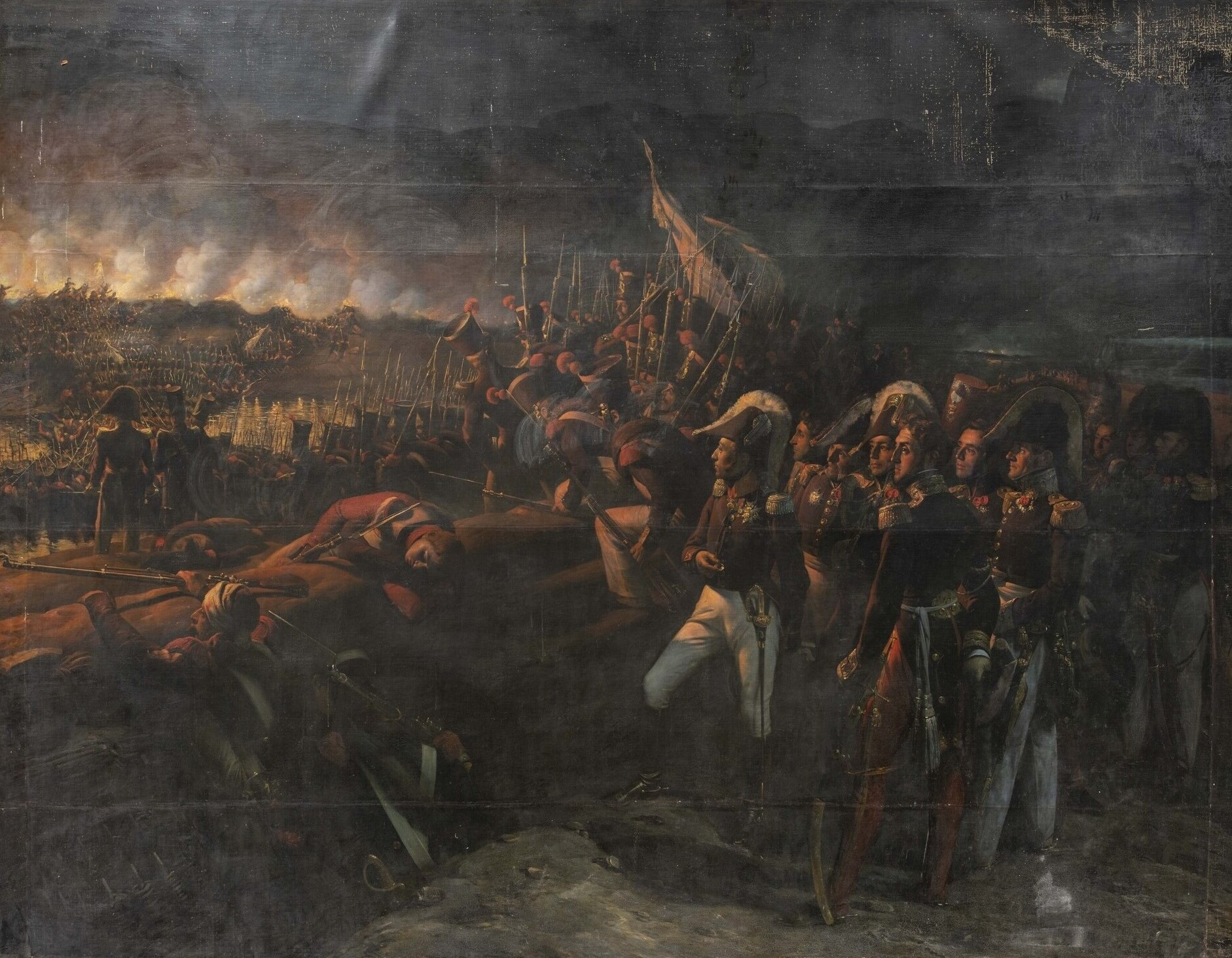
The Battle of Trocadero in 1823

When the plenipotentiaries met in Verona, the only question raised was the Spanish Question, of the proposed French intervention in Spain, in which Wellington's instructions were to express London's uncompromising opposition to the whole principle of intervention.

The discussion was opened by three questions formally propounded by Montmorency:

1. Would the Allies withdraw their ministers from Madrid in the event of France being compelled to do so?
2. In case of war, under what form and by what acts would the powers give France their moral support, so as to give to her action the force of the Quintuple Alliance, and inspire a salutary fear in the revolutionaries of all countries?
3. What material aid would the powers give if asked by France to intervene, under restrictions which France would declare and they would recognize?

A series of gilt-copper medals apparently struck in England represent participants of the Congress in less than flattering lights: the "Count de Chateaubriand" (Ludwig Ernst Bramsen, Médallier) bears an inscription that offers the British view of the French position in a nutshell: "The King of France, my master, demands the freedom of Ferdinand VII to give his people institutions which they cannot hold but from him", while the Emperor Francis I of Austria asserts "My troops occupy Naples to chastise the Neapolitans for daring to change their constitution."

The reply of Alexander, who expressed his surprise at the desire of France to keep the intervention wholly French, was to offer to march 150,000 Russians through Germany to Piedmont, where they could be held ready to act against any Jacobins, whether in Spain or France. This solution appealed as little to Metternich and Montmorency as to Wellington; but though united in opposing it, four days of confidential communications revealed a fundamental difference of opinion. Wellington, firmly based on the principle of non-intervention, refused to have anything to do with the suggestion, made by Metternich, that the powers should address a common note to the Spanish government in support of the action of France. Finally, Metternich proposed that the Allies should hold a common language, but in separate notes, though uniform in their principles and objects. This solution was adopted by the continental powers; but Wellington, in accordance with his instructions not to countenance any intervention in Spanish affairs, took no part in the conferences that followed. On October 30 the powers handed in their formal replies to the French memorandum.

Russia, Austria and Prussia would act as France should in respect of withdrawing their ministers, and would give to France every assistance she might require, the details to be specified in a treaty. Wellington, on the other hand, replied on behalf of Great Britain that having no knowledge of the cause of dispute, and not being able to form a judgment upon a hypothetical case, he could give no answer to any of the questions.

Thus was proclaimed the open breach of Britain with the principles and policy of the Quintuple Alliance, as it had become with the admission of France in 1818, which development is what gives to the congress its main historical interest. The ensuing French intervention ended with the Battle of Trocadero, which reinstated Ferdinand VII of Spain and opened a reactionary period of Spanish and European politics that led to the Year of Revolutions, 1848.
