= Bernard-Georges-François Frère =

French noble and general

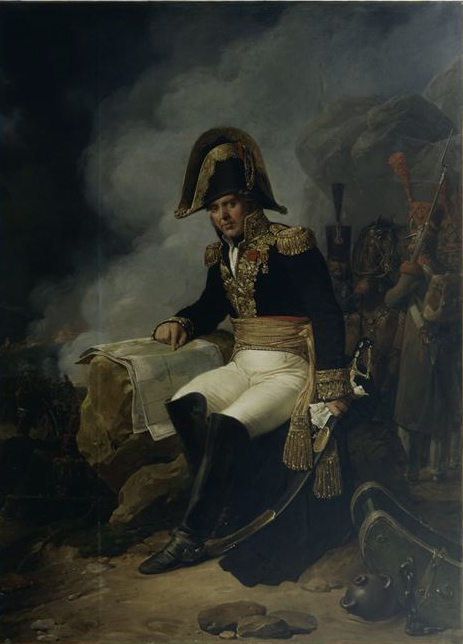
- Born: 8 January 1762; Montréal, Languedoc, Kingdom of France
- Died: 16 February 1826 (aged 62); Paris, France
- Military career
- Allegiance: Kingdom of France (1791-1792), French First Republic, First French Empire, Bourbon Restoration
- Branch: Infantry
- Service years: 1791–1815
- Rank: General of Division
- Conflicts: French Revolutionary Wars, Napoleonic Wars
- Awards: Count of the Empire
- Other work: Commander of the military division of Rennes, commander of the military division of Lille.

Bernard-Georges-François Frère, Count of the Empire, (French pronunciation: [bɛʁnaʁ ʒɔʁʒ fʁɑ̃swa fʁɛʁ]; 8 January 1762, in Montréal, Aude – 16 February 1826, in Paris) was a French soldier of the French Revolutionary Wars, who later rose to the top military rank of General of Division, taking part in the Napoleonic Wars.

== Revolutionary Wars ==
A pharmacist in the city of Carcassonne at the outbreak of the French Revolution, Frère exercised this profession until 1791, when he decided to join the army. He was rapidly elected captain and took part to Pyrenees military operations against Spain during the War of the First Coalition. He distinguished himself in battle and gained the rank of chef de battalion (battalion commander) in 1793. Following the signature of the treaty of peace between the Kingdom of Spain and the young French Republic, Frère was assigned to the Army of Italy and took part to several battles, including the assault of the Serra redoubts, where was wounded, and at the battle of Bassano. Sent to serve in Army of England, he failed to take the Saint-Marcouf islands off the coasts of Normandy (9 April 1798). Having spent some time in the Army of Batavia, then in the Army of the Rhine, he was promoted to the rank of brigadier general and given the prestigious command of the infantry of the Consular Guard, then the command of the Grenadiers of the Consular Guard.

== Napoleonic Wars and beyond ==
After the creation of the Grande Armée in 1805, Frère was given a command and was cited several times in the bulletins, during the War of the Third Coalition. The next year, during the War of the Fourth Coalition, he was equally successful, being one of the first commanders to enter Lübeck, after the French led a successful battle against the Prussian defenders under Gebhard Leberecht von Blücher. On 5 June 1807, commanding a single infantry regiment, Frère forced no less than 10,000 Russians to surrender. He was promoted to General of Division in March 1808, before being sent to Spain, where he took the city of Segovia on 7 June 1808 and then served as chief of staff in the Army Corps of Marshal Jean Lannes during the bloody siege of Zaragoza. He was created a Count of the Empire that year and in 1809 was recalled to the Armée d'Allemagne in order to take part to the War of the Fifth Coalition against Austria, serving at the battles of Aspern-Essling and Wagram, where he received a serious wound during the second day of battle. In 1810, Frère was sent to serve in the Army of Catalonia and subsequently recalled to France and appointed at the command of the military division of Rennes. During the Hundred Days, Napoleon entrusted him with the command of the military division of Lille.

The name Frère is one of the names inscribed under the Arc de Triomphe in Paris.

== Sources ==
- Fierro, Alfredo; Palluel-Guillard, André; Tulard, Jean – "Histoire et Dictionnaire du Consulat et de l'Empire”, Éditions Robert Laffont, ISBN 2-221-05858-5
