= Episodios Nacionales =

Novel cycle by Benito Pérez Galdós

The Episodios Nacionales (National Episodes) are a collection of forty-six historical novels written by Benito Pérez Galdós between 1872 and 1912. Divided into five series, they deal with Spanish history from roughly 1805 to 1880 combined with fictional accounts and characters.

== First series ==
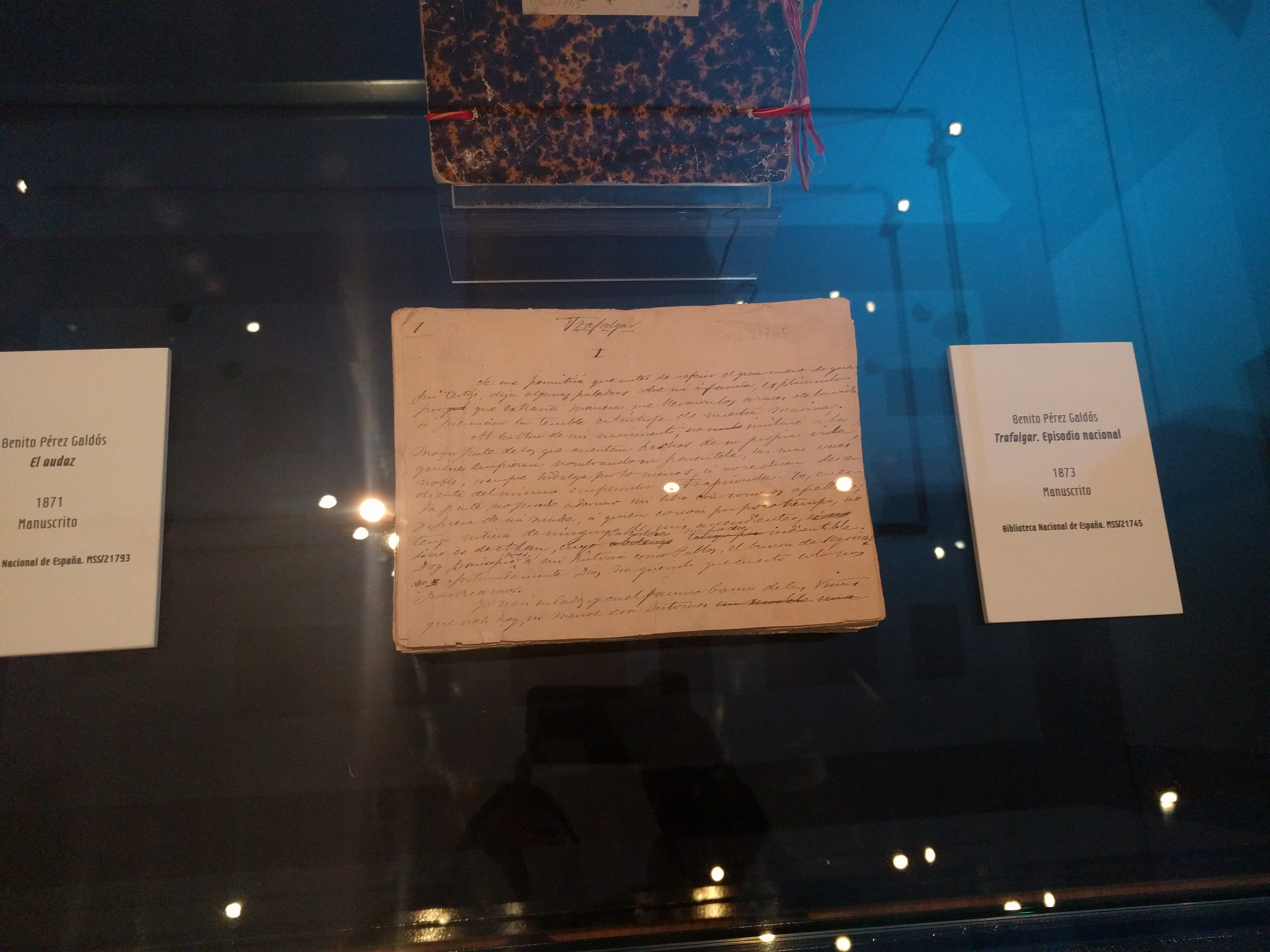
Manuscript of Trafalgar, 1873. Biblioteca Nacional de España.

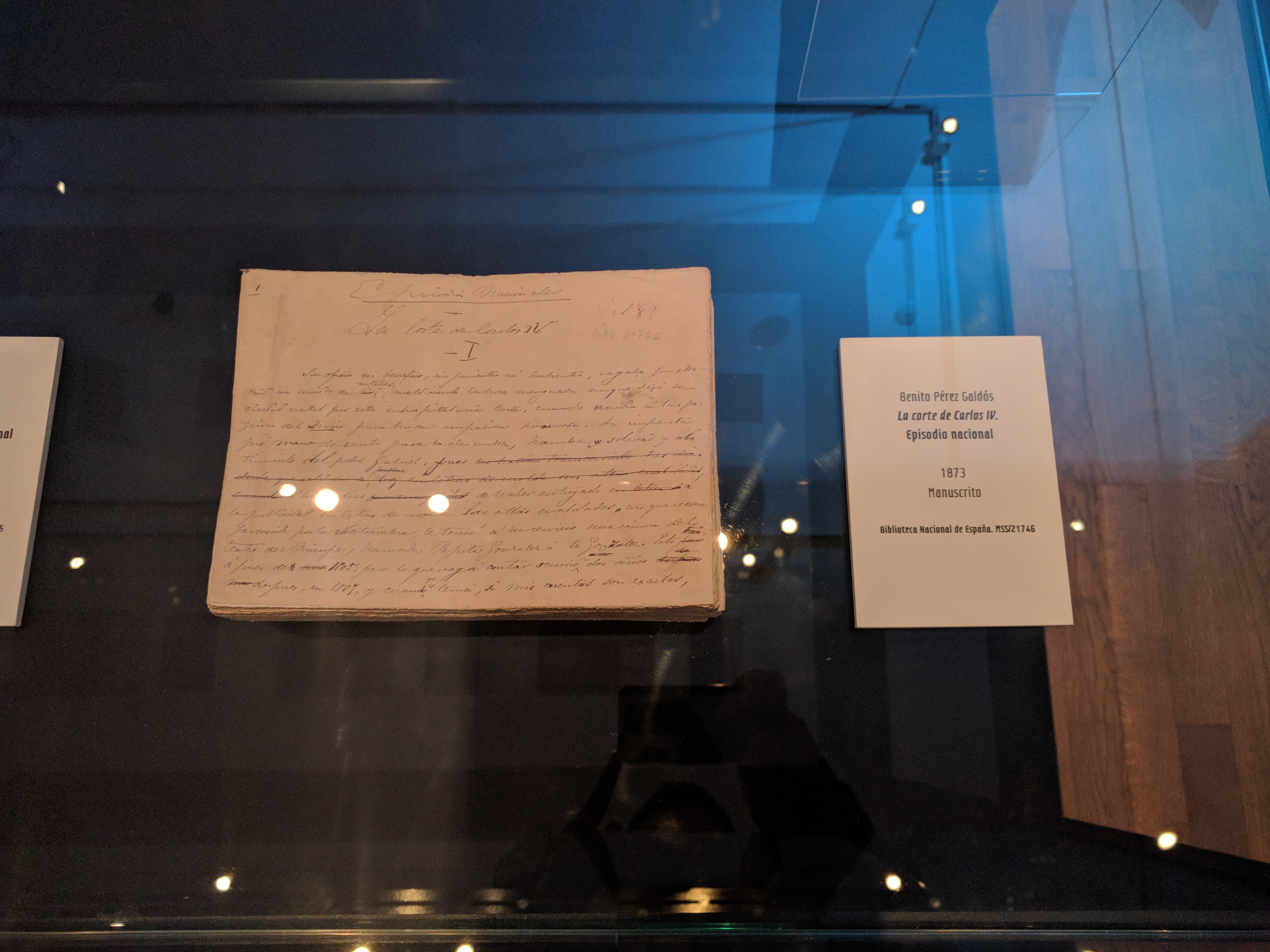
Manuscript of La familia de Carlos IV, 1873. Biblioteca Nacional de España.

With the exception of Gerona, all the episodes follow the adventures of the boy Gabriel de Araceli, beginning in French-dominated Spain through the war of Independence, from the battle of Trafalgar to the defeat of the French armies (1805–1814). There are ten books in this series:

- Trafalgar
- La Corte de Carlos IV [The Court of Charles IV]
- El 19 de marzo y el 2 de mayo [The 19th of March and the 2nd of May]
- Bailén
- Napoleón en Chamartín [Napoleon at Chamartin]
- Zaragoza
- Gerona
- Cádiz
- Juan Martín el Empecinado
- La Batalla de los Arapiles [The Battle of Salamanca]

== Second series ==
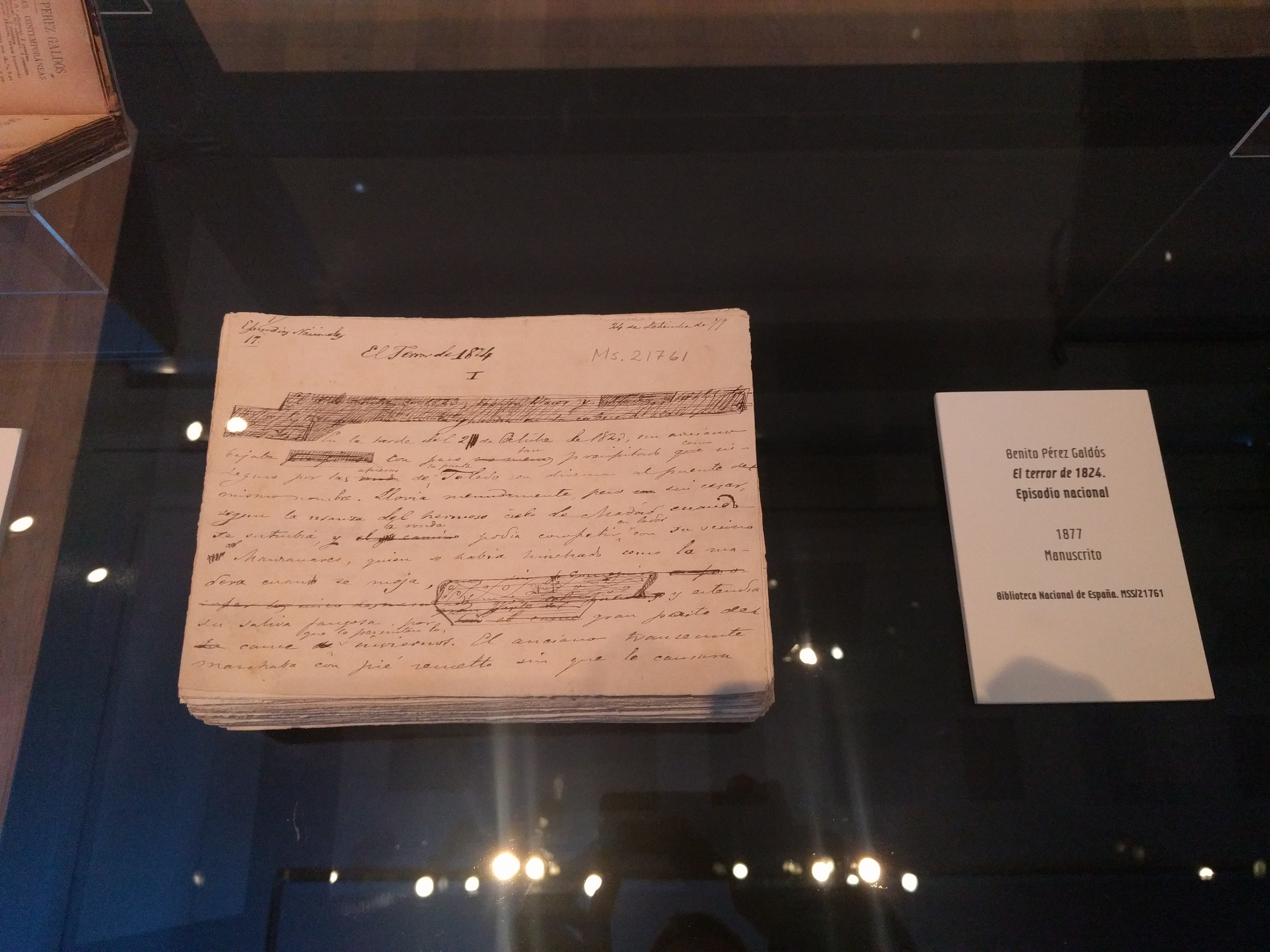
Manuscript of El terror de 1824, 1877. Biblioteca Nacional de España.

Written between 1875 and 1879, it is a series of ten books. Its main character, who is not always the protagonist, is the liberal crusader Salvador Monsalud. At first a guard of King José I, he helps the king escape Spain with the crown jewels, which Jose would sell to pay for his new life in America. Remaining in Spain, Salvador is estranged from power during the six years of the absolutist monarchy of Fernando VII (1814–1820), lauded during the Liberal Triennium (1820–1823) and persecuted during the Ominous Decade (1823–1833). His perpetual dissatisfaction guides us through the convulsions of Spain under Fernando, where future conflicts could be seen to have their beginnings. The titles of the Episodes are:

- El equipaje del rey José (The Baggage of King Jose)
- Memorias de un cortesano de 1815 (Memoires of a Courtesan of 1815)
- La segunda casaca (The Second Turncoat)
- El Grande Oriente (The Grande Oriente)
- El 7 de julio (The 7th of July)
- Los Cien Mil Hijos de San Luis (The 100,000 sons of San Luis)
- El terror de 1824 (The Terror of 1824)
- Un voluntario realista (A Royalist Volunteer)
- Los Apostólicos (The Apostolics)
- Un faccioso más y algunos frailes menos (One More Rebel and a Few Less Friars)

After this series, Galdós did not plan to continue, but after the Spanish–American War (the "Disaster of '98"), he decided to follow with another series.

== Third series ==
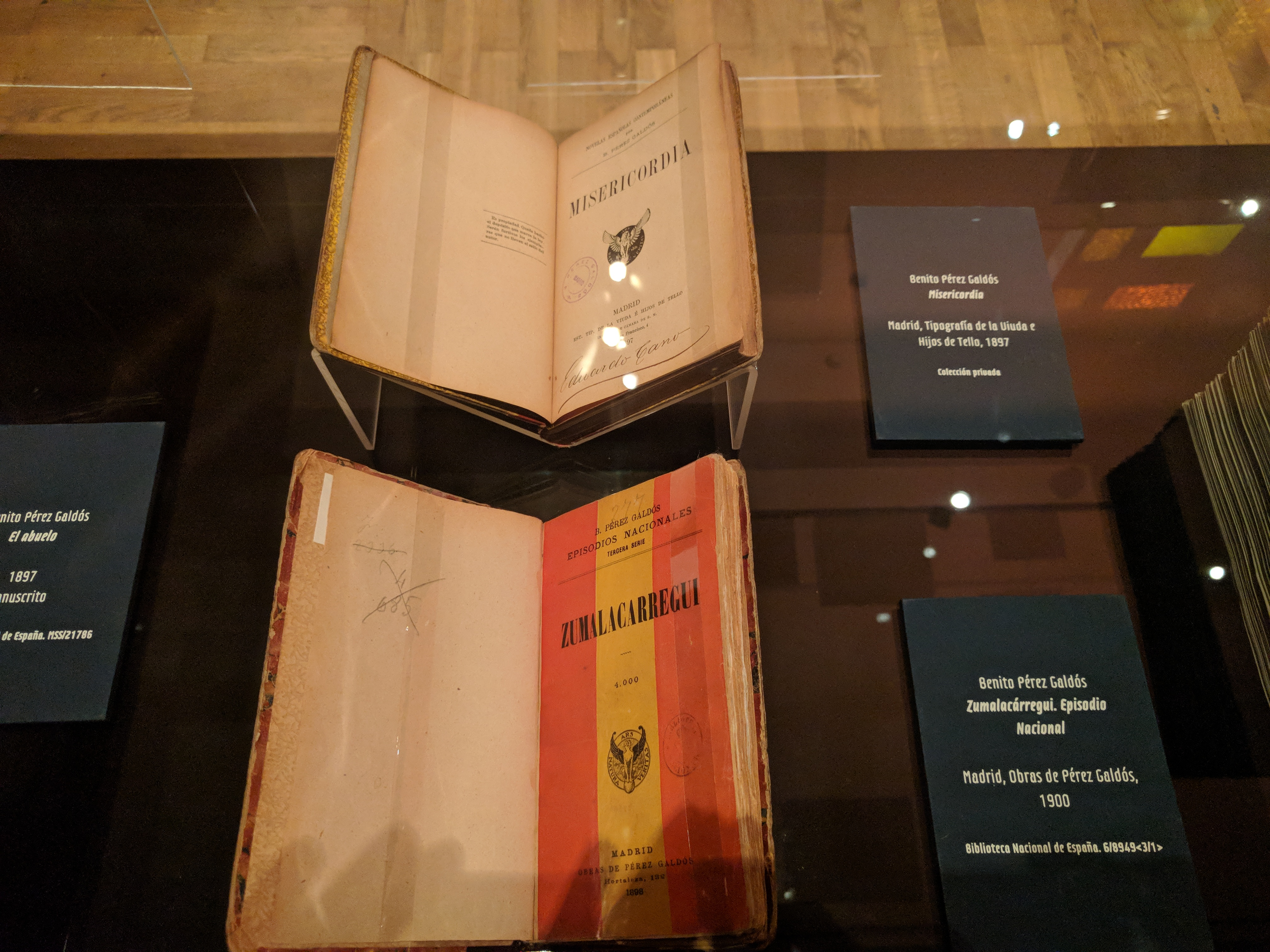
First edition of Zumalacárregui, 1898. Biblioteca Nacional de España.

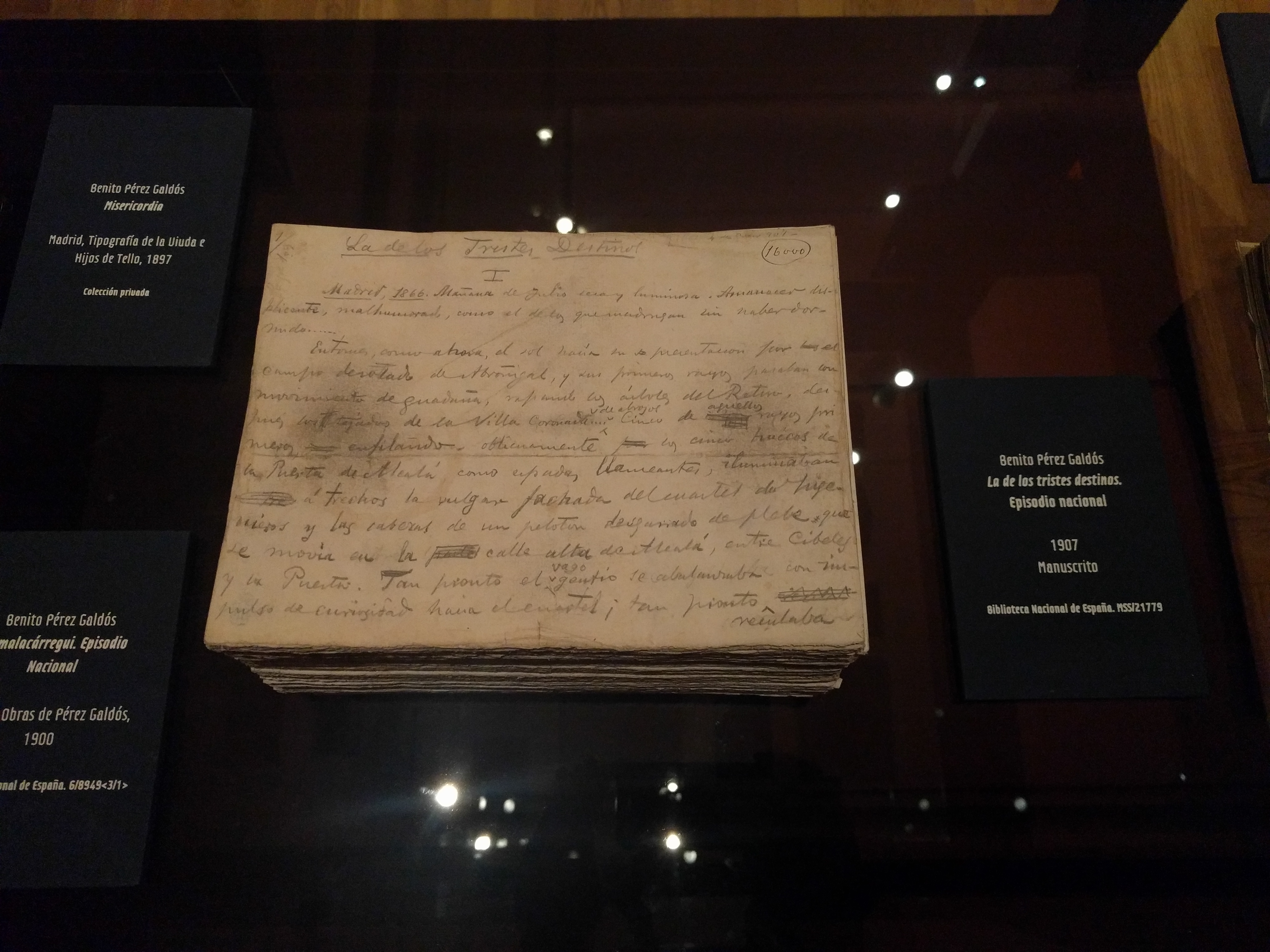
Manuscript of La de los tristes destinos, 1907. Biblioteca Nacional de España.

The divided Spain of the First Carlist War and the Regency of Maria Cristina is the setting of the following episodes, which revolve around the romantic Fernando Calpena. The ten episodes that comprise the series are:

- Zumalacárregui
- Mendizábal
- De Oñate a la Granja (From Oñate to Granja)
- Luchana
- La campaña del Maestrazgo (The Campaign of Maestrazco)
- La estafeta romántica (The Romantic Courier)
- Vergara
- Montes de Oca
- Los Ayacuchos (The Ayacuchans)
- Bodas Reales (Royal Weddings)

== Fourth series ==
José García Fajardo, uninterested in politics, unlike the protagonists of the previous series, is the main character of this series of ten episodes which encompass the entire reign of Isabel II, a contemporary of the author. The titles of this series are:

- Las tormentas del 48 (The Storms of 48)
- Narváez
- Los duendes de la camarilla (The Demons of the Entourage)
- La Revolución de Julio (The July Revolution)
- O'Donnell
- Aita Tettauen
- Carlos VI en la Rápita (Carlos VI in Rápita)
- La vuelta al mundo en la Numancia (The Trip Around the World on the Numancia)
- Prim
- La de los tristes destinos (She of the Sad Destinies)

== Fifth series ==
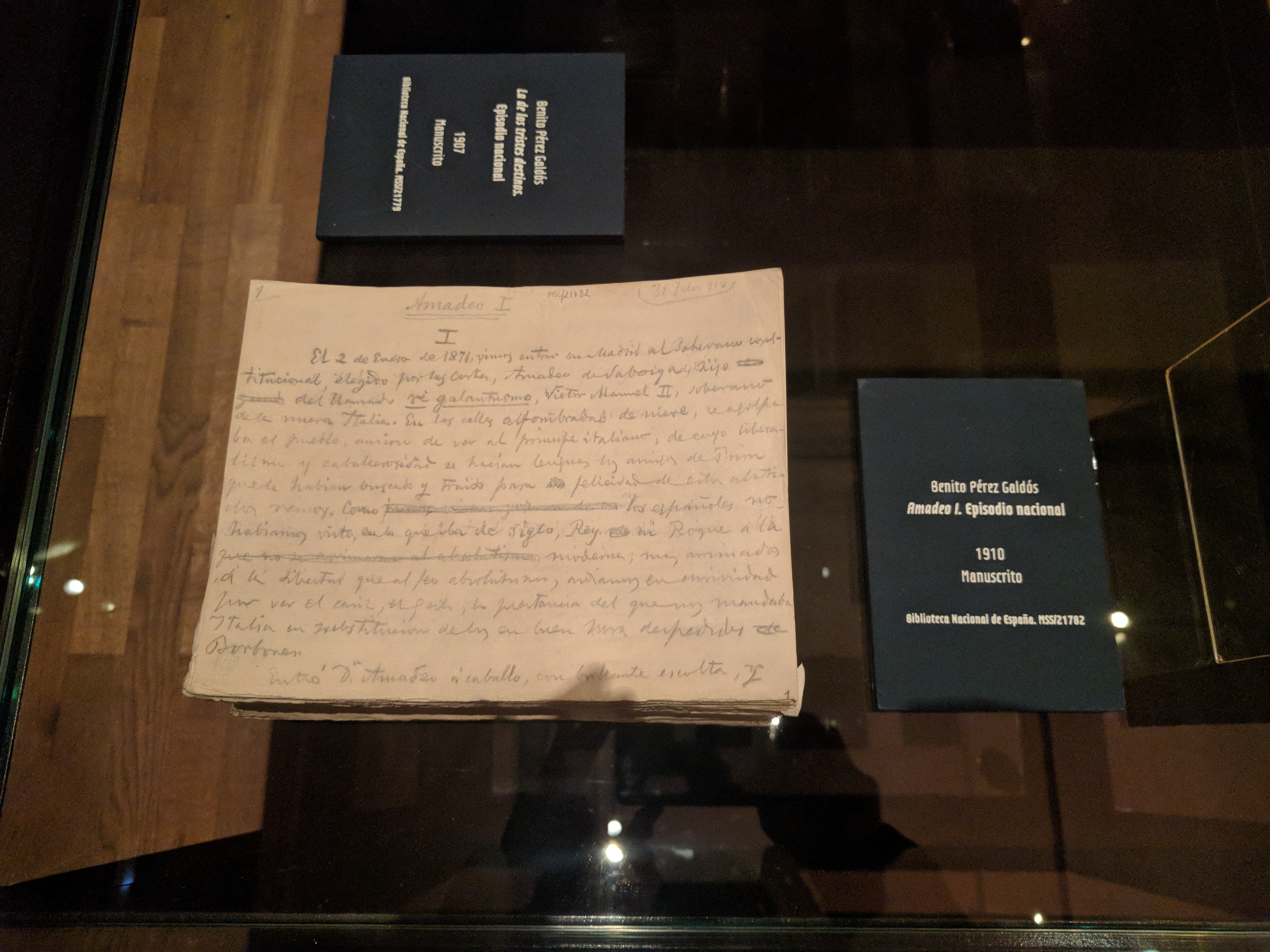
Manuscript of Amadeo I, 1910. Biblioteca Nacional de España.

Tito, a first-person narrator who is not a real person, but a conceit of the author to create thoughtful dialogue, is featured in this unfinished series, which begins during the Glorious Revolution in Spain, and contains only six published titles and a draft:

- España sin rey (Spain Without a King)
- España trágica (Tragic Spain)
- Amadeo I
- La Primera República (The First Republic)
- De Cartago a Sagunto (From Carthage to Sagunto)
- Cánovas
- Sagasta (draft)
