= Charles Felix Smith =

British army officer

Lieutenant-General Sir Charles Felix Smith KCB

Acting Governor of Trinidad; of Demerara; of Berbice; of St. Lucia; and of Gibraltar.

Personal details
- Born: 9 July 1786 Burn Hall, County Durham
- Died: 11 August 1858 (aged 71) Worthing, Sussex

Military service
- Allegiance: United Kingdom
- Branch/service: British Army
- Years of service: 1802–1856
- Rank: Lieutenant-General
- Unit: Royal Engineers
- Battles/wars: Napoleonic Wars; Peninsular War; Hundred Days; Second Egyptian–Ottoman War

Lieutenant-General Sir Charles Felix Smith KCB (1786 – 1858), was an officer of the British Royal Engineers, of which he was colonel-commandant from 1856. He was acting Governor of Trinidad in 1828, 1830, and 1831; acting Governor of Demerara and of Berbice in 1833; acting Governor of St. Lucia in 1834; and acting Governor of Gibraltar in 1838. He received the Orders of Carlos III and of San Fernando of Spain in 1814, and the Ottoman Order of Glory in 1841.

== Early years ==
Charles Felix Smith, who born on 9 July 1786 at Piercefield, Monmouthshire, was the second son of George Smith of Burn Hall, County Durham, by Juliet, who was the daughter and the sole heiress of Richard Mott of Carlton, Suffolk. The orientalist Elizabeth Smith (1776 – 1806) was his sister, and the St John's College, Cambridge, theologian George Smith (1693 – 1756) was his great-grandfather. Charles Felix joined the Royal Military Academy, Woolwich on 15 June 1801, and was commissioned as second lieutenant in the Royal Engineers on 1 October 1802, and was promoted to first lieutenant on 9 October 1802, as which he was sent to the south-eastern military district defences of the south coast of Kent.

== West Indies, 1804–1810 ==
On 16 December 1804, Felix embarked for the West Indies, where he served under Sir Charles Shipley, the commanding Royal Engineer. He was promoted to be second captain on 18 November 1807. In December 1807 he accompanied the expedition under General Bowyer from Barbados against the Danish West India Islands, and took part under Shipley in the operations which resulted in the capture of St. Thomas, St. John, and Santa Cruz. In January 1809 he accompanied the expedition under Sir George Beckwith to attack Martinique, and took part under Shipley in the attack on, and capture of, Pigeon Island on 4 February, and in the siege and capture of Fort Bourbon, which led to the capitulation of the whole island on 23 February. He was severely wounded on this occasion, and on his return to England on 31 March 1810 he received an annual pension of 100l. for his wounds.

== Spain, 1810–1813 ==
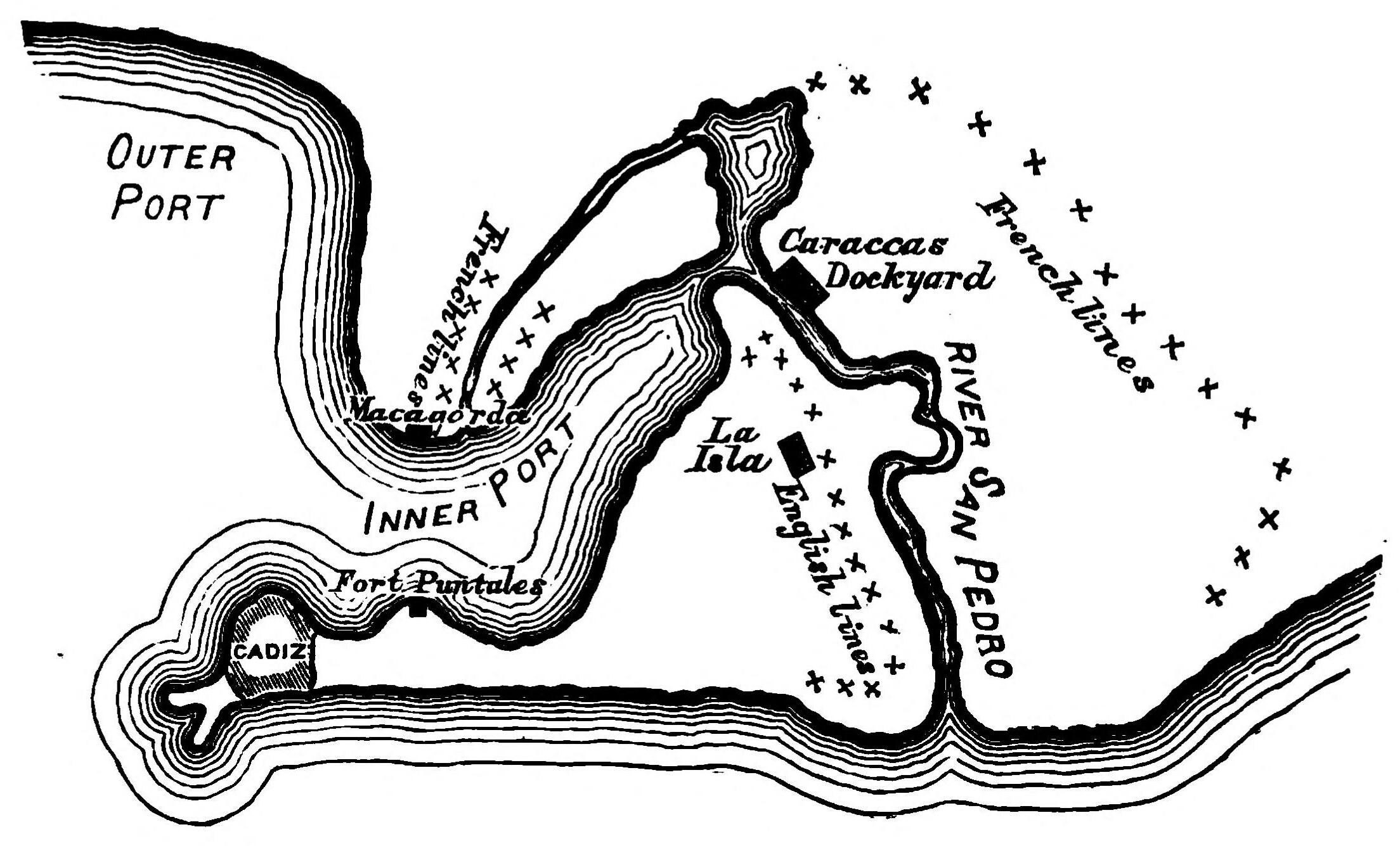
Defence of Cadiz, 1810–1812

On 25 October 1810 Smith embarked for the Iberian Peninsula, and joined the force of Sir Thomas Graham at Cadiz, then blockaded by the French. In the spring of 1811 an attempt to raise the siege of Cadiz was made by sending a force by water to Tarifa to march on the flank of the enemy, while at the same time a sortie was made by the garrison of Cadiz and La Isla across the river San Pedro. Smith was left in Cadiz as senior engineer officer in charge of it, as well as of La Isla and the adjacent country, during the operations which comprised the Battle of Barrosa, on 5 March 1811. In spite of this victory the siege was not raised, and the British retired within the lines of La Isla.

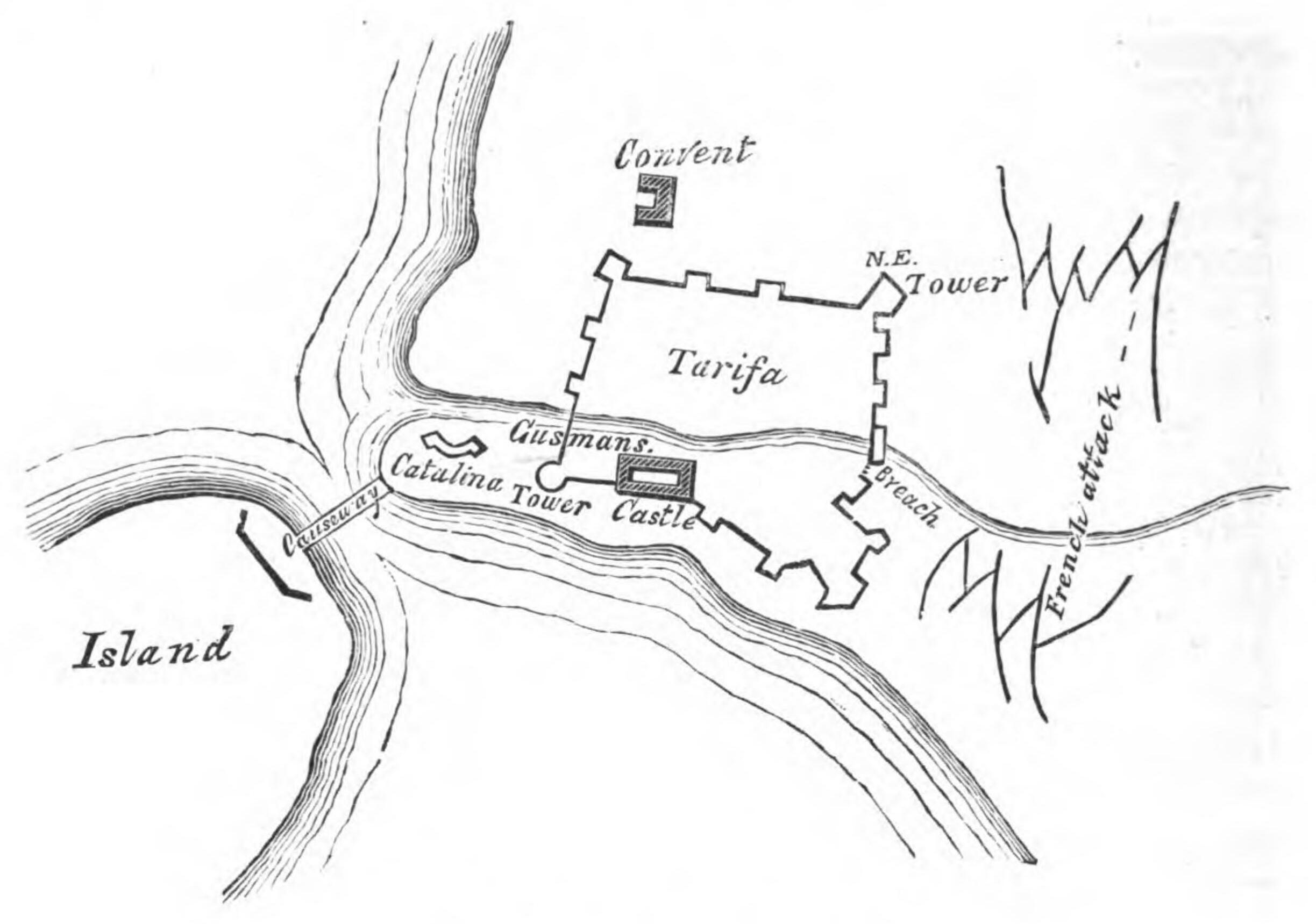
Defence of Tarifa, 1811–1812

Smith's health suffered a good deal at Cadiz, and he was sent to Tarifa, near Gibraltar, to be Commanding Royal Engineer during the siege of Tarifa by the 8000 strong French force under General Laval. Colonel John Skerrett commanded the garrison of drafts from regiments at Gibraltar, with Spanish details, of 2,300 in total. The outposts were driven in on 19 December, and in ten days the French batteries opened fire. During this time Smith was busy making such preparations as he could for the defence of a very weak place. When, however, a gaping breach was made by the French after a few hours' firing, Skerrett called a council of war, proposed to abandon the defence, to embark the garrison on board the transports lying in the roadstead, and to sail for Gibraltar. Smith vehemently opposed the proposal, and prepared to make the most desperate resistance. Intimation of the state of affairs was sent to the Governor of Gibraltar, who promptly removed the transports and so compelled Skerrett to hold out. He also arranged to send assistance from Gibraltar. On 31 December 1811 the French made an unsuccessful assault. Bad weather and a continuous downpour of rain greatly damaged the French batteries and trenches, and supply became difficult owing to the state of the roads. On the night of 4 January 1812 it became known to the garrison that the French were preparing to raise the siege, and on the morning of the 5th the allies assumed the offensive, drove the French from their batteries and trenches, and compelled them to make a hurried retreat, leaving everything in the hands of the garrison. By general consent the chief merit of the defence has been given to Smith. Napier, in his History of the War in the Peninsula, points out that though Skerrett eventually yielded to Smith's energy, he did it with reluctance, and constantly during the siege impeded the works by calling off the labourers to prepare posts of retreat. "To the British engineer," Napier writes, "belongs the praise of this splendid action".

Smith was promoted for his services at Tarifa to be brevet major, to date from 31 December 1811. He was promoted to be first captain in the Royal Engineers on 12 April 1812, and returned to Cadiz, where he was commanding Royal Engineer until the siege was raised in July 1812. In 1813 he took part in the Battle of Osma (18 June 1813), the Battle of Vitoria (21 June), and the engagements at Villa Franca and Tolosa (24 and 25 June), when he had a horse shot under him. He accompanied Sir Thomas Graham on 1 July to take part in the siege of San Sebastian. On the visit of the Duke of wellington on 12 July, he attended him round the positions as senior officer (for the time being) of Royal Engineers, and his proposed plans of operation met with Wellington's approval. The city fell on 9 September, and, having been mentioned in Graham's despatch, Smith was promoted to be brevet lieutenant-colonel on 21 September 1813 "for conduct before the enemy at San Sebastian".

== England, 1814–1815 ==
Smith arrived in Belgium and Holland from the south of France in July 1814, after the conclusion of peace, and reached England in August. He was knighted by the Prince Regent on 10 November, and on the same date received permission to wear the Crosses of the Orders of Carlos III and San Fernando of Spain, with which he was invested by Ferdinand VII of Spain for services in the Peninsula, especially at the defence of Tarifa. On 28 April 1815 he was appointed Commanding Royal Engineer of the Sussex military district. On 4 June he was made a Companion of the Order of the Bath (military division). He received the Gold Medal with clasp for Vittoria and San Sebastian. The previous pension of 100l. for his wounds at Martinique was increased to 300l. a year on 18 June 1815, as he had partially lost the sight of an eye in the Peninsula.

== Belgium and France, 1815–1818 ==
On 19 June 1815 Smith joined the British army in Belgium as Commanding Royal Engineer of the Second Corps, marched with it to Paris, and took part in the entry into that city on 7 July. He was one of the officers selected by the Duke of Wellington to take over the French fortresses to be occupied by the British. He remained with the army of occupation and commanded the Engineers at Vincennes. He was one of the officers who introduced stage-coaches-and-four into Paris. The coaches used to meet opposite Demidoff's house, afterwards the Café de Paris. He was also a boxer and an equestrian who imported English thoroughbred horses for racing. His trainer was Tom Hurst, afterwards of Chantilly. He organised successful races at Vincennes that were superior to those of royal patronage in the Champ de Mars. Smith was a reputed duellist with either rapier, or sabre, or pistol. He killed three Frenchmen in duels during his stay in Paris. He returned to England on 8 November 1818.

== West Indies, 1823–1837 ==
Smith was employed in the south of England as Commanding Royal Engineer until 1 January 1823, when he was appointed Commanding Royal Engineer in the West Indies, with headquarters at Barbados. With eleven different island colonies occupied by troops, he had only five officers of Royal Engineers under him, and was obliged to supplement his staff by making eleven officers of the line assistant engineers. A commission sent from England in 1823 to report on requirements in the West Indies recommended the addition of fourteen engineers to the establishment to enable the work to be efficacious. Smith was promoted to be lieutenant-colonel on 29 July 1825, and to be colonel in the army on 22 July 1830. He was acting Governor of Trinidad in 1828, and in 1830, and in 1831; and he was acting Governor of Demerara and of Berbice in 1833; and he was acting Governor of St. Lucia in 1834; and he was acting Governor of Gibraltar in 1838. He commanded the British forces in the West Indies from June 1836 to February 1837, for which he received the commendation of Lord Hill, the general commanding-in-chief. Smith was promoted to be colonel on 10 January 1837.

== Syria, 1840 ==
On 8 May 1837 Smith was appointed Commanding Royal Engineer of Gibraltar, where in 1838 he was acting Governor and commanded the forces. He returned to England in the summer of 1840 to go on particular service to Syria in the Second Egyptian–Ottoman War, for which duty he had been specially selected. He embarked in the Pique frigate on 9 August 1840, arriving at Beirut on 1 September. A landing was effected on 10 September, but Smith was too ill to take immediate command. He was invested, by Imperial firman dated 30 September 1840, with the command of Sultan Abdulmejid I's army in Syria, and on 9 October 1841 was given by the British government the local rank of major-general in Syria in command of the allied land forces. After the bombardment of Beirut, the city surrendered on 11 October. On 3 November Smith was involved in the assault and capture of St. Jean d'Acre, where he was severely wounded, despite which he was required to repair the fortifications, organise the defence, and administer the Pashalic of Acre.

== Later years ==
Smith returned to his command at Gibraltar in March 1841. For his services in Syria he received the thanks of both Houses of Parliament and also of the Government, through Lord Palmerston. The Ottoman Sultan Abdulmejid I presented him with the Order of Glory (Nichani Ichtatha) and Diamond Medal and Sword. He was granted one year's pay for his wound at St. Jean d'Acre. He was promoted to major-general in the army on 23 November 1841, and returned to Britain from Gibraltar on 15 May 1842, and was invested as a Knight Commander of the Bath (military division) on 27 September 1843.

On 1 June 1847 Smith received the Silver Medal, which was bestowed on surviving officers of the wars from 1806 to 1814. He had also a clasp for Martinique, and received the Naval Medal for Syria. He was employed on special service as a major-general on the staff in Ireland during the disturbances of 1848. He was promoted to be lieutenant-general on 11 November 1851, and Colonel-Commandant of the Corps of Royal Engineers on 6 March 1856. He died at Worthing, Sussex, on 11 August 1858. There is a memorial to him at St Mary's Church, Broadwater, Sussex.

== Marriages and issue ==
Smith in 1821 married a daughter of Thomas Bell of Bristol (who died at their residence in Onslow Square, London, on 18 June 1849); and in 1852 married the eldest daughter of Thomas Croft. Smith did not have issue by either marriage.

== Honours ==
=== British ===
- Knight Commander of the Order of the Bath;
- Small Gold Medal, with clasp for Vitoria and San Sebastian;
- Silver Medal, with clasp for Martinique;
- Naval Medal, for Syria;

=== Foreign ===
- Knight's Cross of the Order of Carlos III (Spain);
- Laureate Cross of the Order of San Fernando (Spain);
- Order of Glory (Ottoman Empire), and diamond medal and sword.

== Sources ==
- Napier, William Francis Patrick (1834). History of the War in the Peninsula and the South of France from the Year 1807 to the Year 1814. Vol. 4. London: John Murray. pp. 59, 60, 342.
- Vetch, R. H.; Falkner, James (2020). "Smith, Sir Charles Felix (1786–1858), army officer". Oxford Dictionary of National Biography (online ed.). Oxford University Press. doi:10.1093/ref:odnb/25785. (Subscription, Wikipedia Library access or UK public library membership required.)

Attribution:

- This article incorporates text from a publication now in the public domain: Vetch, Robert Hamilton (1898). "Smith, Charles Felix". In Lee, Sidney (ed.). Dictionary of National Biography. Vol. 53. London: Smith, Elder & Co. pp. 21–24.
