= July 1822 Spanish coup attempt =

Attempted coup d'état in Spain

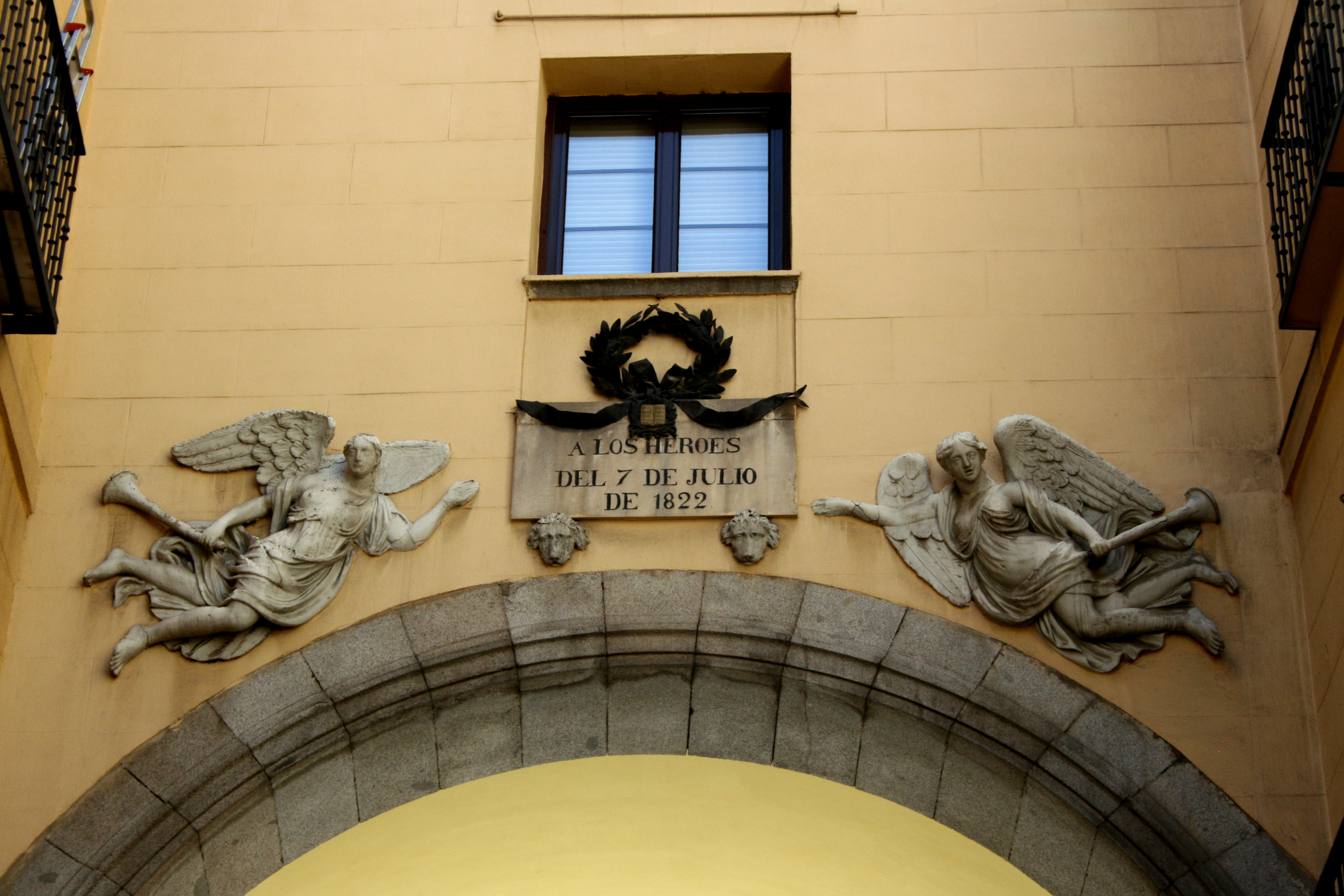
Tombstone dedicated to the heroes of the "Day of July 7" of 1822 in the arch that connects the street of 7 de julio with the Plaza Mayor of Madrid, place of the confrontation between the National Militia, stationed inside the square, and the Royal Guard rebels.

The July 1822 Spanish coup attempt, also known as the coup d'état of July 7, was a failed coup d'état that took place in Spain during the Liberal Triennium. It was intended to put an end by force to the constitutional regime, reestablished after the triumph of the Revolution of 1820, and to restore the absolute monarchy. As Juan Francisco Fuentes has pointed out, "it was the most serious attempt of absolutist coup d'état, which not in vain had its epicenter in the Royal Palace of Madrid", although it had numerous ramifications outside the capital, which demonstrates "the existence of a relatively broad and mature plan". "It marked a turning point in the course of the Triennium", stressed Ángel Bahamonde and Jesús Antonio Martínez. The same thesis is held by Pedro Rújula and Manuel Chust: "The July crisis marked in a traumatic way the evolution of the constitutional regime".

According to Emilio La Parra López, the idea of carrying out a coup d'état against the constitutional regime arose from a private interview of King Ferdinand VII with the French ambassador Count de La Garde which took place at the beginning of May 1822 and during which both agreed that it should follow the model of Napoleon's 18th Brumaire. The definitive project of the coup, according to La Parra, was devised in the entourage of Fernando VII and its specific plan was taken from the "Conspiracy of Matías Vinuesa" of the previous year. The "Confidencias", the secret network spread throughout the country of absolutist groups financed and directed from the Palace, would be in charge of its execution, and the officer of the corps Ramón Zuloaga, Count of Torrealta, would be in charge of revolting the Royal Guard. The Marquis de las Amarillas, direct witness of the events, wrote in his Memories: "The king was the soul and first motive of the insurrection". On July 4, in the middle of the coup, Ambassador La Garde communicated to his government in a coded message: "The king is completely committed and is the one who orders things" —according to La Garde, the king asked him to try to get the government to join the operation, but it failed—.

On July 1st the Royal Guard revolted and Ferdinand VII was on the point of "leaving with the rebels to lead the counterrevolution". The king consulted with the government of the moderate liberal "anillero" Francisco Martínez de la Rosa, whose members spent most of the time in the Royal Palace as virtual prisoners (and there were orders prepared for their imprisonment), and the latter advised against it because it was too risky. "The Government allowed itself to be locked up in the Palace, together with the King, because in short, what was being done was to put Vinuesa's old plan into practice", said Alberto Gil Novales. "For a whole interminable week the palace was the center of an ambitious counterrevolutionary action. Madrid became hostage to the forces of the King's Guard, and the monarch himself, with his ambiguous and silent attitude, held the Executive hostage, preventing it from taking action and leaving the initiative to the rebels", Rújula and Chust pointed out. Finally, the Royal Guard was defeated in the "Day of July 7" by the constitutional forces led by the National Militia.

== Background ==
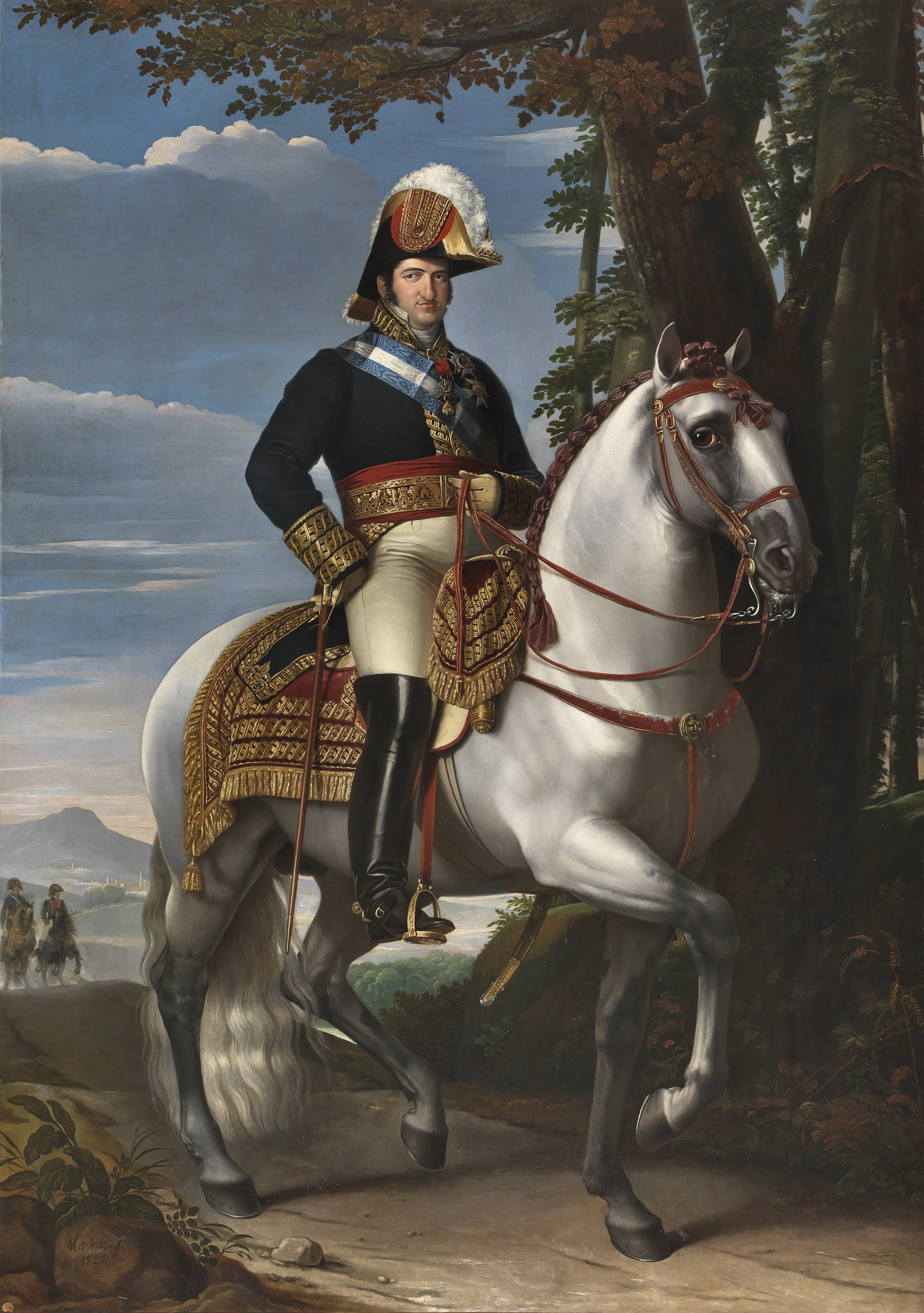
Equestrian portrait of Ferdinand VII by José de Madrazo (1821), Museo del Prado.

During the spring of 1822 the actions of the royalist parties increased notably (especially in Catalonia, Navarre, the Basque Country, Galicia, Aragon and Valencia, and more sporadically in Asturias, Old Castile, Leon, Extremadura, Murcia, Andalusia and New Castile) and there were several attempts at absolutist rebellions, the most important of which occurred in Valencia on May 30, 1822. On that date the artillerymen of the Citadel rose up in the name of the absolute king and proclaimed as Captain General of Valencia General Elío, who had already led the coup d'état of 1814 that restored absolutism and who was then in prison. The insurrection only lasted one day as the constitutionalist forces stormed the Citadel. General Elío, who probably had not participated in the conspiracy, was tried and condemned to death by garrote vil, a sentence that was carried out on September 4. "Elío paid with his life not so much for the uprising of 1822 as for the pronunciamiento of 1814 and the long repression he had exercised over the liberals", Alberto Gil Novales has pointed out. That same day, May 30, the King's name day, a crowd gathered around the Palace of Aranjuez to acclaim Ferdinand VII with shouts of "Long live the King alone!" and "Long live the absolute King!" and there were moments of tension between members of the Royal Guard, which had become one of the mainstays of the counterrevolution, and the National Militia. "The relevant thing about that day is that it did not seem to be a spontaneous movement but was almost unanimously interpreted as a planned royalist action. It was even rumored that it was a plan to proclaim the absolute king".

The following month, believing that Prince Carlos was going to lead the uprising, the Carabineers Brigade rebelled in Castro del Río, which on July 1 was to be dissolved in compliance with a decree of the Cortes of May 19. The Carabineers Brigade was, together with the Royal Guard, one of the two military corps most disaffected with the constitutional regime, since they were exponents of the Old Regime's own estamental army. Of the Royal Guard, Francisco Fernández de Córdoba said that he had a brother in it: "they lived in a state of permanent conspiracy, and they were busy... in hatching plots and forging plots to overthrow the restorers of the Constitution in a short period of time". The rebellion of the carabinieri was the prologue to the uprising of the Royal Guard and almost coincided with the capture of La Seu d'Urgell on June 21 by the royalist parties. "From that moment on, the counterrevolution had a rebellious nucleus in Spanish territory. It was one of the conditions that France had imposed to lend its support to the king. When the news reached Aranjuez, the courtiers raised their spirits and resumed conspiratorial activity with new energy". The Marquis of Miraflores wrote in his Apuntes histórico-críticos (1834) that on the eve of the "Day of July 7" "Spain [offered] the horrible spectacle of a bloody civil war".

== Coup d'état ==
=== Uprising of the Royal Guard ===
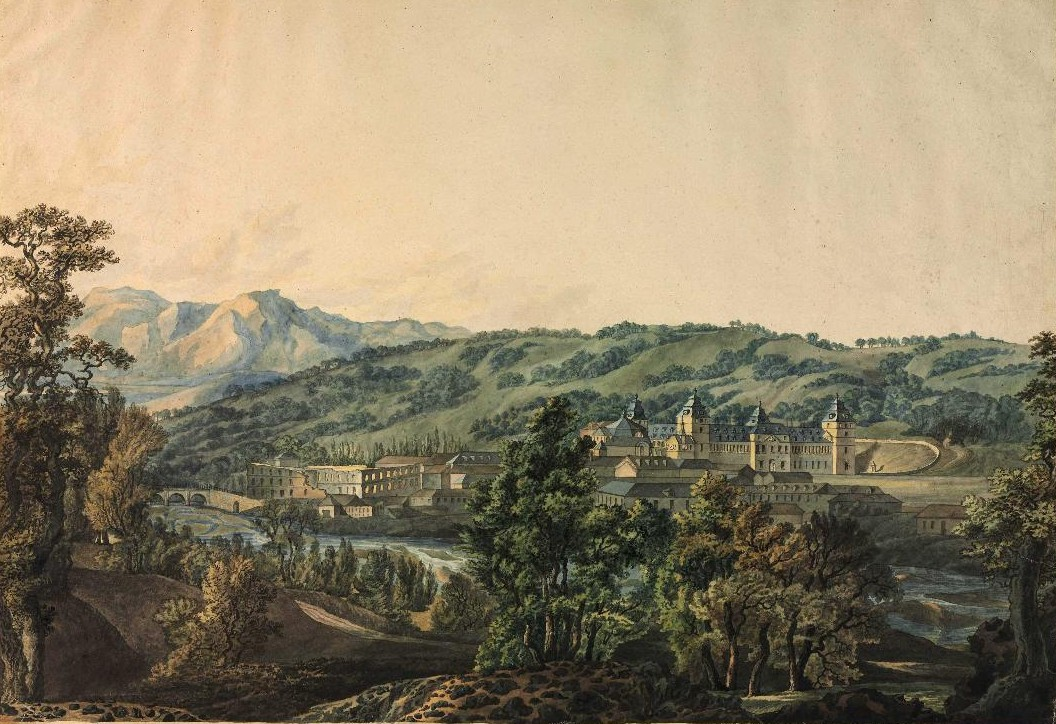
View of the mountain and palace of El Pardo where four battalions of the Royal Guard went in the early morning of July 1 to 2, initiating the coup.

On June 30, 1822, when the king returned from closing the session of the Cortes —the monarch had returned to Madrid three days earlier from Aranjuez where he had been residing since March— in the vicinity of the Royal Palace groups of civilians shouted "Long live the Constitution!" which were answered with "Long live the absolute king!" from the Royal Guard. Then an altercation took place which resulted in the death of a member of the National Militia and the liberal lieutenant of the Royal Guard Mamerto Landaburu murdered by his comrades in the courtyard of the palace (in his honor the Landaburian patriotic society would be founded). The lieutenant had confronted them, reproaching them for their behavior (they had expelled the National Militia that was in charge of the security of the area and had cordoned off the perimeter of the Palace) and their cheers in favor of the absolute king. According to the Historia de la vida y reinado de Fernando VII published in 1842, once the king arrived at the palace, the guard dislodged a guardhouse of the National Militia and the peasants who occupied the Plaza de Oriente and advanced their positions without heeding the orders of their superiors, encouraged from the balconies of the palace. In such a situation, Mamerto Landaburu, 1st lieutenant of the Royal Guard Infantry Regiment, known for his liberal ideas, tried to impose order on his subordinates, who responded with insults. The young lieutenant responded to the insubordination by wounding one of the guards with his saber and, although other comrades-in-arms tried to save him from the irritation of the wounded man's companions, taking him into the palace, he was killed by three grenadiers who shot him in the back. The news of the murder of Lieutenant Landáburu and of the defiant attitude of the Royal Guard circulated rapidly throughout Madrid.

Faced with these events, the City Council of Madrid took the initiative, which would be joined by the Permanent Deputation of Cortes, mobilizing the National Militia and demanding that the Government punish those guilty of the murders and disorders. It was also presented an exposition to the king in which it was said that Madrid was "in general alarm" and insisted on the "constant conspiracy" that had been observed "for some time against our precious liberties". On the night of July 1 to 2, four battalions of the Royal Guard, totaling some 1,500 men, left their barracks to position themselves in El Pardo —where they tore off the constitutional plaque—, while the other two remained guarding the Royal Palace. "This movement constituted the first act of an operation of assault to the constitutional order that would keep the country in suspense for seven days". In fact, it was foreseen that Fernando VII with his family would go to El Pardo to be proclaimed absolute king there, but "the king did not dare to leave Madrid or did not consider it convenient, and tried to finish everything from the palace", surrounded by aristocrats and military men of his full confidence, among whom was the Marquis of Las Amarillas.

Due to the paralysis of the political head of Madrid (and of the Government), the City Council assumed in practice all the powers and organized the resistance of the capital. The already mobilized militiamen were joined by the local garrison, commanded by General Morillo, generals who went to the City Hall —Riego, Ballesteros and Palarea— and a group of officers without a posting in Madrid who that same day, July 1, formed together with fellow countrymen the Sacred Battalion, armed by the City Hall, and which was commanded by General Evaristo San Miguel. The Marquis of Miraflores affirmed in his Apuntes histórico-críticos (1834) that Madrid "was an encampment", with its center in the Plaza de la Constitución defended by the Militia and by some artillery pieces. The newspaper El Universal wondered in its July 3 edition in reference to the Royal Guard in revolt:

But what are these illusions trying to do? What is their plan? What do they foresee as the outcome of this outrageous sedition? Do they expect that the inhabitants of the capital, its brave garrison, its valiant militia, and so many brave and determined patriots, who at this moment are with arms in hand, determined to die for the constitution, will be humbled by receiving the law from a handful of undisciplined soldiers?

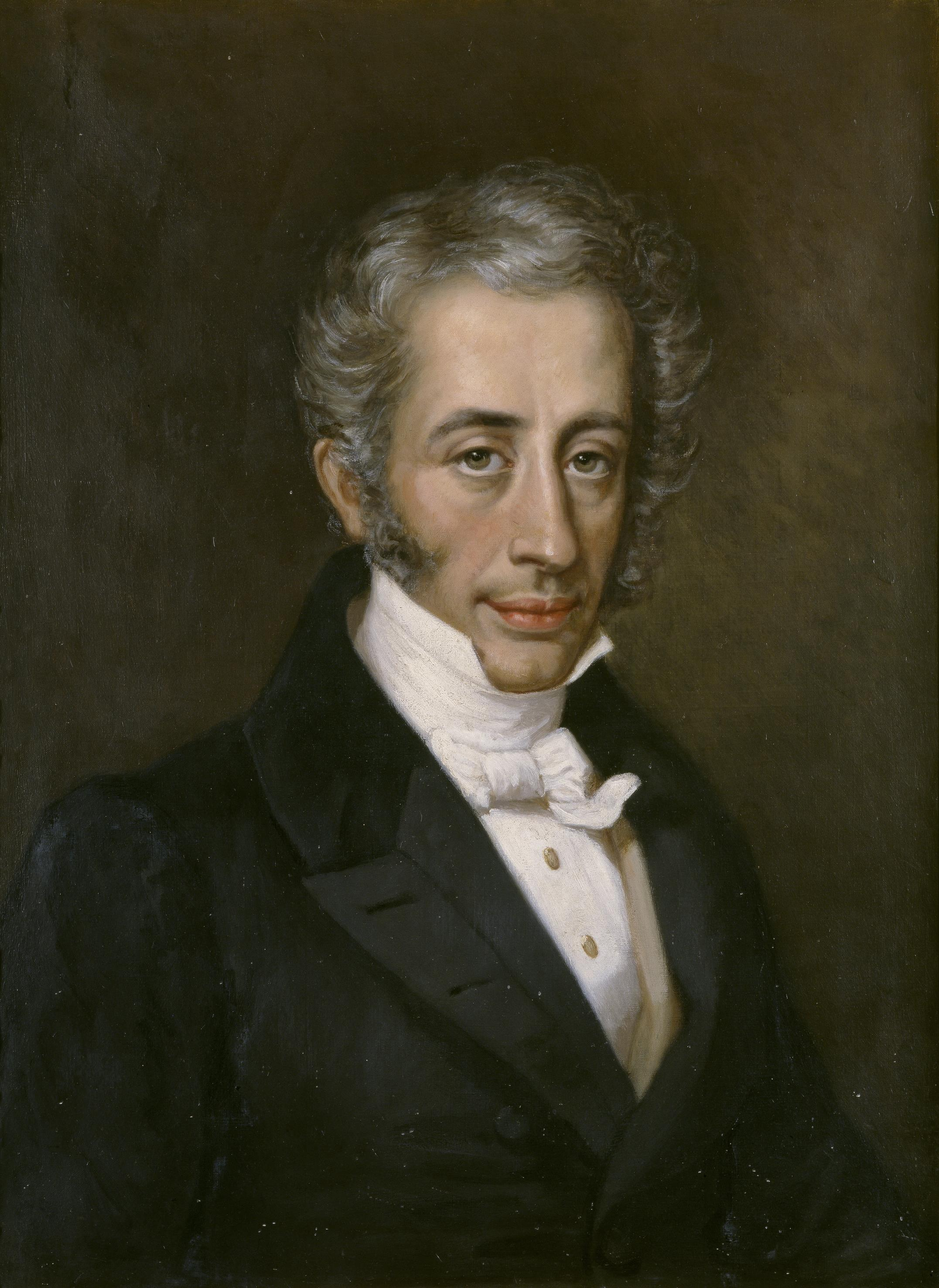
Francisco Martínez de la Rosa, leader of the Government, whose members were confined in the Royal Palace.

Following the "Vinuesa's plan", the king had called to the Palace the Government led by the moderate liberal "anillero" Francisco Martínez de la Rosa with the pretext of looking for a solution to the crisis and its members considered themselves obliged to go. As soon as they arrived, they were confined in a room of the Palace without being able to leave it —according to the French ambassador, Count de La Garde, also present in the Palace, the confinement of the ministers was due to the fact that they refused to support the coup and during their confinement they were subjected to insulting and degrading treatment by the servants—. The Government, locked up there, did not declare in rebellion the battalions of the Royal Guard that had left for El Pardo, not considering them a threat, and limited itself to ordering their transfer, without being obeyed. Nor did he second the initiatives of the City Council and the Permanent Deputation. It seemed that the Government was adopting an ambiguous position, "complicit" according to the exalted liberals (who called Martínez de la Rosa, Rosita la Pastelera), trying to take advantage of the uprising of the Royal Guard to impose its plan of Chambers (to introduce a second Chamber to "stop" the "radical" impulses of the Congress of Deputies).

Meanwhile, Ferdinand VII had sent on July 2 a letter to Louis XVIII in which he asked him to intervene: "I beg your Majesty to consider the state of my dangerous situation and my royal family so that without loss of time sufficient help may come as best it can to save us". On July 6, in an unequivocal sign of complicity with the rebels, he did not accept the resignation presented to him by the Government. Apparently in the Palace the coup plotters were debating between the "sacrifice of a part of the absolute authority enjoyed in 1814", as recommended to the king by the French ambassador La Garde (that is to say, to adopt the model of the Carta Otorgada), or the maximalist position of pure absolutism. Martínez de la Rosa was aware of these discussions (while waiting for the option of reforming the Constitution introduced by his plan of Chambers to triumph), but finally the second alternative prevailed after consulting the Council of State, which ruled that it was not possible to immediately reform the Constitution —previously Fernando VII had tried to get the Council of State to endorse the coup d'état by restoring his absolute powers prior to the revolution of 1820—. The king's decision not to accept a "temperate monarchy" was also influenced by the news that a royalist insurrection had broken out in Andalusia.

=== "Day of July 7th" ===
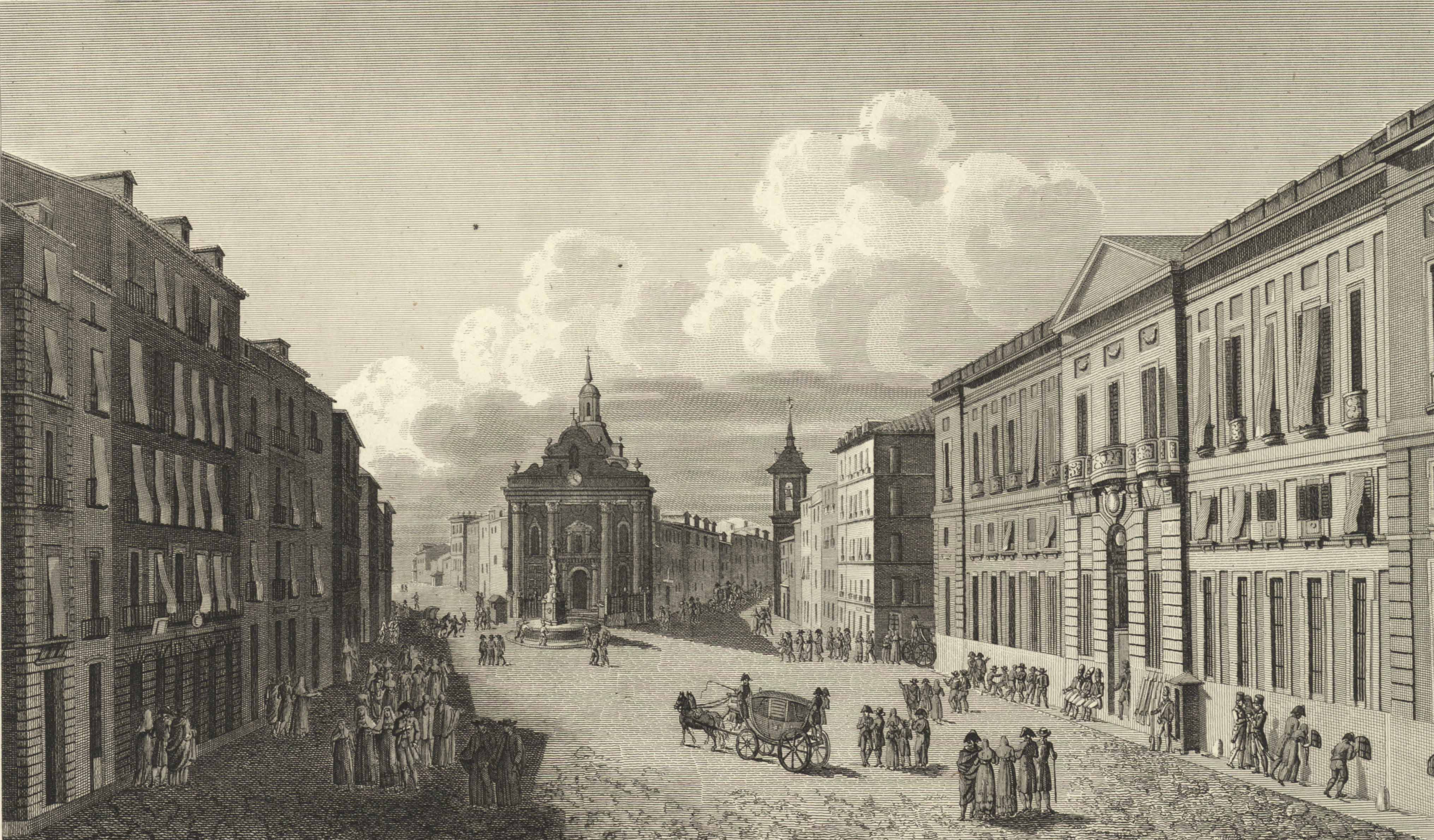
View of the Puerta del Sol in 1820. In the background the fountain and the church of Buen Suceso and to the right the Casa de Correos.

In the early morning of July 7th the four battalions of El Pardo fell silently by surprise on Madrid. They penetrated through the Portillo del Conde-Duque, dividing into three columns that headed for the Artillery Park, the Puerta del Sol and the Plaza de la Constitución, defended by the Militia. The column heading to the Artillery Park was dispersed by a detachment of the Sacred Battalion. The one in the Plaza de la Constitución was confronted by the National Militia, groups of peasants armed by the City Council and also by the Sacred Battalion. The royal guards were forced to retreat towards the Puerta del Sol, where the most intense fighting took place, and then towards the Royal Palace, where they took refuge to flee. Contrary to the hopes of the coup plotters, the action of the Royal Guard had not popular support, although money had been distributed in the poorest neighborhoods.

The king's involvement in the insurrection became even more clearly evident when, according to the memoirs of the Marquis of Las Amarillas (who witnessed the events), the officers of the Royal Guard who were preparing to flee (or surrender) "began to bid farewell to the royal family, as if they were going to certain death; the queen was convulsed and almost shaken; the king, moved; the princesses, very moved". The royal guards were pursued in their flight —to the Alcorcón markets— by the army and by militiamen. Very few managed to join the royalist parties. According to Josep Fontana, "while all these things were happening, the ministers endured, kept quiet, dissimulated. They managed, with this, to hide the complicity of the king and left things in such a way that he could begin to organize his next attempt against the constitutional regime with more success". As Pedro Rújula pointed out, "the king acted as if he had nothing to do with what had happened. He congratulated the forces of freedom, opened a case against the Guard and expelled from his side the courtiers most identified with the conspiracy.... The ministers who had been held hostage for six days were finally able to go home".

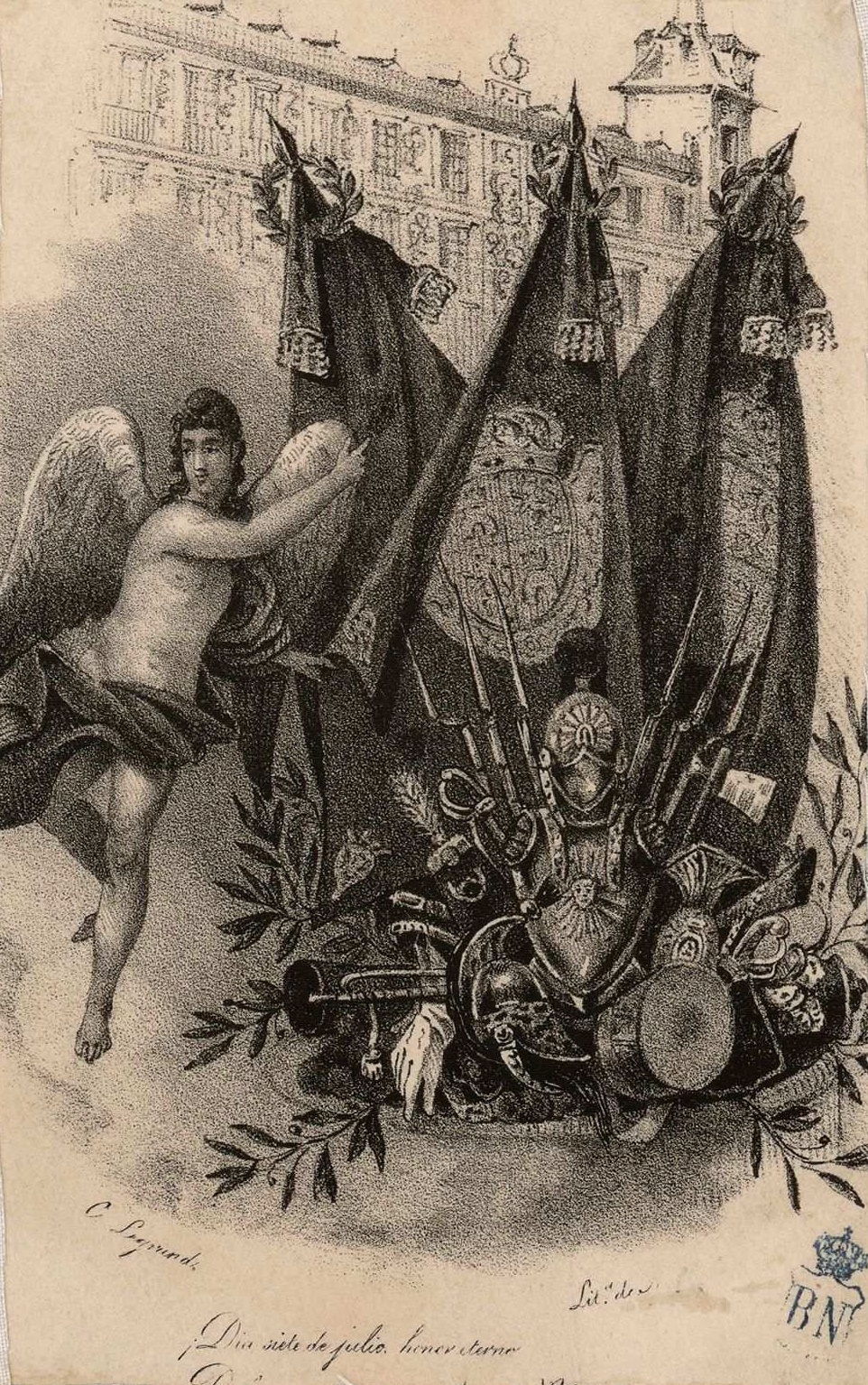
Allegory of July 7th (lithograph by Luis Carlos Legrand, National Library of Spain). The inscription reads: "Day of July 7th, eternal honor!".

Victory went to the militiamen and volunteers who managed to defeat the royal guards and the cheers to the Constitution spread throughout the capital. "July 7 became a heroic day for the memory of liberalism, through the construction of a story in virtue of which the people of Madrid had defeated absolutism and saved the Constitution", said Álvaro París Martín. The following day, El Universal published that "the anniversary of July 7, 1822 will be celebrated by our descendants" as proof that "there is no human force that can resist the will of a great people that has resolved to die or live free". The "heroic deed" was immortalized in a series of engravings of the "Memorable day of July 7, 1822". In addition, a solemn burial was held for a fallen militiaman on July 7. The coffin was "carried through the main streets scandalously surrounded by palms and laurels", according to an absolutist, until it reached the cemetery of the Puerta de Fuencarral.

This view has been assumed by several current historians. "The victory was won by the people, who had in those days, but especially on July 7, a heroic performance", Alberto Gil Novales has stressed. Juan Sisinio Pérez Garzón, quoted by Bahamonde and Martínez, has highlighted the role played by the National Militia and within it by the popular sectors. "In effect, the more open character that the militia was endowed with at the initiative of the exalted and the city council in the interpretation of the successive regulations, made that half or two thirds of each company of the second and third battalions were composed of artisans who lived on a casual and daily work", Bahamonde and Martínez have affirmed following Perez Garzon. Pérez Garzón concludes: "The constitutional forces won the battle of July 7. The protagonism was in the militia, which agglutinated in its three battalions from the proletarianized layers of the Madrid population to the aristocrats and bankers of the cavalry squadron, including middle strata such as employees and small landowners". Álvaro París Martín disagrees with this view, pointing out, first, that the "paisanaje did not have any participation" in the combats against the Royal Guard —he recognizes that "on July 7 there were armed citizen parties that fought together with the three battalions of the militia", "but none of the available sources suggests an uprising of popular character"—, and secondly, that the percentages of the participation of the day laborers and artisans in the militia estimated by Pérez Garzón were much lower —"the representation of the lower sectors of the labor universe in Madrid was limited", affirms París Martín—.

Alberto Gil Novales has also pointed out that if, in spite of the support he had ("the King and the royal family, the Government, the high hierarchies of the army and the Church, the palaces, etc.") "the insurrection failed, it was due to the lack of unity as to the aims of the rebels, since some wanted the famous plan of Chambers, that is, the introduction of a Senate to curb the possible inclination towards democracy of the Cortes, and others wanted a return to absolutism without further ado. They also acted hastily and with evident clumsiness".

== Consequences ==
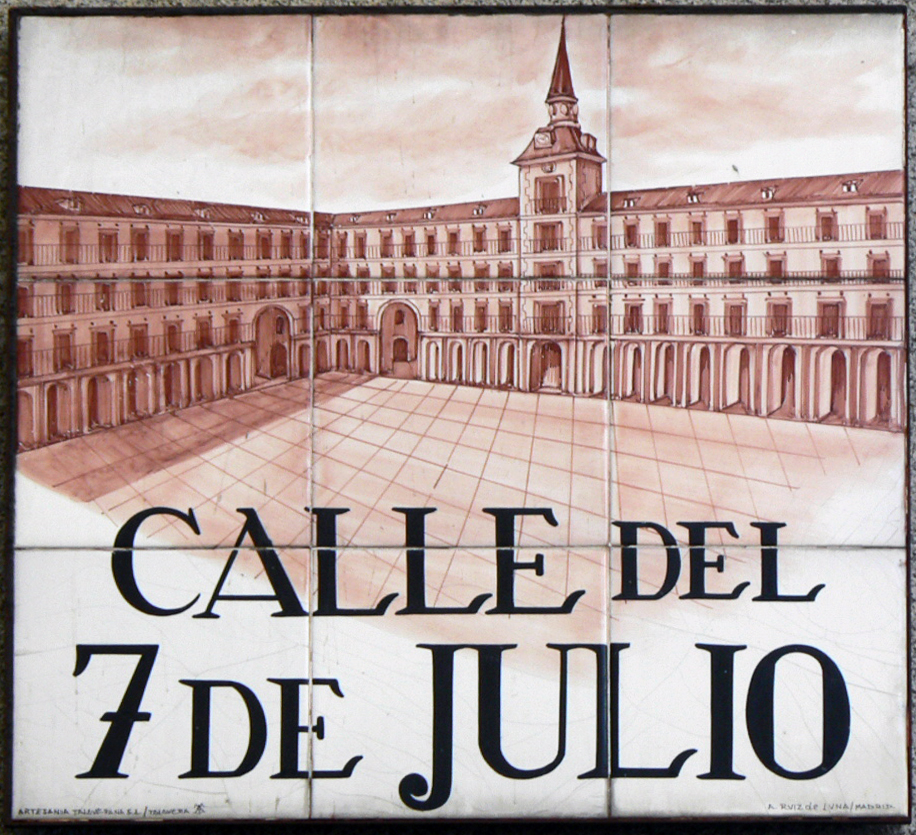
Plaque on the street of July 7 that gives access to the Plaza Mayor of Madrid, dedicated to the "July 7 Day" of 1822.

The prosecutor Juan de Paredes instructed the process, after other prosecutors had resigned to do so. He could not prosecute the King because according to the Constitution he was inviolable, although he did believe he could take his statement, but he proposed to prosecute the rest of those allegedly involved: members of the royal family, ministers, high officials of the Palace, generals,... Some fled abroad in spite of the pardon that the king granted them. Finally, on November 2, 1822, the Special Court of War and Navy took the case away from Paredes and closed it. "There will be no more responsibilities, except for a couple of wretches who will be garrotted". The king, with a high degree of cynicism, had congratulated the City Council and the Permanent Deputation for their performance during the crisis and had unloaded all responsibility on the ministers. At the beginning of the following year the Permanent Deputation approved an opinion on what had happened in which it praised the City Council of Madrid and the militia, and highlighted the weakness of the Government and its indirect complicity, as well as that of the Council of State and the political chief of Madrid, but did not directly accuse the king due to his irresponsibility and inviolability. Thus, the king and the members of his family were not incriminated and the official explanation that Ferdinand VII had been surrounded by "perfidious advisors" was imposed.

As Juan Francisco Fuentes has pointed out, "the failure of the coup d'état of July 7, 1822 marks a before and after in the history of the Liberal Triennium: after that day, power passed from the moderates to the exalted. But the change of cycle that the coup d'état of July 7 did not end with this fact. The enemies of liberalism took good note of the inability of Spanish absolutism to overthrow the constitutional regime by its own means... This analysis of the failure of the coup meant that from then on almost all the pressure on the regime came from abroad, where Spanish liberalism had old enemies". Gil Novales agrees: "for the absolutists and their more or less shameful allies, the failure of the Siete de Julio (7th of July) forced them to resort to foreign invasion". "Ferdinand VII was the first to realize this," said Emilio La Parra López, who pointed out that on July 7 the foreign ambassadors threatened the Spanish Government by means of a note in which "in the most formal manner" they warned "that the relations of Spain with the whole of Europe will depend on the conduct observed with respect to H.M.C. [His Catholic Majesty, official title of Ferdinand VII], and that the slightest outrage to the royal majesty will plunge the Peninsula into an abyss of calamities".

During the coup both the City Council of Madrid and the Permanent Deputation had addressed the King so that he would fulfill his constitutional role, even threatening him with the appointment of a Regency. Once the attempted absolutist coup d'état had failed, the two institutions again insisted that the constitutional path be followed, as well as demanding the punishment of the guilty, the purge of the Palace servants —the High Steward and the commander of the guard were dismissed— and the appointment of a new government. On July 18 the Permanent Deputation reiterated to him: "Manifest Y.M. in a firm and resolute way your decision for the constitutional system: accompany the words with works, and the tranquility and reciprocal confidence will be soon reestablished".

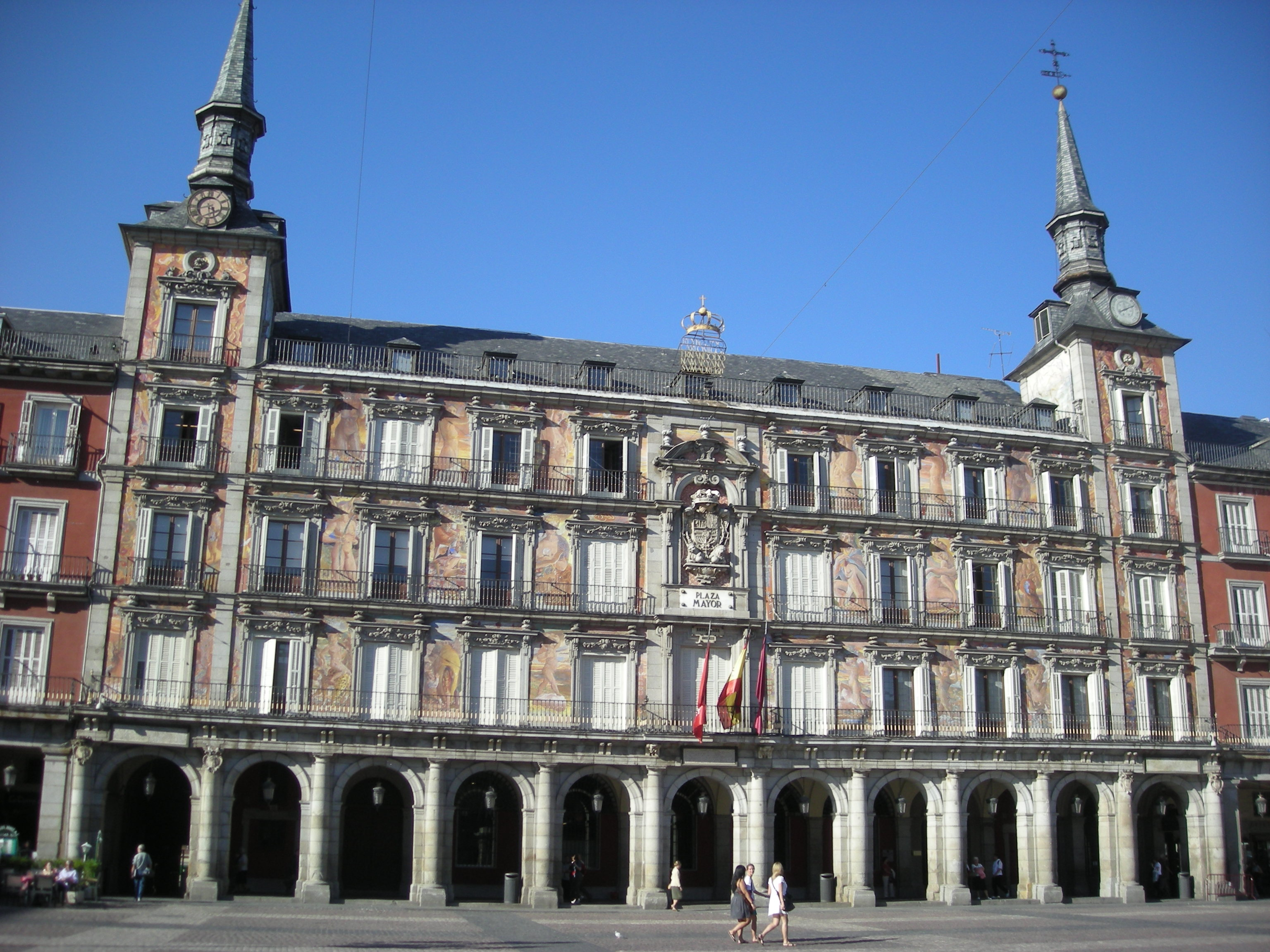
Casa de la Panadería, located on the north side of the Plaza Mayor in Madrid. From its balconies the municipal corporation, accompanied by the wounded and relatives of those who died on the Day of July 7, presided over the parade of the forces that had defeated the rebel Royal Guard.

Representation of the City Council of La Coruña to the King (July 12, 1822)

Y.M. (Your Majesty) swore and sanctioned on March 9, 20 to the face of the nation, the constitutional pact. And when the Spaniards believed that the disillusionment, the contrast with the experience of the past, would make the idolized Monarch, cautious, prudent and virtuous with his subjects, they finally see a series of machinations against the most just of all political systems, which are no longer doubt forged or are recast in a palace that should be like the ark of the testament to keep it intact and inviolable. Thousands of diverse schemes have been seen, and a thousand times the peoples have kept silent to avoid the scandal of the nations. Finally, your Royal Guard has completely lifted the veil: the most horrendous attack has just been committed by your Royal Person against the indisputable and imprescriptible rights of the nation. [...] And this troop, the Royal Guard is the same that is used to declare civil war and proclaim despotism, and to put an end to the remains of this wretched nation that has suffered so much for love of your Majesty and for your unexpected ingratitude! [...] Sir: Will there be room for the dissolution of the social pact between Your Majesty and the Nation? Will Your Majesty want to see the horrifying picture of civil war? The Spaniards detest it, but they fear nothing: humanity and glory are their motto, and the hero dies sweetly on the field of honor fighting for the rights of the human race, for the peace that God has recommended so much to those whom he has created in his divine likeness.

May God keep you in your greatest greatness. Coruña, its Constitutional City Council, July 12, 1822.

Juan Francisco Varela, 1st Mayor (and fifteen more signatures).

As the moderate liberals were completely discredited by the ambiguous attitude that, at least the "anilleros", maintained during the coup d'état, the king was forced to appoint on August 5 a cabinet made up of exalted liberals whose strong man was General Evaristo San Miguel, one of the heroes of July 7, who occupied the Secretariat of the Office of State. One of its members was General Miguel López de Baños, who, like San Miguel, had participated in Riego's pronunciamiento. The rest of the Secretaries of the Office were Mariano Egea, in the Treasury; Felipe Navarro, in Grace and Justice; Dionisio Capaz, in the Navy; José Fernández Gascó, in the Interior; and José Manuel Vadillo, in Overseas.

On September 24, the commemorative acts of the "Day of July 7" were celebrated in Madrid with a parade in which all the forces that had defeated the rebel Royal Guard took part. During the military meal that followed, the new political chief Juan Palarea gave a speech in homage "to those who defended their freedom in the squares and streets of this capital". Then the "heroes of July 7", including the Neapolitan general Guglielmo Pepe, were carried on shoulders amidst cheers and the music of Riego's Hymn. The celebration ended in the evening at the theater, where the political play Coletilla en Navarra was performed. At the end of the performance, the popular celebration continued in the Plaza de la Constitución with three bands playing from the balconies of the Casa de la Panadería and the buildings across the street.

== See also ==
- Trienio liberal

== Bibliography ==
- Arnabat, Ramon (2020). "La contrarrevolución y la antirrevolución". El Trienio Liberal (1820-1823). Una mirada política (in Spanish) (Pedro Rújula and Ivana Frasquet ed.). Granada: Comares. pp. 285–307. ISBN 978-84-9045-976-8.
- Bahamonde, Ángel; Martínez, Jesús Antonio (2011) [1994]. Historia de España. Siglo XIX (in Spanish) (6th ed.). Madrid: Cátedra. ISBN 978-84-376-1049-8.
- Fontana, Josep (1979). La crisis del Antiguo Régimen, 1808-1833 (in Spanish). Barcelona: Crítica. ISBN 84-7423-084-5.
- Fuentes, Juan Francisco (2007). El fin del Antiguo Régimen (1808-1868). Política y sociedad (in Spanish). Madrid: Síntesis. ISBN 978-84-975651-5-8.
- Gil Novales, Alberto (2020) [1980]. El Trienio Liberal (in Spanish). Preliminary study and edition by Ramon Arnabat. Zaragoza: Prensas de la Universidad de Zaragoza. ISBN 978-84-1340-071-6.
- La Parra López, Emilio (2018). Fernando VII. Un rey deseado y detestado. XXX Premio Comillas de Historia, Biografía y Memorias (Comillas Prize for History, Biography and Memoirs). Barcelona: Tusquets. ISBN 978-84-9066-512-1.
- Orobon, Marie-Angèle; Fuentes, Juan Francisco (2020). "La calle". El Trienio Liberal (1820-1823). Una mirada política (in Spanish) (Pedro Rújula and Ivana Frasquet ed.). Granada: Comares. pp. 379–401. ISBN 978-84-9045-976-8.
- París Martín, Álvaro (2020). "Milicia Nacional". El Trienio Liberal (1820-1823). Una mirada política (in Spanish) (Pedro Rújula and Ivana Frasquet ed.). Granada: Comares. pp. 213–237. ISBN 978-84-9045-976-8.
- Rújula, Pedro (2020). "El Rey". El Trienio Liberal (1820-1823). Una mirada política (in Spanish) (Pedro Rújula and Ivana Frasquet ed.). Granada: Comares. pp. 3–38. ISBN 978-84-9045-976-8.
- Rújula, Pedro; Chust, Manuel (2020). El Trienio Liberal en la monarquía hispánica. Revolución e independencia (1820-1823) (in Spanish). Madrid: Los Libros de la Catarata. ISBN 978-84-9097-937-2.
- Sánchez Martín, Víctor (2020). "El ejército". El Trienio Liberal (1820-1823). Una mirada política (in Spanish) (Pedro Rújula and Ivana Frasquet ed.). Granada: Comares. pp. 131–153. ISBN 978-84-9045-976-8.
