= Burn Hall (disambiguation) =

Burn Hall may refer to:

- Army Burn Hall College, a Pakistan Army-administered school and college in Abbottabad, Pakistan, formerly known as "Burn Hall School"
- Burn Hall, County Durham, a country house in County Durham, England
- Burn Hall School, a missionary school in Srinagar, Kashmir
