= Siege of Tarifa (1812) =

1811–1812 siege during the Peninsular War

- Part of the Peninsular War
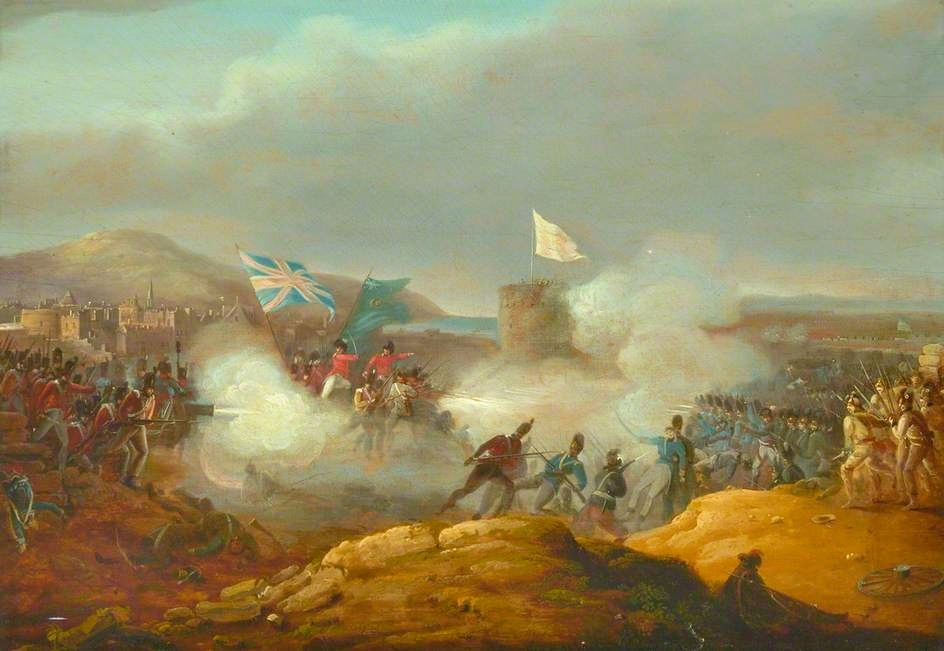
- Royal Irish Fusiliers repel a French assault
| Date | 19 December 1811 – 5 January 1812 |
| Location | Tarifa, Spain 36.014°N 5.606°W |
| Result | Coalition victory |

Belligerents
| (First French Empire) French Empire; Duchy of Warsaw | Spain; (United Kingdom of Great Britain and Ireland) United Kingdom |

Commanders and leaders
| (First French Empire) Jean François Leval | Francisco Copons (United Kingdom of Great Britain and Ireland) John Byrne Skerrett |

Strength
| 8,000–10,400; 16 guns | 2,300–4,500; 26 guns |

Casualties and losses
| 600–680 killed, wounded or captured 9–14 guns lost | 68–150 killed, wounded or captured |

Peninsular War: Siege of Cádiz
current battle

In the siege of Tarifa from 19 December 1811 to 5 January 1812, an Imperial French army under Jean François Leval laid siege to an Anglo-Spanish garrison led by Francisco Copons. Despite the advice of British Colonel John Byrne Skerrett to evacuate the town, Copons decided to hold out. Some wanted to evacuate to and defend the small island that was attached by a causeway from the town.

Tarifa is located on the southernmost tip of Spain, about 65 miles (105 km) southeast of Cádiz. The siege occurred during the Peninsular War, part of the Napoleonic Wars.

== Troops ==
General of Division Jean François Leval commanded a corps of 15,000 soldiers, with 8,000 present with 16 siege guns. His French troops included three battalions of the 16th Light Infantry Regiment, two battalions each of the 43rd, 51st, 54th, 63rd, 94th, and 95th Line Infantry Regiments, and one battalion each of the 27th Light and 8th Line Infantry Regiments. Leval's Polish contingent was made up of two battalions each of the 7th and 9th Infantry Regiments and his cavalry comprised four squadrons each of the 16th and 21st Dragoon Regiments.

General Francisco Copons led the defenders, who numbered under 3,000 men and 26 guns. His Spanish brigade included one battalion each of the Irlanda and Cantabria Infantry Regiments, one company of Cazadores (sharpshooters), 120 gunners, and 25 cavalrymen. Colonel John Byrne Skerrett's British brigade consisted of the 2nd Battalion of the 47th Foot, 1st Battalion of the 82nd Foot, 2nd Battalion of the 87th Foot, the flank companies of the 1st Battalion of the 11th Foot, one company of the 95th Rifles, one-half squadron of the 2nd King's German Legion Hussar Regiment, and one foot artillery battery.

== Siege ==
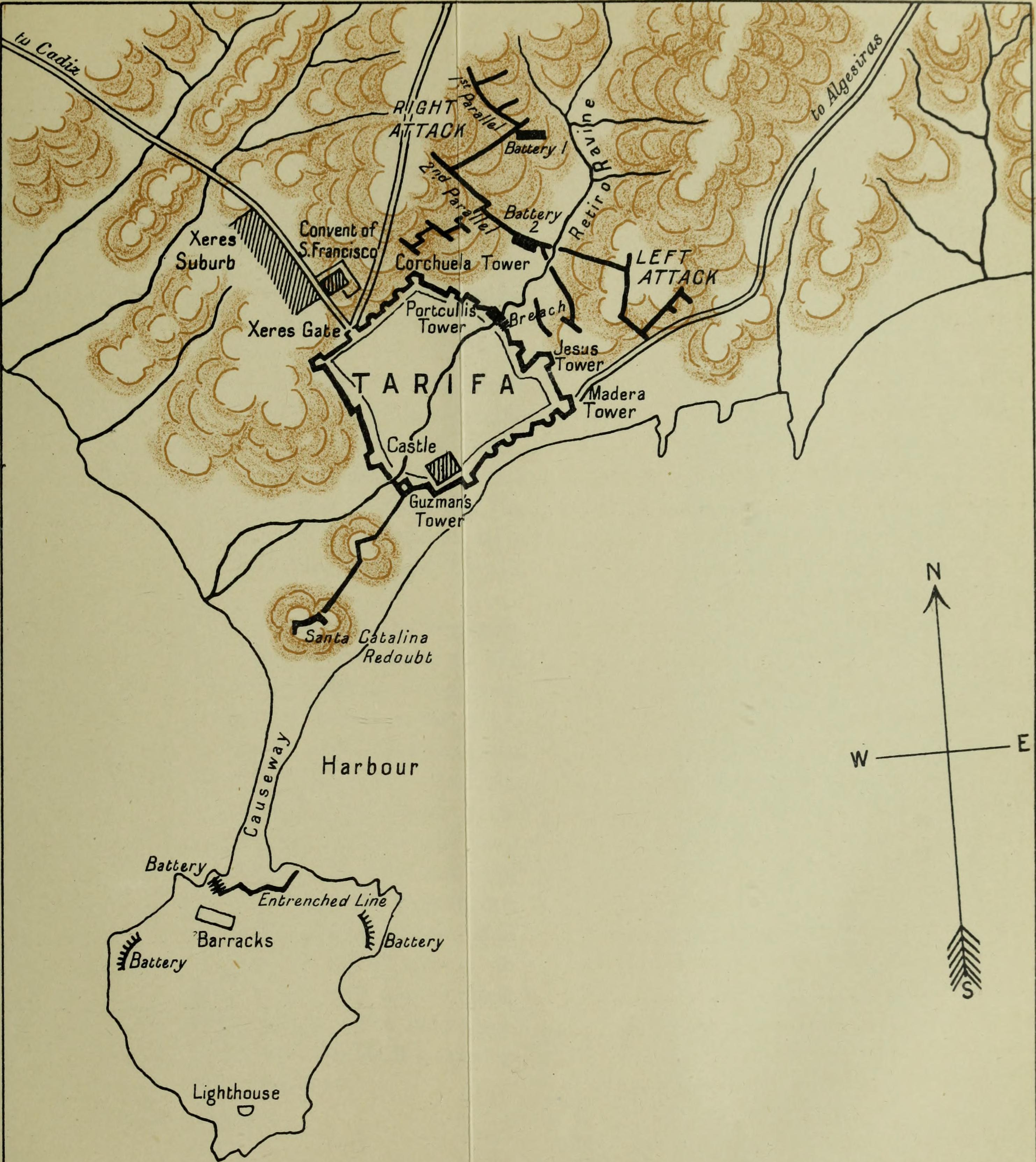
A map of Tarifa and the surrounding area during the siege

The French drove the advanced posts of the garrison in on 19 December and surveyed the town to decide on their point of attack. Seeing the apparent advantage of the high ground to the east, they opened trenches on 22 December and by dawn on 29 December were ready to fire their sixteen-pounder cannon. It only took a few hours for the walls to tumble down and to make a large breach.

The small walled town of Tarifa seemed almost impossible to defend. Overlooked at short range by higher ground, with walls unprotected against artillery fire, it would easily fall to a serious attack. Skerrett proposed abandoning the defence and embarking on ships. Captain C. F. Smith of the Corps of Royal Engineers strongly opposed the idea; he had noted that inside the walls, the ground level was much lower which combined with a deep narrow river that flowed through the town would make that assault quite hazardous. Skerrett was checkmated when the ships were ordered back to Gibraltar, the commanders being forbidden to embark a single soldier, by General Campbell, the Governor of Gibraltar.

Smith having foreseen where the French would attack had prepared internal defences against the impending assault. The 14-foot sheer drop inside the wall would trap the French from retreating and every house overlooking the area was loopholed and garrisoned, with retrenchments formed to trap the enemy. All debris was cleared from inside the wall, despite the grape being fired by the besiegers.

Surrender terms were offered and refused.

The night of 29/30 December had very heavy rain, with the portcullis defending the river entrance bent inwards by the flood of water and the defences requiring quick repairs before the French attacked at dawn.

French Grenadiers advanced along the now dry river bed trying to enter through the portcullis, however it held and the 87th Regiment blunted their attack with withering fire. Moving to their left they tried for the breach, and meeting more fire, retreating back to the river bed, which was covered by a cannon mounted on a tower, firing grape, they huddled amongst their dead and wounded until they eventually retreated back to their camp.

This was the only attack that was made, the weather became extremely inclement for several days, the torrential rain damaging the French batteries and trenches so that on the night of 4 January 1812, they were heard pulling back. Going over to the offensive, the Allies sallied forth in the morning, forcing the French to retreat, leaving their siege equipment behind.

== Aftermath ==
General Leval withdrew after making his one abortive assault and seeing sickness begin to ravage his soldiers. Unable to extract their heavy siege artillery from the mud, the besiegers destroyed and abandoned most of their cannons.

Napier wrote "Tarifa was worth the efforts made in its defence and aside from the courage and devotion of the troops, without which nothing could have been effected, the merit chiefly appertains to Charles Smith, the Captain of Engineers... to the British Engineer, therefore belongs the praise of this splendid action."

Captain Smith went on to take part in many more conflicts over the next 30 years. He became a lieutenant general and was knighted.

General Copons went on to fight many more battles alongside the British, his shining star failing on the return to Spain of King Fernando VII.

The French did not return to Tarifa and their siege of Cádiz was abandoned in August 1812, whereafter, over the next year, the French would gradually retreat all the way back to France.

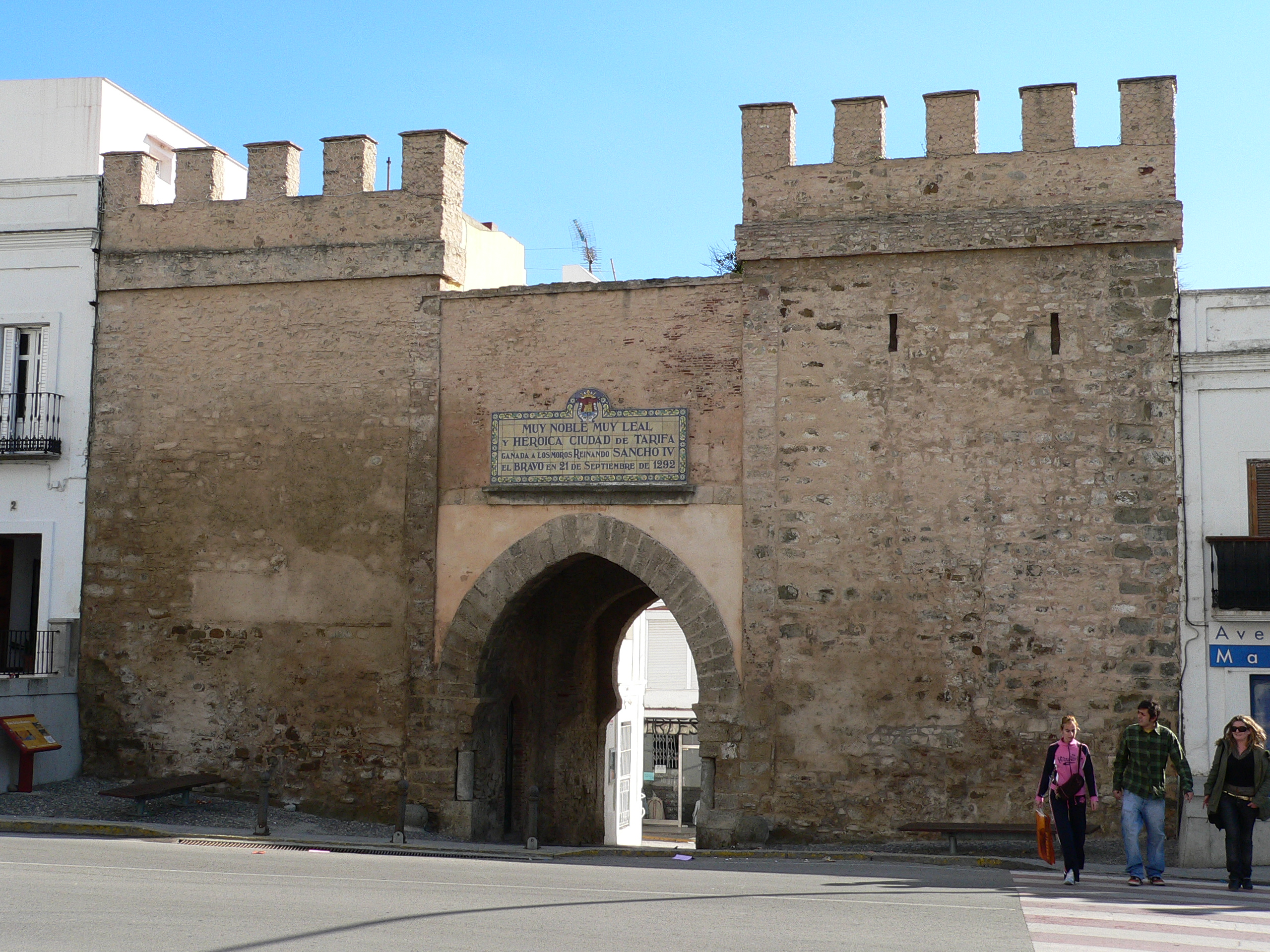
Puerta de Jerez, a Tarifa city gate from the Middle Ages
