= Francisco Copons y Navia =

Spanish soldier

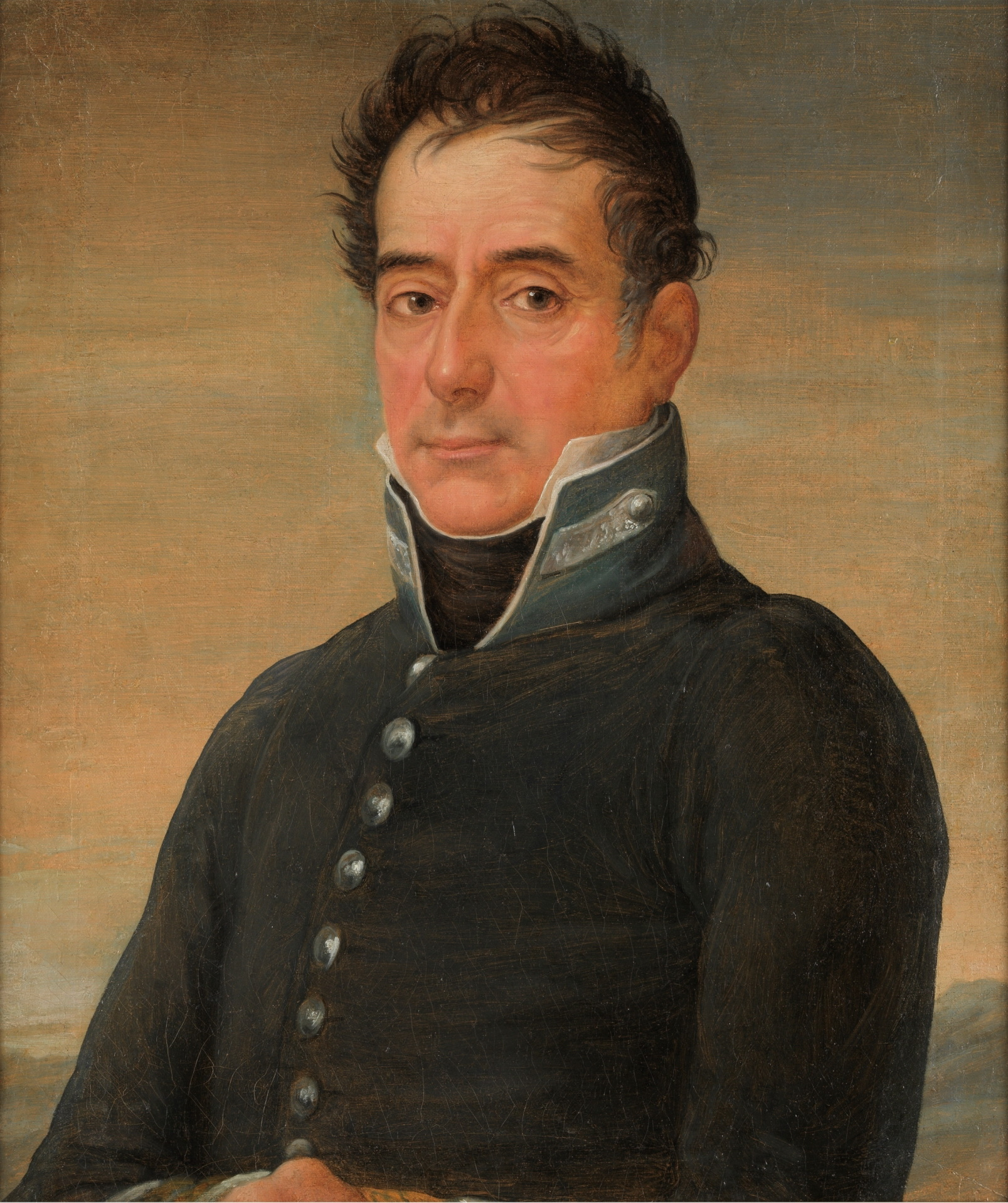
- Francisco Copons y Navia (c. 1815). Portrait by José Aparicio, Prado Museum
- Born: 21 July 1764; Málaga, Spain
- Died: 18 September 1842 (aged 78); Madrid, Spain
- Military career
- Branch: Infantry
- Rank: Lieutenant general
- Conflicts: War of the Pyrenees; Peninsular War

Francisco Copons y Navia, 1st Count of Tarifa (21 July 1764 – 18 September 1842) was a Spanish soldier, active during the War of the Pyrenees and the Peninsular War. He was appointed captain general of Catalonia in 1812 and promoted to lieutenant general in 1814.

== Military career ==
=== War of the Pyrenees ===
After graduating from the Military Academy at Puerto de Santa María, Copons served as a lieutenant in the Infantry during the first War of the Pyrenees, in which he distinguished himself in several actions and was promoted to captain, at the proposal of General Antonio Ricardos. He later again distinguished himself, this time under the orders of the Count de la Unión, who promoted him to Regimental Sergeant Major.

Following the death, in battle, of the Count, Copons once again distinguished himself at the head of the Tercios de Migueletes de Olot y Camprodón.

He took part in the occupation of French Cerdagne under General Cuesta, where he was seriously wounded and rewarded for his action by being promoted to lieutenant colonel.

He was promoted to colonel in December 1807.

=== Peninsular War ===
Copons was in Madrid on 2 May 1808 and he left the next day to join his regiment at Tarifa.

General Castaños gave him the command of the Batallón de Tiradores de España, with which he fought at the Battle of Bailén as a major of the 2nd Division under Marquis de Coupigny.

He accompanied the Army of Andalusia in its march towards the Ebro Valley, deploying his battalion in the vanguard and entering Navarre, distinguishing himself at Lerín on 13 October 1808.

At the Battle of Tudela, Copons's battalion covered General Castaños's retreat and went on to fight at Tarancón and at Uclés.

In February 1809, Copons was appointed Colonel of the Murcia Infantry Regiment, made up of the units defeated at Uclés.

At the Battle of Talavera, Copons once again distinguished himself and was promoted to brigadier in August 1809.

Serving initially under Eguía, Copons was given command of the 7th Infantry Division at Ocaña, under Areizaga, where the Spanish army was routed by Marshal Soult.

Making his way down to Cádiz, Copons and the remainder of his division were incorporated under the Duke of Alburquerque's command, and Copons was appointed commander of the troops stationed at Cádiz.

He was appointed field marshal in February 1810 when the Regency gave him the command of all the dispersed troops in the county of Niebla (fewer than 600 men) and within a year he had been able to build up an Infantry division of 2,900 soldiers, a 735-strong Cavalry regiment and a company of Artillery comprising four guns and 82 artillerymen, with which he was able to attack the French troops besieging Cádiz as well as the troops under the Duke of Arenberg in Huelva.

Copons was appointed Captain general of Catalonia in December 1812. In February 1813 he was promoted to lieutenant general and, later that year, led his troops to victory at La Bisbal (May 1813).

Having signed the Treaty of Valençay with France, Fernando VII of Spain sent his favourite, Duke of San Carlos who had followed Ferdinand into exile, as well as having drawn up the treaty and would go on to be become Secretary of State (Prime Minister of Spain) following the Absolutist Restauration, to meet Copons at the latter's headquarters. Among other demands, Copons insisted the King promise to uphold the 1812 Constitution and to separate the Ferdinand from all those who had counselled him to go to Bayonne. These demands earned Copons the enmity of Escoiquiz and all the other members of the King's court.

On 24 March 1814, still as Captain general of Catalonia, and accompanied by his second-in-command, Baron de Eroles, Copons received Fernando VII on the banks of the Fluviá on the King's return to Spain from his captivity in France.

=== Post-war career ===
On 4 June, shortly after the war was over (Treaty of Paris, 30 May 1814), Copons received the decree signed by the King by which he reneged on the Constitution and that same day, San Carlos informed Copons that, by order of the King, he was to travel to Madrid.

However, that night, Eroles detained Copons, by order of the King confining him at Siguenza, pending criminal trial, where he was held until early April 1816, when he was allowed to continue to Madrid.

In May 1818, Copons was appointed second in command to the military and civil governor of Barcelona Castaños. In March 1820, following the outbreak of the military uprising in January 1820 by Rafael de Riego against the absolutist rule of Ferdinand VII, both were relieved of their commands for refusing to enact the Constitution. Copons was held in detention at the Miraflores Charterhouse, in Burgos, before being expelled from Barcelona.

He held several posts during the Trienio Liberal. In January 1821, he was appointed member of the Board of Advisors at the Ministry of War. Later that year, while he was jefe politico of the province of Madrid, he was dismissed from the post by Ramón Feliú, the minister of the interior, for having refused to close down the Fontana de Oro, a café de tertulia in Madrid, closure which was carried out immediately by the new jefe politico, José Martínez San Martín, who also arrested the Fontana's owner, Juan Antonio Gippini, on the pretext that the speakers there were doing so only with the authorisation of his predecessor (Copons). The case against Gippini was dismissed.

In August 1822, Copons was appointed Captain general of New Castile, but he resigned less than a month later.
