= Evaristo Fernández de San Miguel =

Spanish general and politician (1785–1862)

Evaristo Fernández de San Miguel, duque de San Miguel
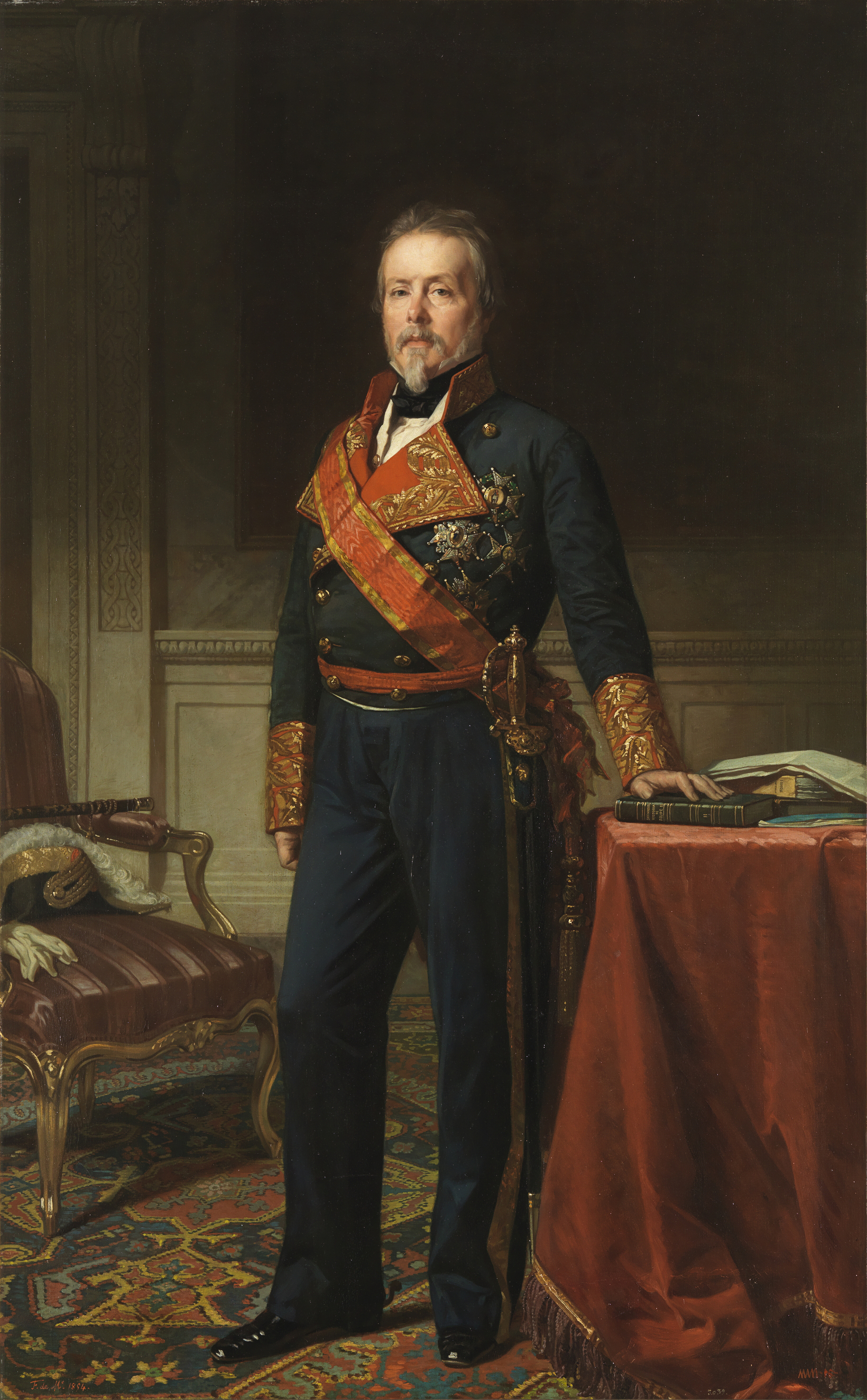
- Evaristo Fernández de San Miguel, duque de San Miguel, 1854. Federico Madrazo (Museo del Prado, Madrid)
- Born: 26 October 1785; Gijón (Asturias), Spain
- Died: 29 May 1862 (aged 76) Madrid, Spain
- Branch: Spanish Army
- Rank: Captain general
- Conflicts: Peninsular War

Evaristo José Fernández San Miguel y Valledor, Duke of San Miguel (26 October 1785–29 May 1862) was a Spanish soldier, politician and writer.

He was a deputy in the Cortes Generales in the legislatures of 1841, 1846, 1854-1856. He was named Senator for life in 1851 and Captain General in 1856.

== Military career ==
After having studied Mathematics at the Real Instituto Asturiano in Gijón, and Humanities at Oviedo University, San Miguel joined the Army as a cadet in May 1805 in the Regimiento Primero de Voluntarios de Aragón, together with his brother Santos, who would later be promoted to lieutenant general. At the start of the Peninsular War, San Miguel was a sub-lieutenant in the Regimiento de Voluntarios del Estado, charged with holding the red de San Luis in Madrid, post he was forced to abandon when attacked by superior French forces.

He returned to Asturias to join the defensive plans of the historic General Junta of the Principality of Asturias.

Taken prisoner after the defeat at Peña del Castillo (Santander) in July 1809, he was sent France, where he was held until the signing of the Treaty of Valençay (1813).

Back in Spain, he joined the Regimiento Asturias, part of the expeditionary force, the Ejército Expedicionario de Ultramar, which had been quartered at Cádiz since 1816 in preparation for being sent over to America to quell the remaining rebellions.

A mason, going under the name "Patria", in July 1819, San Miguel, now a lieutenant colonel and active in a regiment that was especially noteworthy for supporting the revolutionary winds blowing across Spain, was arrested, together with other fellow officers, including Antonio Quiroga, Felipe del Arco-Agüero, Demetrio O'Daly and Antoine de Roten. He was held prisoner, along with his brother Santos and Arco Agüero, at the Castle of San Sebastián, in Cádiz, from which they managed to escape the following January, a week after Rafael del Riego had announced his pronunciamiento. Quiroga, chosen by his fellow officers as head of the revolutionary movement, organized his forces in San Fernando where, faced by the Royalist troops led by José O’Donnell, decided to resist in San Fernando, while the Columna Móvil, under the direct command of Riego, would deploy itself throughout Andalusia to garner support for the revolution, at the same time acting as a rearguard, if necessary. San Miguel was named commander-in-chief of this Column Móvil.

During the Trienio Liberal, he was an active member of the tertulias held at The Fontana de Oro, in Madrid, one of several cafés de tertulia that were used as meeting places in Spain for the sociedades patrióticas (patriotic societies).

In July 1822, when four battalions of Guardias Reales tried to overthrow the liberal government by attacking Madrid, San Miguel, at the head of the so-called Batallón Sagrado, which included leading figures, such as Ramón Narváez, Bravo Murillo, and Fermín Arteta, went to the Council of Madrid requesting arms to be distributed for defending Madrid.

He joined Francisco Espoz y Mina's forces in Catalonia, and fought at the Battle of Tramaced on 8 October 1823, where he was wounded and taken prisoner. Thanks to the mediation of the French Marshal Lauriston, he was taken to Agen. In May 1824, he was released on condition that he left the country and he went to London.

He returned to France in 1830 but failed in his attempt to enter Spain, finally being able to do so in May 1834.

He was promoted to brigadier in July 1836 after participating at the Battle of Mendigorría, where he was wounded and for which he was awarded the Laureate Cross of Saint Ferdinand.

As General-in-chief of the Ejército del Centro, he prepared the attack on the Carlist forces based at Cantavieja y Beceite (Teruel).

== Journalism and writings ==
San Miguel was a prolific writer, publishing several works, as well as writing the lyrics to the Himno de Riego, in honour of Rafael del Riego, which was declared the national anthem of Spain in 1822, remaining so until the overthrow of the liberal government the following year and would also become one of the popular anthems used in the First Spanish Republic (1873–1874) and, with even more prominence, during the Second Spanish Republic (1931–1939).

While at San Fernando, together with Alcalá Galiano, he drew up La Gaceta Patriótica del Ejército Nacional. He was also responsible for the proclamations, signed by Quiroga, that Riego made public following the pronunciamiento.

In 1821, he founded El Espectador (15 April 1821 – 31 March 1823), an important liberal newspaper in its day.

While exiled in London, he collaborated with newspapers and published Elementos del arte de la guerra (London, 1826).
