= Jean François Leval =

- Born: 18 April 1762; Paris, France
- Died: 7 August 1834 (aged 72)
- Allegiance: France
- Branch: Infantry
- Rank: General of Division
- Conflicts: American Revolutionary War; Battle of Pensacola; French Revolutionary Wars; Battle of Fleurus; Battle of Ostrach; Battle of Stockach; Napoleonic Wars; Battle of Jena; Battle of Lübeck; Battle of Eylau; Battle of Zornoza; Battle of Medellín; Battle of Talavera; Battle of Ocaña; Battle of Barrosa; Siege of Tarifa; Battle of Vitoria; Battle of the Nive
- Awards: Légion d'Honneur, 1808
- Other work: Baron of the Empire, 1809

Jean François, baron Leval (French pronunciation: [ʒɑ̃ fʁɑ̃swa ləval]; 18 April 1762 – 7 August 1834) was promoted to general officer during the French Revolutionary Wars and led a division in a number of battles during the Napoleonic Wars.

He rapidly rose in rank during the French Revolution. Appointed to command a demi-brigade beginning early in 1793, by the end of the year he was a general of brigade. He led a brigade at Fleurus in 1794 and in the campaign of 1795. In 1799 he became a general of division. He commanded a division in Napoleon Bonaparte's Grand Army at the battles of Jena and Eylau. Later he transferred to Spain where he fought in numerous actions including Talavera, Ocaña, Barossa, Vitoria, and the Nive. The only action in which he commanded an army was the Siege of Tarifa, which was a failure. In 1814, he led his division in eastern France.

His surname is one of the names inscribed under the Arc de Triomphe, on Column 7.

== Bibliography ==
- Broughton, Tony. "Generals Who Served in the French Army during the Period 1792-1814: Lemaire to Lynch". The Napoleon Series.
- Chandler, David G. (1966). The Campaigns of Napoleon. New York, NY: Macmillan.
- Gates, David (2002). The Spanish Ulcer: A History of the Peninsular War. London: Pimlico.
- Smith, Digby (1998). The Napoleonic Wars Data Book. London: Greenhill.
