= La Fontana de Oro (inn) =

La Fontana de Oro (The Golden Fountain) was an inn and coffee house, known as a café de tertulia, located in Carrera de San Jerónimo, in Madrid. (Note: Carrera de San Jerónimo is a street which extends out from Puerta del Sol, in the centre of the city, past the Palacio de las Cortes, seat of Spain's Congress of Deputies, towards the Church of Saint Jerome the Royal, from which the street takes its name.)

The Fontana de Oro was one of several cafés de tertulia that were used as meeting places in Spain for the sociedades patrióticas (patriotic societies), clubs at which liberal politics were open to discussion during the Trienio Liberal for the Exaltados ('Fanatics' or 'Extremists', in the sense of 'radicals'), the label given to the most left-wing or progressive political current of liberalism in nineteenth-century Spain, associated with, and at times inspired by, French Jacobinism and republicanism. (Note: Although the Spanish historian Alberto Gil Novales (1975, i: 11) disagreed with that version of the societies: "It would be better to avoid considering them centres of unanimous Jacobinism and republicanism, as their enemies did" (Dorca, 2014: p. 237).)

Its members included Evaristo Fernández de San Miguel, Francisco Martínez de la Rosa, Antonio Alcalá Galiano, and Duke del Parque, who became its chairman.

In Anecdotes of the Spanish and Portuguese Revolutions (1823), Italian politician and historian Count Giuseppe Pecchio (1785–1835), one of the proscritti in exile from Charles Felix's rule in Sardinia, and writing from Spain, describes the Fontana de Oro as "... nothing more than a large room on the ground floor, capable of containing nearly a thousand persons. In the midst of this saloon are placed two pulpits, whence the tribunes address the sovereign people".

In 1821, Ramón Feliú, the minister of the interior, dismissed the jefe politico of the province of Madrid, Francisco Copons for refusing to close down the Fontana de Oro, closure which was carried out immediately by the new jefe politico, José Martínez San Martín, who also arrested the Fontana's owner, Juan Antonio Gippini, on the pretext that the speakers there were doing so only with the authorisation of his predecessor. The case against Gippini was dismissed.

== Galdós's historical novel ==
The inn, and its historical importance in his times, inspired Benito Pérez Galdos's first novel, La Fontana de Oro (1870), subtitled "Historical novel", which was based on the meeting place for the liberals who would force King Fernando VII to promise to uphold the Spanish Constitution of 1812. Galdós's novel reflects the second phase of Fernando VII's reign, from Rafael del Riego's uprising in January 1820, leading to a liberal government ruling Spain during the Trienio Liberal, until April 1823 when, with the approval of the crowned heads of Europe, sanctioned by the Holy Alliance, a French army invaded Spain and reinstated the King's and the absolutist monarchy.
