= Exaltados =

Political faction in Spain

The Exaltados ('Fanatics' or 'Extremists', in the sense of 'radicals') was the label given to the most left-wing or progressive political current of liberalism in nineteenth-century Spain. Associated with, and at times inspired by, French Jacobinism and republicanism, it corresponded to the political current known more generally as Radicalism.

== The War of Independence and the Constitution of 1812 ==
The Exaltados emerged following the Spanish War of Independence (1808-1814) against the French Empire. The old absolute monarchy of the Bourbons had been replaced with a Napoleonic monarchy which, inspired by the Enlightenment, was autocratic in nature but moderately progressive in content.

The war had therefore divided the country. Some Spaniards, known as afrancesados (roughly, Francophiles or Frenchified, lit. French-like) supported the new regime because of its Enlightened direction. Many others opposed it because of both its progressivism and its foreign origins, wishing to restore the absolute monarchy.

But a significant number of Spaniards opposed the Napoleonic regime due to its foreign origins or autocratic nature, while agreeing with some or all of the principles of the French Revolution. These became known as the Liberals. They fought not to restore the absolutist and traditionalist Ancien Régime but for a political system equivalent to, but separate from, the French Republic: an Enlightened, constitutional and parliamentary regime proper to the Spanish nation.

At the end of the War of Independence Joseph Bonaparte and the troops of the French Empire were expelled before the deposed King Ferdinand VII had time to return to office. In the interim, the various liberal factions organised elections to establish a Constituent assembly, the Cortes of Cádiz, to create a national constitution inspired by Enlightenment and French Revolutionary principles: the Constitution of Cádiz (1812).

== The Three Liberal Years (1820-23) and the Veinteañistas ==
After the restoration of the absolute monarchy in 1814, the liberal tradition of 1812 split in two:

- Those known as Moderados (Moderates) were the more socially-conservative liberals who sought not to revolutionise society or culture but merely constitutionalise the monarchy. As they sought to do so by restoring the suspended Constitution of 1812, they came to be labelled Doceañistas, or 'Supporters of the Constitution of 1812'. They could be thought of as counterparts to the French Republic's Girondin faction.
- The more hardline liberal faction became known as Exaltados. They rejected the Moderates' compromises with the absolute monarchy, in favour of a new regime with greater progressive and democratic content than the Constitution of 1812. Because they sought a brand new constitution for the year 1820 they were labelled Veinteañistas ('Supporters of the Constitution of 1820'), though their proposed constitution never materialised. They also sought a more root-and-branch revolution than the Moderates, hoping to transform society and culture with Enlightenment values rather than merely setting out the legal rules for parliamentary government. The Exaltados could thus roughly be thought of as the counterpart of the French Republic's Jacobin faction, or the contemporary Carbonari in Italy.

The term Exaltados came from the group's more radical and revolutionary form of liberalism, as well as their concern to revolutionise culture with the values of the Enlightenment within the context of Romanticism. In common with Radicals elsewhere, they regarded the Revolution as an ongoing process of permanent progress. In constitutional terms, they envisaged limiting the monarchy to a highly restricted role, that of executing the will of parliament. If a new constitution were not possible, they sought to implement to the letter the more transformative elements of the Constitution of 1812, complemented by legislation.

Their legislative programme consisted of measures that would lead to the eradication of institutions associated with the Ancien Regime: the transformation of property from feudal to capitalist ownership (disentailment of feudal properties, abolition of aristocratic titles). In religious affairs they sought a system of laicity, with the dissolution of the Society of Jesus (Jesuits) a particular demand. They sought a three-level educational reform, and a territorial reorganisation into rational provinces on the model of the French départments.

The group's social base consisted of the urban middle classes, as well as a large portion of the new generation of military officers that had been produced by the War of Independence. This latter group, of middling to humble social origins and influenced by the ideas of the French Revolution, had a grievance against Ferdinand VII for demobilising them after the war.

Among their most prominent members were President of Parliament and General Rafael de Riego, General Francisco Espoz y Mina, the future heads of government José María Calatrava and Juan Álvarez Mendizábal, and the future minister Antonio Alcalá Galiano.

The Exaltados were particularly prominent at the beginning and end of the Three Liberal Years. After playing an active role in the initial Revolution of 1820, they were sidelined for two years by the more socially-conservative liberal Moderates. The Exaltados were brought back to power in July 1822, when the National Militia was mobilised to suppress the Royal Guards' attempted counter-revolution. The Exaltados leveraged the situation to have one of their own elected President of Government, Evaristo San Miguel. In response, in 1823 the French absolute monarch Louis XVIII led an invasion to restore the deposed Ferdinand VII. The restoration of the absolute monarchy led to a ten-year period of repression against the Exaltados, including the execution of Riego. Chased out of the parliamentary sphere, radical liberals turned to clandestine organisation (carbonarism) or pronunciamientos by sympathetic military officers.

== The Isabelline Monarchy and the Progressive Party ==
Ferdinand VII died in 1833, succeeded by his daughter Isabel II. Isabel's young age allowed a series of regents to pivot the monarchy in a new direction; this came at a time when several European monarchies were undergoing internal conservative-liberal democratisation: the Isabelline period fell into a similar line as the French July Monarchy of 1830, the Belgian Revolution of 1830-31, and the English Great Reform of 1832.

Under the Regency, the repression of the Exaltados was ended, allowing them to organise themselves into a new political faction. By 1834 the Spanish Congress of Deputies had a sizeable faction of former Exaltados and like-minded radical democrats; by 1836 many, though not all, of them had organised themselves into a more structured entity, the Progressive Party.

The Progressive Party ended up as one of the two main Spanish political parties between 1834 and 1870, alternating in power with the more conservative, but still liberal, Moderate Party. This rapprochement between the radical-liberal and conservative-liberal traditions was facilitated by the emergence of Carlism, an ultra-royalist movement that opposed parliamentary government and wished to restore the absolute monarchy.

In 1835 Queen Regent Maria Cristina named a veteran Exaltado, Juan Álvarez Mendizábal, as president of government (prime minister), with the Progressives forming the core of his parliamentary support. However, the Queen Regent's refusal to issue a constitutional charter recognising the principle of national sovereignty alienated the Progressives. They insisted on a return to the Constitution of 1812, or the drafting of a more progressive constitution.

In 1837 a revolt by radical military officers prompted Maria Cristina to again appoint a government of Exaltados and accede to the demands of the Progressives, who held a majority in congress. The result was the Constitution of 1837, a compromise between the two liberal parties, the more radical Progressives and the more conservative Moderates. This constitution upheld several of the fundamental principles of the Exaltado tradition, notably citizens' juries, a citizens' National Militia, and a bill of citizens' rights; the radicals compromised on other areas, such as the affirmation of the principle of popular national sovereignty, the ceremonial role of the monarchy, and the abolition of the Senate.

By 1840 relations between the radical-liberal and conservative-liberal groups had soured. A reform of local administration by one Moderate government, seen as a power-grab by the Progressive deputies, prompted the latter to walk out of parliament and demand that the widely popular war hero General Espartero be appointed regent to preserve the spirit of the constitution. Espartero's autocratic rule (1840–43) quickly disillusioned them and the Exaltados united with the Moderates to oust him. Relations between the two liberal parties had soured, leading the Moderates to turn to the absolutists for support, and draft a distinctly more conservative constitution in 1845. This sparked fears that the Progressives would henceforth be excluded from government.

At this moment of volatility, the example of the Revolutions of 1848 in Europe prompted a shake-up of the Spanish parliamentary system:

- The Democratic Progressive Party (more formally, the Democratic Progressive Party) was formed in 1849 by the left-wing Progressives. These had long been demanding a root-and-branch institutional reform of the Isabelline Monarchy. In 1848 were inspired by the example of the proclamation of the Second Republic in France. They now took a hard-line on universal suffrage and a republican state, leaving to form a new party dedicated to these principles. The Democrats considered their new party to be the true heir to the radical tradition of the Exaltados.
- The Liberal Union was formed (1858) as a synthesis of the various centrist liberal currents to the right of the Democrats. Unlike the republican and universal-suffragist Democrats, the party remnants accepted constitutional monarchy and a suffrage restricted to property-owners; this brought them close to the position of the conservative-liberals on the centrist wing of the Moderate Party. As a result, the centrist wing of both parties merged to form the Liberal Union.
- A small number of Progressives remained loyal to the original party, which faded into insignificance.

This realignment of parties brought political instability. As the Moderates veered to the right over the 1840s, the Democrats and Progressives pressed for a change in government. A revolution in 1852, mirroring those elsewhere in Europe in 1848, backed by the progressive general Espartero and the centre-right General O'Donnell brought the Progressives to power; they were ousted in 1854 after a second revolution by O'Donnell.

After the Revolution of 1854, O'Donnell gathered to him the moderate elements from the Progressive Party and the liberal elements from the Moderate Party, forming the Liberal Union which dominated Spanish government from 1858 to 1868.

== The Glorious Revolution (1868) and the First Republic (1870-72) ==
By 1863, the radical wing of the Progressive Party had split; by 1888 these had formed the Radical Democratic Party, known informally as the Radical Party.

== Radical Republicanism and the Second Republic (1931-39) ==
Before and during the Second Republic, the main political party of the republican left, the Radical Socialist Republican Party, was associated with the Exaltado tradition.
