= Bombardment of Beirut (1840) =

1840 bombardment during the Egyptian–Ottoman War

- Part of the Egyptian–Ottoman War (1839–1841)
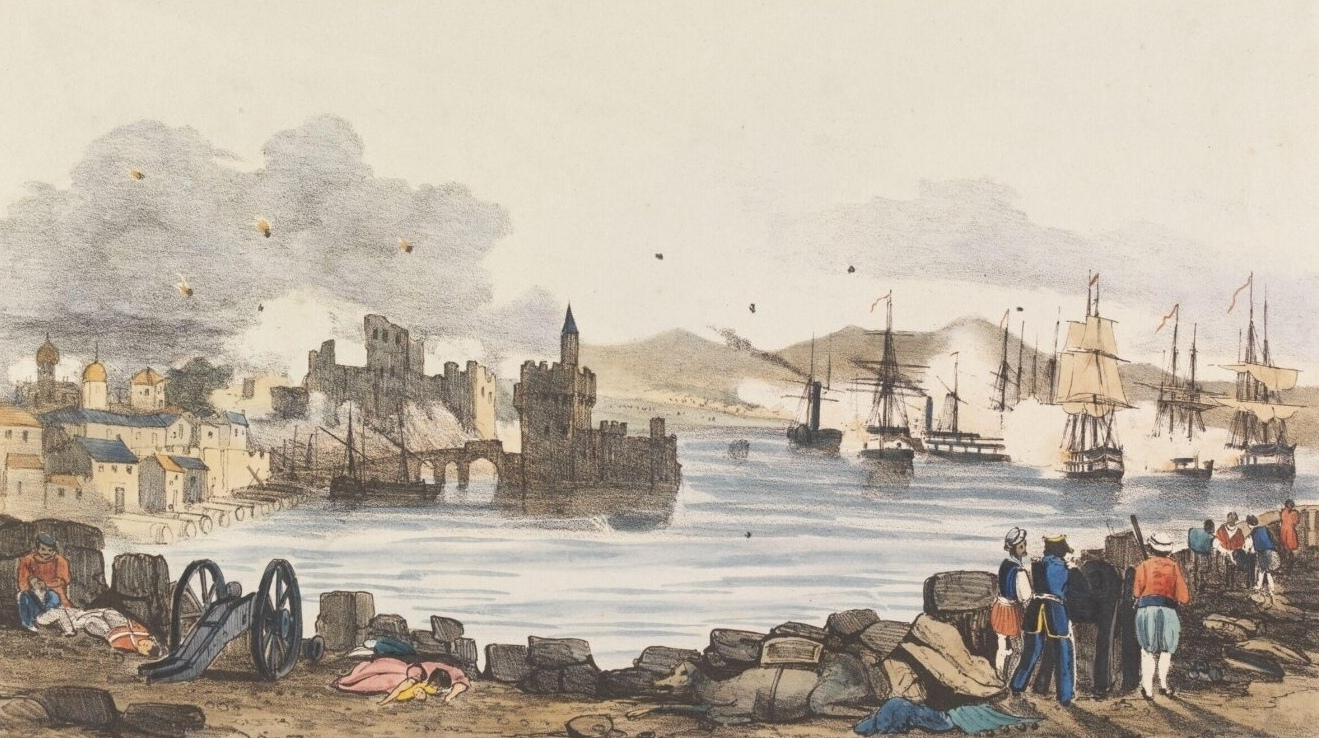
- Bombardment of Beyrout by the Combined Forces
Date	10 September 1840
Location	Beirut, modern day Lebanon
Result	Anglo-Austro-Ottoman victory

Belligerents
Egypt	(United Kingdom of Great Britain and Ireland) United Kingdom; Ottoman Empire; Austrian Empire

Commanders and leaders
Muhammad Ali Pasha	(United Kingdom of Great Britain and Ireland) Robert Stopford (United Kingdom of Great Britain and Ireland) Charles Napier (Austrian Empire) Archduke Friedrich

Strength
2,700	1,500 British; 5,000 Ottomans; 200 Austrians

Casualties and losses
Unknown	Unknown

The bombardment of Beirut (1840) was a battle during the Egyptian–Ottoman War (1839–1841). It ended in an Allied victory and the city was captured.

== Course of the bombardment ==
Egyptian troops marched along the coast to prevent the Anglo-Ottomans from taking Beirut. However, the city was constantly shelled and the landing force was rapidly carried to D'jounie Bay. Charles Napier's army of British, Austrian, Ottoman and rebel troops entrenched themselves. After heavy shelling the city fell to the Allies.
