= José Miguel de la Cueva, 14th Duke of Alburquerque =

Spanish general and ambassador (1775–1811)

José Miguel de la Cueva y de la Cerda
- 14th Duke of Alburquerque
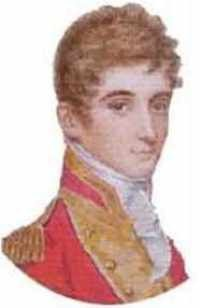
- Born: 26 December 1775; Madrid
- Died: 18 February 1811 (aged 35); London
- Occupation: General

General José Miguel de la Cueva y de la Cerda, 14th Duke of Alburquerque (1775–1811) was an aristocrat, diplomat, and senior Spanish officer in the Peninsular War. (Note: García León gives his full name as José María de la Cueva y de la Cerda, XIV Duque de Alburquerque (José María de la Cueva and de la Cerda, 14th Duke of Albuquerque) (García León 2007, p. 50)) (Note: Oman spells the surname Albuquerque. (Oman, 1902: Transcriber's note.))

== Biography ==
=== Early career ===
After serving as a cadet in the Queen's Dragoons Regiment (Regimiento de Dragones de la Reina), he was promoted to captain in 1792. Thanks to his family's influence, he was rapidly promoted to lieutenant colonel in 1793, to colonel the following year and, in 1795, at the age of 19, he was promoted to Cavalry brigadier and given the command of the Lusitania Dragoons Regiment.

On inheriting his father's titles in 1803, he resigned from his regiment.

=== Peninsular War ===
==== 1808 ====
At the start of the war, Alburquerque was given command of the Army of Castille, serving under Pignatelli, and on its dissolution he was transferred to Castaños's corps.

==== 1809 ====
He was promoted to field marshal the following November and in January 1809 the Duke del Infantado gave him the command of vanguard of the Army of the centre, replacing Venegas, an appointment he took up following the Spanish defeat at Uclés (13 January).

With General Cartaojal now in command of the Army of the centre, in February, Alburquerque, still at the head of the vanguard division, comprising 2,000 horse and 9,000 infantry, tried to surprise Digeon's brigade of dragoons at Mora, and shortly after his division was forced to retreat at Consuegra by Sebastiani, who had arrived with his 1st division of the 4th Corps, and two brigades of Latour-Maubourg's cavalry.

When Cartaojal met up with his vanguard, the two commanders disagreed about the next move, with Alburquerque keen to advance on Toledo with Cartaojal's full force, while his superior proposed that Alburquerque go ahead alone with a single division of infantry. At that moment orders came from the Supreme Junta that troops were to be detached from Cartaojal's Army of La Mancha to strengthen Cuesta's Army of Extremaduran. Cartaojal seized the opportunity to send Alburquerque off with a division of seven infantry battalions (4,500 men) and a cavalry regiment of only 264 sabres, and which arrived just in time to see action at Medellín. In April, Alburquerque was promoted to lieutenant general.

In July, Alburquerque commanded the six regiments of the 2nd Cavalry Division of the Army of the Centre at the Battle of Talavera.

The following month, he was routed at the Battle of Arzobispo (8 August). And although, in Oman's words, Alburquerque "showed plenty of useless personal courage", his losses were substantial: over 800 men killed or wounded; 600 men and 400 horses captured; together with his divisional battery of 16 guns.

==== 1810 ====
In 1810, Alburquerque commanded the Army of Estremadura and on 4 February entered Cadiz with 11,000 men, securing it as a Spanish base. He was appointed governor of the city, but he fell out with General Gregorio García de la Cuesta and resigned.

On 2 March he substituted Venegas as captain general of Andalusia and was appointed president of the Junta of Cádiz. However, due to his disgreements with the Regency, he was dismissed and, at the end of that month, he was appointed Spanish ambassador to the Court of Saint James in London. He died the following February in London, and his funeral took place in Westminster Abbey.

==== Funeral service ====
Following the service at the Chapel-Royal of Spain, St James's, Spanish Place, just off Manchester Square, in London, the procession, headed by an escort of the 15th Light Dragoons, then proceeded to Westminster Abbey, where another funeral service was held, with most of the ministers of the British government in attendance. The hearse, drawn by six horses, was followed by eleven mourning carriages, including those of Apodaca, as chief mourner; the Foreign Secretary, Richard Wellesley; and Sir Robert Wilson; several other carriages of British and foreign dignatories, and followed by over a hundred other carriages of nobility and gentry, the whole brought up by another detachment of the 15th Light Dragoons.

== See also ==
- Duke of Alburquerque

== Bibliography ==
- García León, José María (2007). En Torno a Las Cortes de Cádiz (in Spanish). Quorum Editores. p. 50. ISBN 978-8-488599-92-6.
- Haythornthwaite, Philip J. (2004). The Complete Companion to the Iberian Campaigns 1807–14. Brassey's almanac (illustrated ed.). Brassey's. p. 66. ISBN 978-1-85753-329-3.
- Musteen, Jason R. (2011). Nelson's Refuge: Gibraltar in the Age of Napoleon. Naval Institute Press. p. 129. ISBN 978-1-61251-084-2.
- Rickard, J. (17 April 2008). "Combat of Arzobispo, 8 August 1809".
