= Ejército del Centro (1808) =

Army of the Centre
- Ejército del Centro (Spanish)
- Active: 28 October 1808
- Country: Spain
- Type: Field army
- Engagements: Peninsular War; Battle of Uclés (1809); Battle of Ciudad Real; Battle of Ocaña

Commanders
- Notable commanders: Francisco Javier Castaños, 1st Duke of Bailén

The Ejército del Centro (Army of the Centre) was one of the four large corps, plus a reserve, that resulted from the re-organisation of the existing regiments and corps of the Spanish Army in the early months of Spain's War of Independence (1808–1814), part of the Peninsular War (1807–1814).

== Background ==
The jubilation following General Castaños' mid-July victory at Bailén was short-lived, and General Merlin's sacking of Bilbao, on 16 August 1808, caused much popular discontent throughout the country, which was aimed specifically at the Juntas and the generals.

The Junta Central published a political manifesto on 10 November 1808 (dated 28 October 1808), in which, among other declarations, it announced its intention of maintaining a force of 500,000 troops, together with 50,000 cavalry.

Spain's new Army would be presided over by a Junta Central de Guerra (Central War Board), to be headed by Francisco Javier Castaños, 1st Duke of Bailén.

== Structure ==
According to the manifesto, the Army of the Centre would be made up of the four divisions from Andalucia (under Castaños), together with those of Castile (under General Cuesta), Extremadura and those of Valencia and Murcia that had entered Madrid under Pedro González Llamas. It was hoped that the British forces would join this Army in the event that they decided to advance up towards France.

On 11 January 1809, the Ejército del Centro comprised an effective and available force of 20,505 troops and officers, of a total force of 30,097 men. Headed by Field marshal, the Duke of Albuquerque (at the head of the Vanguard); Lieutenant general, the Marquis de Coupigny, at the head of the 1st Division; Field marshal, the Count of Orgaz, at the head of the 2nd Division, and Lieutenant general Manuel de Lapeña heading the Reserve troops.

Although this structure was maintained until December 1810, there were some modifications to the original organisation. The Ejército de Estremadura was never fully integrated into the Ejercito del Centro, although two of its divisions did participate at Burgos (10 November 1808) and some of its troops, together with troops from the Ejercito del Centro, fought at Somosierra (30 November 1808). However, they were reincorporated into the Ejercito de Estremadura in January 1809.
