= John Byne Skerrett =

- Born: c. 1778; Cheshire, England
- Died: 11 March 1814; Bergen op Zoom, Netherlands
- Alma mater: Rugby School
- Relatives: John Nicholas Skerrett (father); Anne Byne (mother)
- Military career
- Allegiance: United Kingdom
- Branch: British Army
- Service years: 1783–1814
- Rank: Major-General
- Unit: Various regiments
- Commands: 83rd Regiment of Foot; 10th Reserve Battalion; 47th Regiment of Foot; 2nd Brigade, Cádiz; Tarifa Garrison; Fusilier Brigade, 4th Division; Brigade, Light Division
- Conflicts: Napoleonic Wars; Peninsular War; Siege of Cádiz; Siege of Tarifa; Battle of Vitoria; Battle of the Bidassoa; Siege of Bergen op Zoom (DOW)
- Awards: Army Gold Medal
- Memorials: St Paul's Cathedral; Newcastle Cathedral

Major-General John Byne Skerrett (1777 – 10 March 1814) was a British army officer who fought in the Peninsular War.

== Biography ==
Born in Cheshire, John Byrne Skerrett was the only son of Lieutenant General John Nicholas Skerrett. He was appointed ensign in the 99th Regiment of Foot in 1783, lieutenant 79th Foot in 1784, lieutenant 19th Foot in 1791, captain 123rd Foot in 1795, captain 69th Foot 1795, major 83rd Foot in 1798, lieutenant-colonel 83rd Foot in 1800, half-pay 1803, lieutenant-colonel 10th Battalion Reserve in 1803, lieutenant-colonel 47th Foot in 1804, brevet colonel in 1810 and major-general in 1813.

In the Peninsular War he was with his regiment in Cádiz in 1809 when appointed to the command of the 2nd British Brigade (2/47th (Lancashire) and 20th Portuguese Infantry, two battalions) in May. Then Skerrett and his own regiment, the 2/47th, was detached as part of the doomed attempt to aid the beleaguered Spanish garrison at Tarragona. Skerrett and his detachment rejoined the force at Cádiz in July.

Skerrett was commander of the British defending force at the Siege of Tarifa in 1811 and 1812, and participated in the Battle of the Triana Bridge in 1812.

He was a brigade commander under Sir Thomas Graham in the Netherlands from 1813 to 1814 and died in the assault on Bergen op Zoom in 1814.

There is a memorial to Skerrett in the north transept of St Paul's Cathedral, London, and another, raised by his mother, was in St George's Porch of St Nicholas' Church, Newcastle upon Tyne (now Newcastle Cathedral) in the early 19th century.
