= Burn Hall, County Durham =

Country house in County Durham, England

Coordinates: 54.74233°N 1.59655°W

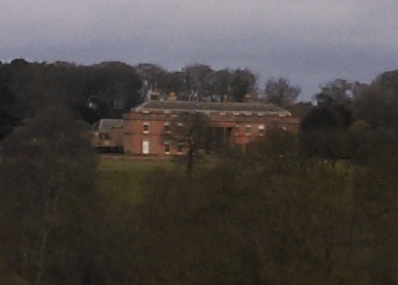

Burn Hall is a country house in County Durham. It is a Grade II* listed building.

== History ==
Around 1812, Bryan John Salvin of Croxdale purchased a manor house, dating back to the 13th century, called New Burnhall. Ignatius Bonomi redesigned it from 1821 to 1834 in the gothic and neoclassical style under the name Burn Hall. It remained in the Salvin family until Marmaduke Henry Salvin died in 1924 and it was acquired by Saint Joseph's Missionary Society of Mill Hill which established a boys' school there.

The seminary closed to full time students in 1995 when the costs of training priests became prohibitive. The restoration of the main house and the redevelopment of the area to the rear by Jane Darbyshire Associates won the City Trust's architectural commendation of the year in 1998.
