= Partidas realistas =

Royalist guerrilla groups in Spain during the Liberal Triennium (1820–1823)

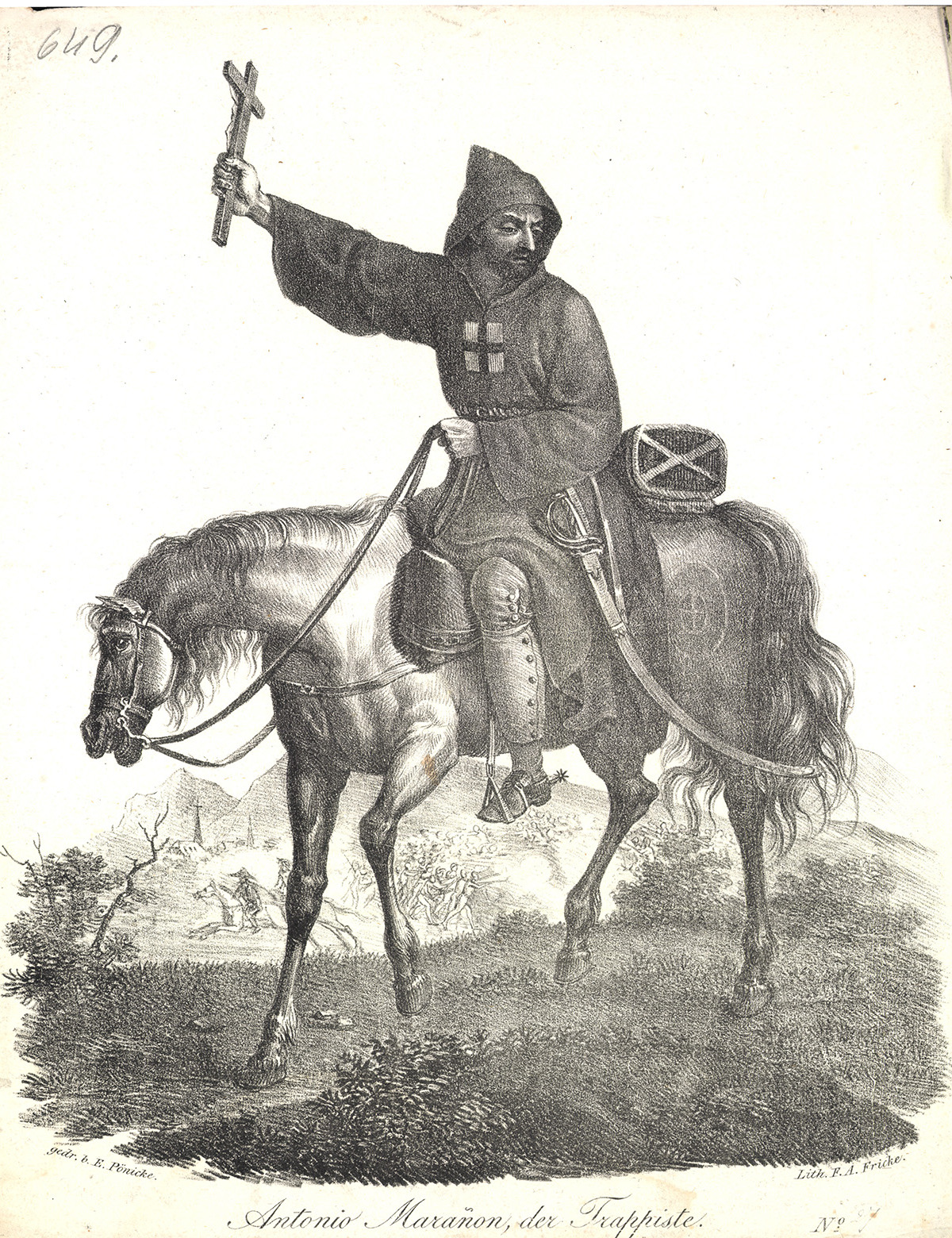
Antonio Marañón, known as "El Trapense," depicted in a lithograph by Friedrich August Fricke (1784–1858). A prominent leader of the partidas realistas, his flamboyant attire reportedly inspired popular support, portraying him as a divinely inspired figure akin to biblical heroes.

The partidas realistas (Spanish for royalist militias) were groups of absolutist guerrilla fighters that emerged in Spain during the Liberal Triennium (1820–1823). Their goal was to overthrow the constitutional regime established after the Revolution of 1820 and restore the absolute power of King Ferdinand VII. These militias served as the armed wing of the counter-revolution, a broad movement encompassing the political strategies of reactionary elites aimed at dismantling the revolution and suppressing liberalism. The counter-revolution began the moment Ferdinand VII reluctantly swore allegiance to the Spanish Constitution of 1812 on March 9, 1820. Despite his oath, the king never accepted the constitutional system and immediately began conspiring against it, leading the movement with the complicity of court members and senior state officials who also opposed liberalism. As the Marquis de las Amarillas noted in his memoirs, "None [of the ministers] could ignore that the King secretly protected uprisings against the Constitution he had been forced to swear to uphold."

While the first partidas appeared in 1820, their numbers increased from the spring of 1821 and peaked in 1822, sparking a full-scale civil war—known as the Royalist War—in Catalonia, Navarre, and the Basque Country. Initially defeated by constitutionalist forces, the royalists were forced to flee to France or Portugal. However, the French-led expedition of 1823, bolstered by reorganized Spanish royalist troops from exile and surviving militias, marked the triumph of the counter-revolution. Ferdinand VII was freed from what royalists called his "captivity," the constitutional regime was abolished, and absolutism was restored, ushering in the so-called Ominous Decade.

== History ==
The partidas realistas began their operations in the earliest days of the constitutional regime, with the first known groups emerging in Galicia as early as April 1820. Organized by absolutist exiles in France and closely tied to the royal palace, these militias employed tactics reminiscent of the guerrilla warfare used during Spain's War of Independence against Napoleon Bonaparte (1808–1814)—some of their members were even veterans of that earlier conflict, now fighting for the royalist cause. Historians Pedro Rújula and Manuel Chust argue that this continuity with past guerrilla efforts explains their rapid and effective mobilization: "Many who fought the French had not only grown accustomed to wielding arms and rallying to defend local interests but had also internalized discourses legitimizing their actions in the name of king, religion, and homeland." The Marquis de Mataflorida, a key agent of Ferdinand VII and a leading figure among royalist exiles, wrote in a December 1821 manifesto published in France: "Due to [this] oppression, armed militias have sprung up everywhere, burdening localities but aiding them in maintaining their independence and defiance of any constitutional authority, whose legitimacy they cannot accept."

Leadership of the partidas typically came from clerics (50% in Navarre), nobles (45% in Galicia), landowners, and peasants, supplemented in Catalonia by the Mossos d'Esquadra. Ramon Arnabat points that the majority of its members, however, consisted largely of propertyless individuals from the poorest strata of society—day laborers, tenant farmers, and, to a lesser extent, artisans, manual workers, and weavers from mid-sized towns—forming the social backbone of royalism.

Initially limited in scope, the partidas expanded significantly from spring 1821. Their operations gradually shifted northward from southern (Andalusia) and central (La Mancha) Spain to regions like Galicia, Asturias, Castile and León, Extremadura, the Basque Country, Navarre, Aragon, the Valencian Community, and Catalonia. Between 1820 and 1821, their numbers tripled. Prominent groups included those led by the priest Jerónimo Merino in Burgos; Joaquín Ibáñez Cuevas, Baron de Eroles, and Antonio Marañón, "El Trapense", in Catalonia; Pedro Zaldívar in the Serranía de Ronda; Manuel Hernández, "El Abuelo" ("The Grandfather"), in Madrid and Aranjuez; and Manuel Freire de Andrade and Canon Manuel Chantre of Santiago de Compostela, who formed the Junta Apostólica ("Apostolic Committee") in Galicia.

The rise of the partidas realistas stemmed from the convergence of the counter-revolution—driven by reactionary elites from the outset of the Liberal Triennium—and an "anti-revolution" among the lower classes, who felt culturally and socially alienated by revolutionary and liberal policies. This alliance, dominated by the counter-revolutionary elite, united under a shared opposition to the constitutional system and a defense of the king's absolute power and the Catholic Church's cultural hegemony.

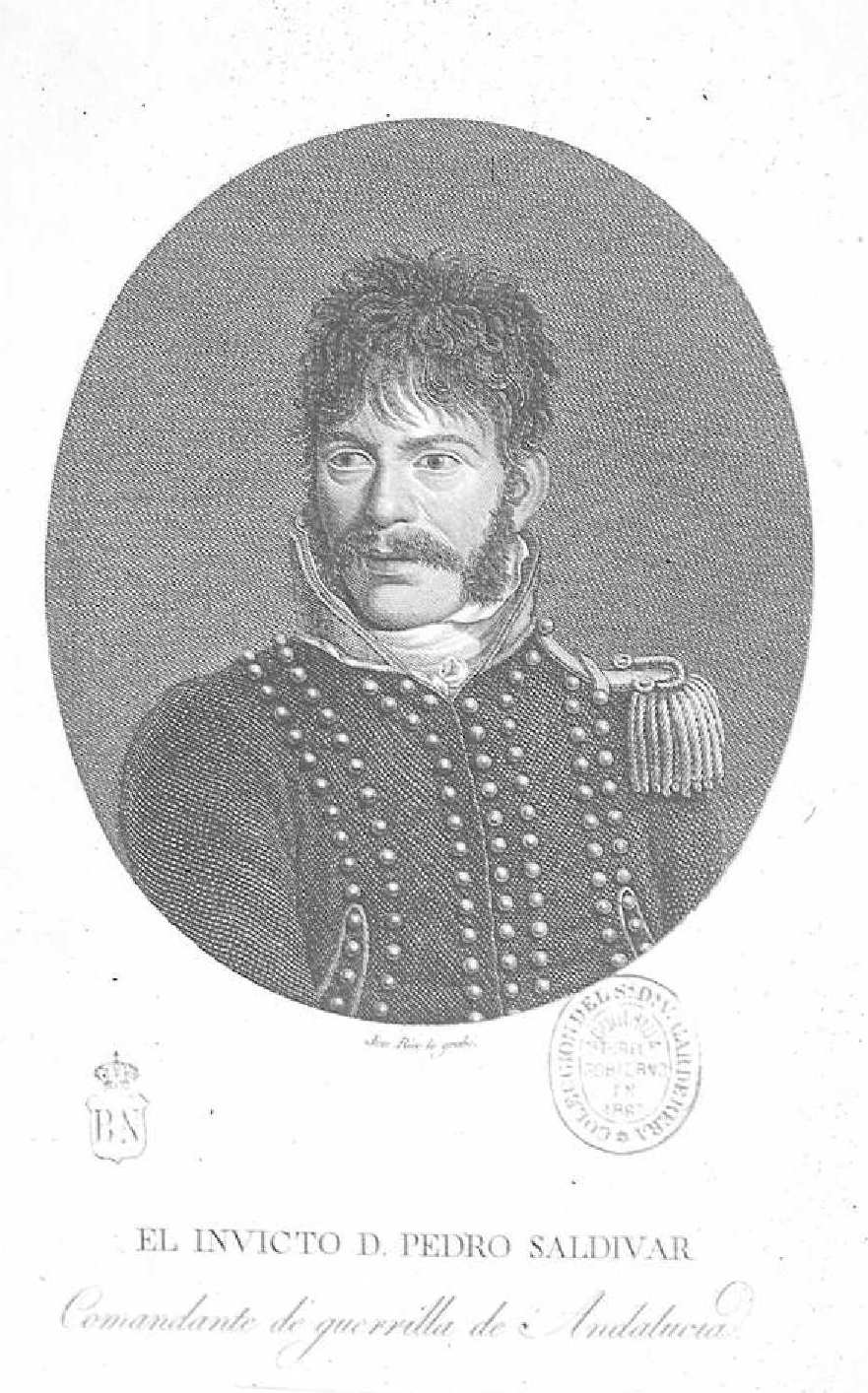
Pedro Zaldívar, leader of a partida realista active in the Serranía de Ronda.

It was precisely the Church, predominantly opposed to the liberal regime due to the disentailments, that played a decisive role in forming and consolidating an alliance between the two anti-liberal factions. The Church facilitated this coalition by controlling key spaces of formal peasant sociability—such as parishes, confraternities, and popular festivals—and by engaging in significant propaganda efforts to discredit the constitutional regime. Leveraging its enduring social position and moral authority, the clergy channeled widespread social discontent into support for royalism. Beyond this, many clerics directly participated in royalist partidas (guerrilla bands), occasionally leading them, as exemplified by the renowned Father Merino. The Church, particularly the regular clergy, provided the royalist block with ideological backing by promoting a narrative of a "war of religion." This rhetoric resonated primarily in rural areas, where, unlike in large cities, it faced little competition from liberal discourse. The counter-revolutionary message also permeated urban artisan communities, the unemployed, and the uprooted.

The counter-revolution found its initial foothold "in struggling small towns and mid-sized cities with a strong ecclesiastical presence, where the counter-revolution and anti-revolution first converged." These locales witnessed uprisings preceded by intense anti-revolutionary campaigns, typically orchestrated by the clergy and following a consistent pattern: "Whenever local or national authorities made decisions contrary to the moral or material interests of the urban popular classes, counter-revolutionary forces successfully mobilized and capitalized on the resulting anti-revolutionary sentiment." Social discontent was thus transformed into counter-revolutionary political action—or, in other words, "anti-revolution was integrated into the counter-revolution"—thanks to the existence of "counter-revolutionary networks composed of certain nobles, members of the ecclesiastical hierarchy, affluent peasant sectors, and partida leaders, who recruited, armed, and financed the partidas realistas (royalist guerrillas), channeling needs and sentiments. Local authorities, controlling municipalities in service of the counter-revolution, played a fundamental role here."

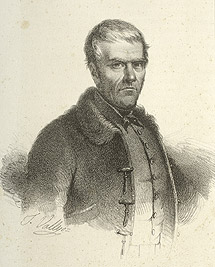
Father Merino, a guerrilla leader who fought the French during the War of Independence, led an active partida realista during the Liberal Triennium, supporting the French invasion of the Spanish Expedition.

At the apex of the counter-revolutionary movement stood the king. However, he was not the sole leader of the conspiracy. The counter-revolution is better understood as a network of complicity articulated across multiple centers. The monarch's primary role was to "lend coherence to the counter-revolution by providing the unifying element: that of a paternal king, beloved by the people—so long as he took up arms in their defense—and stripped of his legitimate throne by a conspiratorial, sectarian minority."

In the spring of 1822, the actions of the partidas realistas intensified significantly, particularly in Catalonia, Navarre, the Basque Country, Galicia, Aragon, and the Valencian Country, with more sporadic activity in Asturias, Old Castile, the León region, Murcia, and New Castile. A pivotal event occurred on June 21, when royalists captured La Seu d'Urgell, as "from that moment, the counter-revolution gained a rebel stronghold on Spanish soil—one of the conditions France had set for lending its support to the king." When news reached Aranjuez, the courtiers were galvanized, and their conspiratorial activities regained momentum.

The royalist uprising spread to such an extent that "during the summer and fall in Catalonia, the Basque Country, and Navarre, a veritable civil war unfolded, impossible to remain neutral in, leaving the civilian population severely battered on both sides: reprisals, requisitions, war contributions, looting, and more." The royalists managed to assemble an army numbering between 25,000 and 30,000 men.

However, military measures adopted by the Parliament and the government—combined with the declaration of a martial law in Catalonia on July 23—proved effective. Over the fall and winter of 1822–1823, following a grueling six-month campaign, constitutional armies, led in part by the former guerrilla Espoz y Mina, reversed the situation. They forced royalists from Catalonia, Navarre, and the Basque Country (approximately 12,000 men) to flee to France, while those from Galicia, Old Castile, León, and Extremadura (around 2,000 men) escaped to Portugal.

The situation took a definitive turn on April 7, 1823, when the expeditionary force sent by France—supported by Spanish royalist troops organized prior to the invasion (estimated at between 12,000 and 35,000 men, depending on sources)—entered Spain. As they advanced, surviving royalist militias from the constitutional army's offensive joined their ranks. Historians like Juan Francisco Fuentes highlight the paradox that many members of these royalist militias and supporting troops had fought against the French fifteen years earlier during the War of Independence.

== See also ==
- Ultraroyalists (Spain)
- Royalist Volunteers

== Bibliography ==
- Arnabat, Ramon (2020). "La contrarrevolución y la antirrevolución". In Pedro Rújula and Ivana Frasquet (ed.). El Trienio Liberal (1820–1823). Una mirada política (in Spanish). Granada: Comares. pp. 285–307. ISBN 978-84-9045-976-8.
- Bahamonde, Ángel; Martínez, Jesús Antonio (2011) [1994]. Historia de España. Siglo XIX (in Spanish) (6th ed.). Madrid: Cátedra. ISBN 978-84-376-1049-8.
- Fontana, Josep (1979). La crisis del Antiguo Régimen, 1808-1833 (in Spanish). Barcelona: Crítica. ISBN 84-7423-084-5.
- Fuentes, Juan Francisco (2007). El fin del Antiguo Régimen (1808–1868). Política y sociedad (in Spanish). Madrid: Síntesis. ISBN 978-84-975651-5-8.
- Fuentes, Juan Francisco (2008). ""Yo no valgo nada": Rafael del Riego y la revolución liberal española". In Manuel Pérez Ledesma and Isabel Burdiel (ed.). Liberales eminentes (in Spanish). Madrid: Marcial Pons. pp. 13–41. ISBN 978-84-96467-66-8.
- Gil Novales, Alberto (2020) [1980]. Ramon Arnabat (preliminary study and edition) (ed.). El Trienio Liberal (in Spanish). Zaragoza: Prensas de la Universidad de Zaragoza. ISBN 978-84-1340-071-6.
- Ramos Santana, Alberto (2020). "De Cádiz a Las Cabezas de San Juan y viceversa. El pronunciamiento de Riego". Andalucía en la historia (in Spanish) (68): 76–79. Archived from the original on November 26, 2024.
- Rújula, Pedro (2020). "El Rey". In Pedro Rújula and Ivana Frasquet (ed.). El Trienio Liberal (1820–1823). Una mirada política (in Spanish). Granada: Comares. pp. 3–38. ISBN 978-84-9045-976-8.
- Rújula, Pedro; Chust, Manuel (2020). El Trienio Liberal en la monarquía hispánica. Revolución e independencia (1820–1823) (in Spanish). Madrid: Los Libros de la Catarata. ISBN 978-84-9097-937-2.
- Sánchez Martín, Víctor (2020). "El ejército". In Pedro Rújula and Ivana Frasquet (ed.). El Trienio Liberal (1820–1823). Una mirada política (in Spanish). Granada: Comares. pp. 131–153. ISBN 978-84-9045-976-8.
