= Ultraroyalists (Spain) =

Spanish monarchist faction during the Ominous Decade (1823–1833)

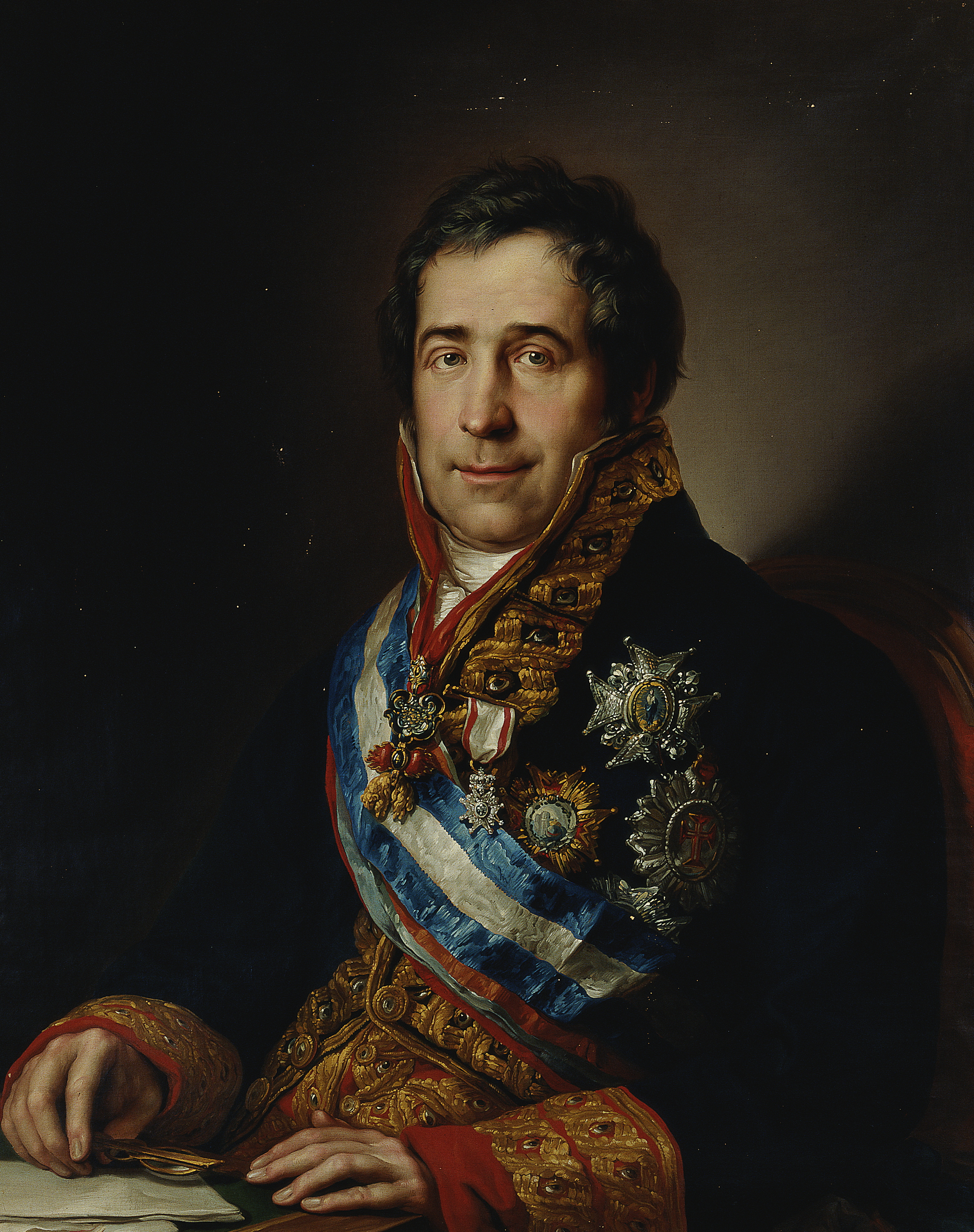
Francisco Tadeo Calomarde, Secretary of the Department of Grace and Justice from 1823 to 1833, was the most influential ultra during the Ominous Decade. .

During the Ominous Decade (1823–1833) of Ferdinand VII of Spain's reign, the ultraroyalists (Spanish: ultrarrealistas), also known as apostolics (apostólicos), ultra-absolutists (ultraabsolutistas), or simply ultras (ultras), were advocates of extreme or "pure" absolutism. They stood in opposition to the "reformist" absolutists, who favored moderating absolutism in response to pressures from the Quadruple Alliance and Restoration France. The latter's intervention in Spain in October 1823 had ended the constitutional regime of the Liberal Triennium, established following the successful pronunciamiento of Riego in January 1820.

The ultras sought a full restoration of absolutism, including the reinstatement of the Inquisition, which King Ferdinand VII—under European pressure—had not restored after its abolition by liberals during the Liberal Triennium. Their primary backer was the king’s brother, Carlos de Borbón, the heir presumptive due to Ferdinand’s failure to produce children after three marriages. This association also earned them the label "Carlists". The ultras were central to several uprisings, including those led by Joaquín Capapé in 1824 and Georges Bessières in 1825, with their most significant conflict being the War of the Aggrieved, which erupted in Catalonia in 1827.

== Terminology ==
The term "ultras" emerged from within ultraroyalist circles. In early 1824, the newspaper El Restaurador published an article titled "Brief Reflections on the Ultras," defining them as "subjects from the highest echelons of the state, the most distinguished families in society [...] who defend the principles of legitimacy and order. [...] They will argue in word and deed that thrones lack security as long as they rely on popular suffrage; that no true society exists without classes and hierarchies; and that philanthropic innovations are mere traps for Jacobin predation and tyranny." Liberals, meanwhile, dubbed them "apostolics."

From 1830 onward, the ultras or apostolics became known as "Carlists" when they rallied behind the Infante Carlos (Don Carlos) in the succession dispute triggered by Ferdinand VII’s promulgation of the Pragmatic Sanction of 1830. This decree shifted the inheritance of the Spanish crown from Don Carlos to Ferdinand’s newborn daughter, Isabella. Following Ferdinand’s death in September 1833, this conflict escalated into the First Carlist War.

== Ideology ==
Ángel Bahamonde and Jesús A. Martínez argue that the differences between what they term "illiberal reformists" and "ultra-royalists" were not political—both groups aimed to preserve an absolute monarchy—but strategic. The reformists advocated "administrative reform without political concessions" or "technical reformism," while the ultras rejected any change, however minor. As Josep Fontana notes, what united the diverse coalition of ultraroyalists was "hostility to the bourgeois liberalism of the Triennium—and the fear that moderate absolutism could lead to its restoration, even if only partially." Consequently, the ultras or apostolics demanded "the preservation of absolutism in its entirety and an ideological battle against modern ideas they equated with liberalism."

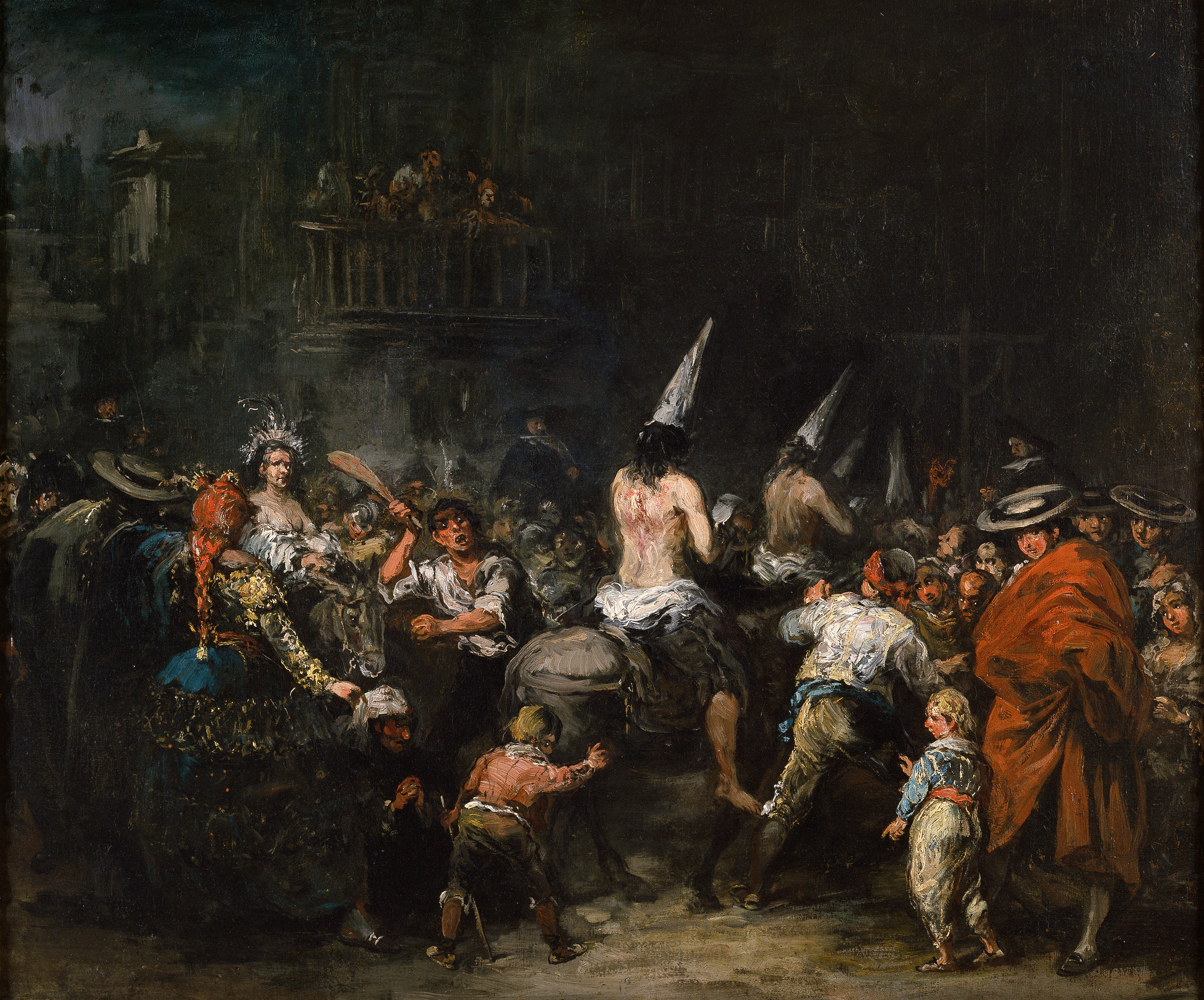
Condemned by the Inquisition by Eugenio Lucas Velázquez (Museo del Prado). The decision not to restore the Inquisition was a key, if not the primary, point of contention between the "ultras" and "reformists."

Emilio La Parra López emphasizes that, while both factions supported absolute monarchy, their differences extended beyond counter-revolutionary strategy to reflect distinct political and cultural traditions. The "moderate or pragmatic royalists," as La Parra López calls them, were successors to the enlightened elite who, under Charles III and Charles IV, worked to overcome resistance from the aristocracy and clergy to the Bourbon Reforms. These ilustrados (enlightened) adhered to Regalism, earning them the enmity of most ecclesiastics. In contrast, the "radical royalists, or ultras," drew from reactionary thought opposed to the Enlightenment. They viewed even the administrative reforms of the moderates as an assault on the divinely ordained natural order, leading to "anarchy." They sought a tight alliance between throne and altar, prioritizing the Church’s interests over the monarchy’s and advocating that civil laws conform to religious principles (theocracy). The Roman Church was seen as the sole interpreter of this "order," reflecting their Ultramontanism and the prominent role they assigned to clerics in public life. This stance fueled their persistent calls for the Inquisition’s restoration—"Inquisition, Lord, Inquisition, to exterminate heretical and subversive doctrines," they pleaded with the king—or at least, as the ultra Marquis of Villaverde de Limia demanded, that foreign books entering Spain be sent to the nearest bishop for approval or "ordered burned immediately... without further recourse or secular trial."

In their opposition to the reforms of the "moderate" absolutists—whom they disparagingly labeled "liberals"—the ultras, or apostolics, argued that many officials appointed to the Treasury Ministry were former afrancesados or liberals. This claim held considerable truth, as Luis López Ballesteros, the Treasury Minister, prioritized technical expertise over past political affiliations when making appointments. "You see in the Treasury offices a multitude of convinced liberals," one ultra declared in 1825. Three years later, another remarked, "At the Treasury, there’s an order to admit all sorts of birds," implying a lax approach to appointments. By 1830, a third ultra asserted, "The Constitution is already in place at the Treasury."

The ultras saw no need for reform, clinging to what historian Juan Francisco Fuentes describes as "an unrealistic vision of reality." This detachment was evident in their fantastical proposals, such as schemes to reclaim the American empire or a State Council initiative—where ultras held a majority—to auction off leeches for export to address the Treasury's deficit. Fuentes notes, "Ultimately, the key distinction between moderates and ultras lay in the former’s greater grasp of reality, contrasted with the obsessions and fantasies that governed the latter’s actions." The ultras’ figurehead, Don Carlos—brother of King Ferdinand VII and heir to the throne as long as the king remained childless—relied entirely on religion and Providence. In a letter, he wrote, "There is a holy fear of God, and with it come good morals, virtues, peace, tranquility, joy, and everything."

== History ==
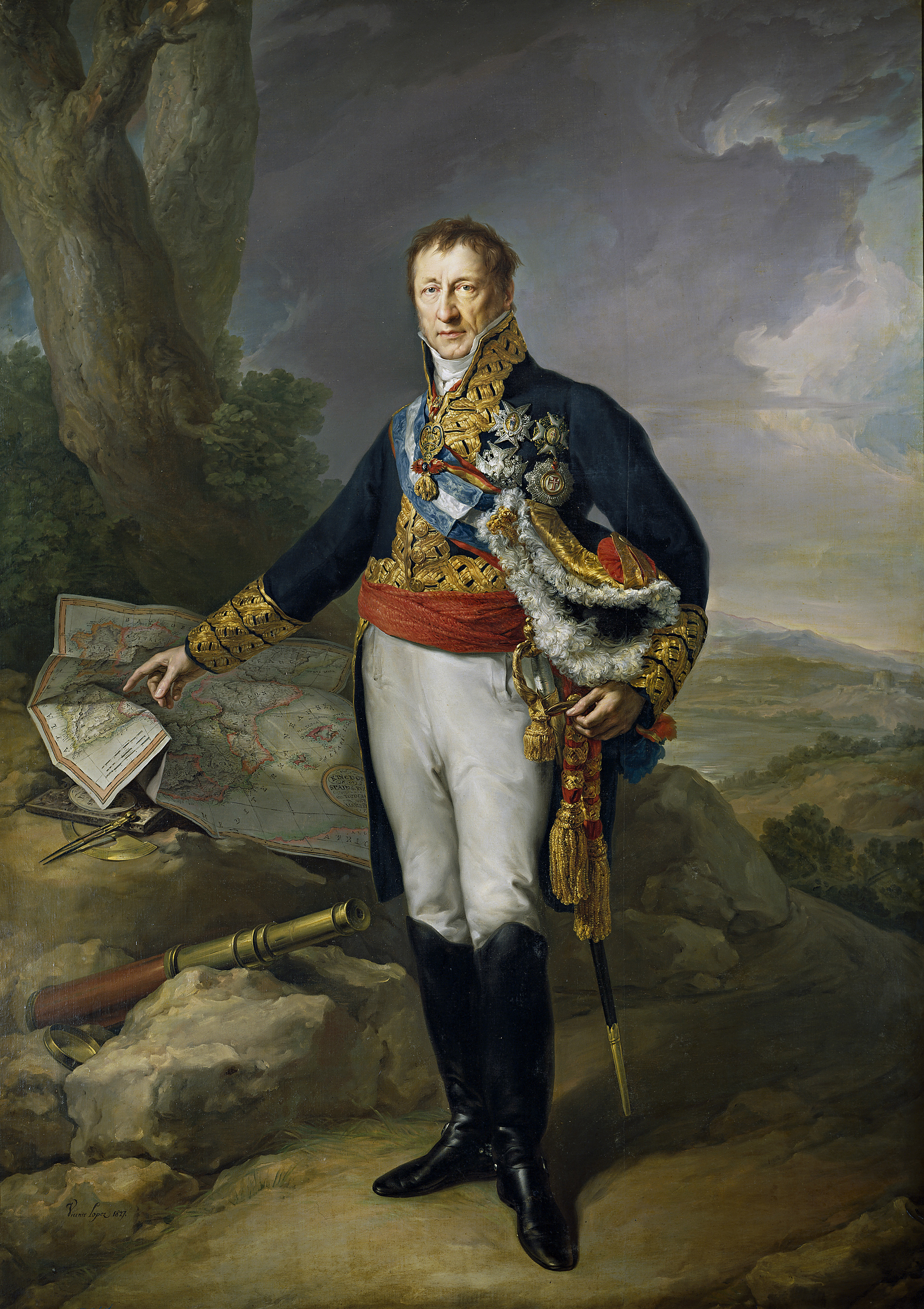
Portrait of Pedro de Alcántara Álvarez de Toledo, Duke of Infantado, by Vicente López Portaña (1827). A prominent ultra, he served as Secretary of State from October 1825 to August 1826 under Ferdinand VII.

The ultras originated among royalists who opposed liberals during the Liberal Triennium’s civil conflict, the Royalist War of 1822–1823. Their influence peaked in the war’s final phase, when power—nominally in Ferdinand VII’s name, though he was deemed "captive" by liberals—shifted to an absolutist regency. Appointed in Madrid in May 1823 by the Duke of Angoulême, commander of the French expeditionary force, this regency aligned with ultra ideology, aiming to establish a theocratic absolute regime rooted in the alliance of throne and altar, with the Inquisition restored as a cornerstone. Their mobilization notably thwarted the Ordinance of Andújar.

Between May and September 1823, ultra-absolutist secret societies, such as the Apostolic Junta and the Exterminaing Angel, emerged or gained prominence. According to Emilio La Parra López, this period solidified "fanatical absolutist groups" who infused Spanish public life with an extremist, clerical "ultra" or "royalist extremism." Their support base included those harmed by liberal policies: artisans struggling in a shifting capitalist economy, peasants burdened by low prices and taxes, urban poor, disbanded royalist militias and their commanders left destitute, and clergy—especially religious orders—who saw themselves as liberalism’s chief victims that waged an unrelenting war against it.

This analysis is shared by Josep Fontana: "Concerning the question of the participation of the rural and urban popular masses alongside the apostolics, we could say that a good proportion of the groups that collaborated were made up of people left out of the economic transformations that were underway at the time: craftsmen out of work because of competition from modern industrial production (like the women who had been put out of work by machines in Ripoll), peasants ruined by the agrarian crisis, “proletarians”, as they were called at the time, who missed the assistance to the poor that the old order guaranteed them. [...] What they had in common with the Church and the Ancien Régime was their enmity towards the liberal bourgeois order, which had failed to provide answers to their problems. But if they accepted the political rhetoric of the counter-revolution, they tinged it with populist connotations setting the poor against the rich"

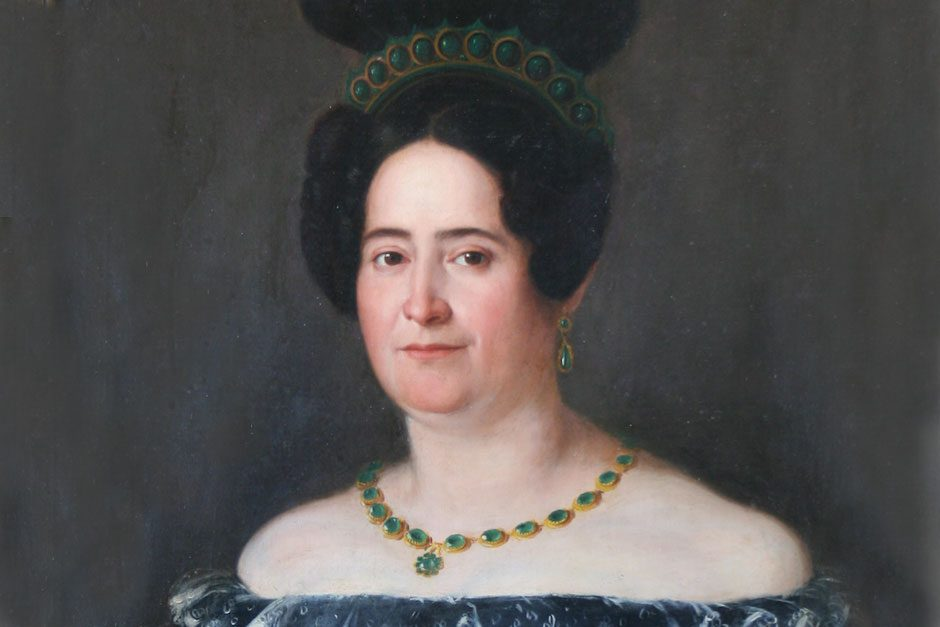
Maria Teresa of Braganza, Princess of Beira. She and her sister Maria Francisca of Braganza, wife of Don Carlos, were key instigators of the "apostolic party" from the Royal Palace of Madrid, later evolving into the Carlist party.

The "apostolic party" solidified between December 1823 and 1824, reacting to Ferdinand VII’s appointment of a "reformist" absolutist government under European pressure. Against these moderates, the ultras waged a covert civil war via secret societies and conspirators, forcing Ferdinand’s administrations to navigate threats from both liberals and ultras. Though these societies occasionally collaborated, they lacked centralized coordination, contributing to their rebellions’ failures. They exaggerated tales of a controlling "Apostolic Junta" to intimidate foes and inflate their strength—rumors even credible observers like French ambassador Boislecomte nearly believed. Nonetheless, they enjoyed robust backing from the Spanish Church—hostile to liberalism since the Cortes of Cádiz—and the Royalist Volunteers, their armed wing.

Within the royal family, the ultras were championed by Don Carlos, his wife Maria Francisca of Braganza, and her sister, Princess of Beira, whose palace quarters served as the apostolic party’s hub. Don Carlos warned Ferdinand in July 1826 of his perilous course, writing, "Consider that [your advisors] won’t thank you, for they’ve already seized the neighbor’s house [Portugal’s constitutional regime]. You could lose your crown, perhaps your life, and with you all the good and our holy religion." The king’s sister, Carlota Joaquina, married to John VI of Portugal, also backed the ultras. The former, committed to the Portuguese absolutist cause embodied by her son Don Miguel, wrote to Ferdinand VII from Lisbon: "What I am doing and will do is ask God to open your eyes so that you don't rush yourself and everyone else”. She also asked him to reconsider the complicated situation he was putting himself in if he did not open his eyes and change his system". She also urged him to do away with all liberals.

== See also ==
- Ultra-royalist
- Ultra-Tories

== Bibliography ==
- Bahamonde, Ángel; Martínez, Jesús Antonio (2011). Historia de España. Siglo XIX (in Spanish). Madrid: Cátedra. ISBN 978-84-376-1049-8.
- Fontana, Josep (1979). La crisis del Antiguo Régimen, 1808-1833 (in Spanish). Barcelona: Crítica. ISBN 84-7423-084-5.
- Fontana, Josep (2006). De en medio del tiempo. La segunda restauración española, 1823-1834 (in Spanish). Barcelona: Crítica. ISBN 978-84-8432-792-9.
- Fontana, Josep (2007). La época del liberalismo (in Spanish). Volume 6 of Historia de España, edited by Josep Fontana and Ramón Villares. Barcelona-Madrid: Crítica/Marcial Pons. ISBN 978-84-8432-876-6.
- Fuentes, Juan Francisco (2007). El fin del Antiguo Régimen (1808-1868). Política y sociedad (in Spanish). Madrid: Síntesis. ISBN 978-84-975651-5-8.
- La Parra López, Emilio (2018). Fernando VII. Un rey deseado y detestado (in Spanish). Barcelona: Tusquets. ISBN 978-84-9066-512-1.
