= Royalist Volunteers =

Spanish militia

Royalist Volunteer Corps
- Cuerpo de Voluntarios Realistas
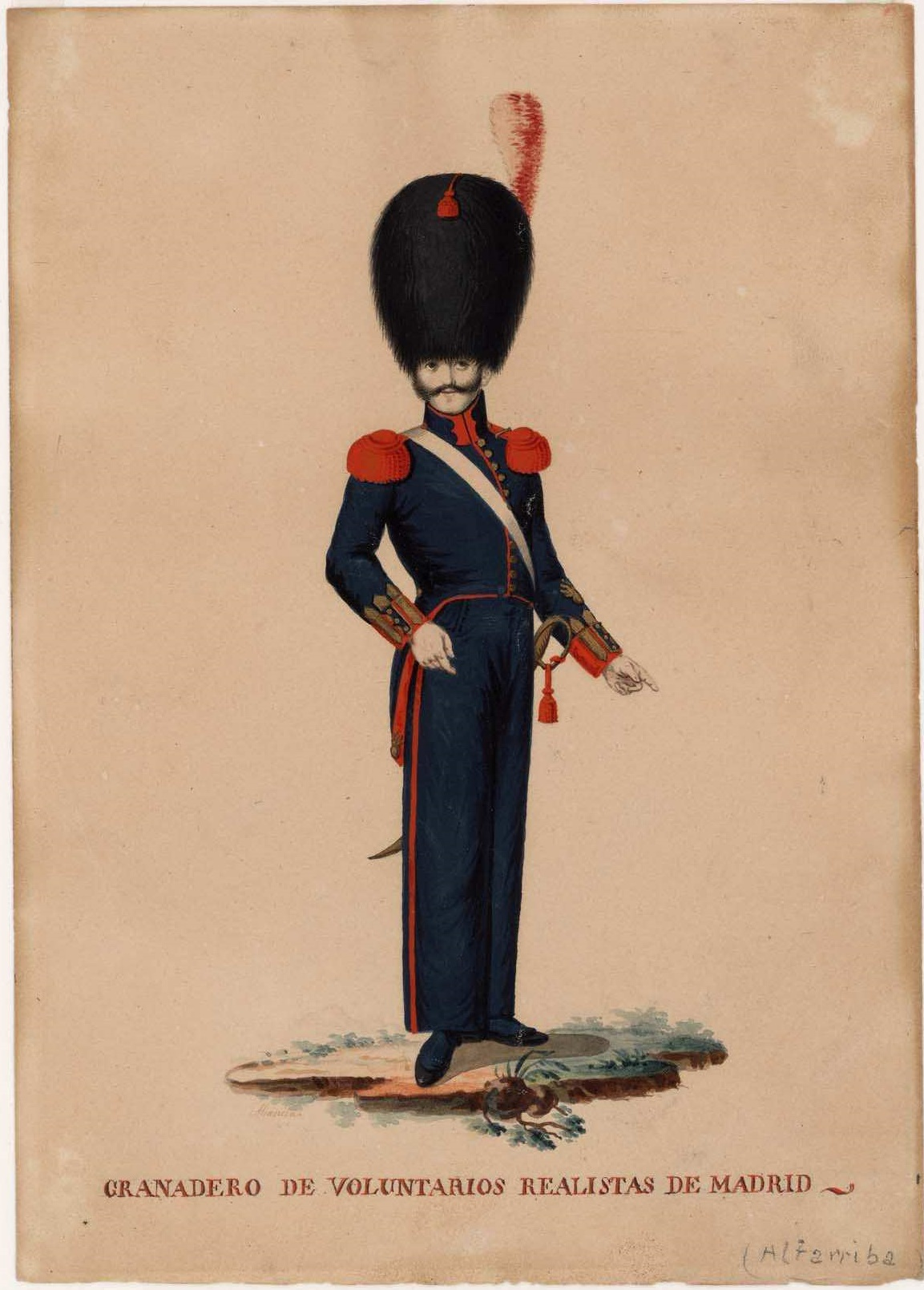
- A grenadier of the Royalist Volunteers of Madrid
- Active: 1823-1833
- Country: Spain
- Branch: Spanish militia
- Size: 70,000 (1824); 284,000 (1832)

The Royalist Volunteer Corps was a Spanish militia raised on 10 June 1823 by the regency appointed in May by the Duke of Angoulême, the commander-in-chief of the French army which invaded Spain in April to overthrow the Liberal Triennium and restore Ferdinand VII as an absolute monarch. Thousands of Spanish royalists who had served alongside the French army during its invasion along with royalist civilians in Spain joined the new militia, which engaged in counter-revolutionary violence in territory under the regency's control. This led to Angoulême issuing an ordinance in August which forbade any further such violence, though in practice it was often ineffective.

When Ferdinand VII was fully restored as an absolute monarch on 1 October 1823 and restored the absolute monarchy for a second time, he did not disband the Royalist Volunteer Corps and continued to use it as an instrument of state repression. Most of its members were radical absolutists or ultraroyalists, and the militia was described as the "armed wing of ultra-royalism". It served as an absolutist counterpart to the liberal National Militia established by the Spanish Constitution of 1812 and expanded during the Liberal Triennium. The Royalist Volunteer Corps was officially disbanded in 1833 following Ferdinand VII's death and many of its former members joined the forces of the Infante Carlos María Isidro of Spain during the First Carlist War.

== Origins ==
When the invasion of the Hundred Thousand Sons of Saint Louis began on the 7th of April 1823, entering Spain through the Basque provinces, the three Basque Councils created bodies of native or armed countrymen, made up of volunteers, responsible for maintaining order and pursuing the liberals. They refused to be subject to the authority of the Captain General—in the Basque Country, as in Navarre, the royalist volunteer corps would not be formally constituted, its functions being taken over by the armed countrymen—. At the same time, in the town of Ezcaray in La Rioja, a royal volunteer corps was formed, based on the model of the Liberal National Militia, which grew to three companies. At the beginning of May, the Captain General of Old Castile praised the town for the actions of its members and approved its provisional regulations. These regulations would form the basis of the rules for the formation of the Royalist Volunteer Corps, published by the Regency on 10 June 1823.

== History ==
=== Foundation ===
According to the Regency's order of 10 June 1823, the Royalist Volunteers would act as a local police force under the orders of the corregidores and municipalities, and under the supreme authority of the Captain General. Their mission was to maintain order, patrol, guard and intervene "in fires, quarrels and other events that might cause popular disorder". The historian Josep Fontana highlighted the contradiction between the creation of the Royalist Volunteers and the creation, two days earlier, of the Superintendence of Public Surveillance, whose purpose was to "prevent and avoid all excesses". From the outset, the responsibilities of the two institutions overlapped, leading to frequent complaints from the police that the volunteers were making arrests and issuing safe-conducts on their own authority. The historian Emilio La Parra López noted that the Regency created the Corps "by taking advantage of the groups that had taken up arms against constitutionalism, with the dual aim of waging war against the constitutional system and excluding any negotiations that might establish a representative regime in Spain similar to that in France. In other words, the aim was to eliminate the Liberals".

The Regency's order stated that the Royalist Volunteers would continue to operate "until His Majesty deems it appropriate to decide on measures for the internal security of his cities, or until the Regency of the Kingdom deems it just to cease their operations". When Ferdinand VII regained absolute power on 1 October 1823, he did not disband the corps because "without an army entirely loyal to absolutism, and with French troops stationed at strategic points throughout the territory, the volunteers were the only independent armed force on which to rely to maintain the new regime".

=== Conflict with the "Reformist" Government over the Regulation ===
The government tried to control the Realist Volunteers, who had become a parallel power. At the end of February 1824, the Secretary of War, José de la Cruz, issued a decree stating that the time had come to subject the volunteers to a central authority and a "monarchical order" (in order to avoid the mistakes of the National Militia under Liberalism, which had taken it upon itself to judge the actions of its own rulers, becoming their censors and judges and ultimately turning into a "permanent instrument of armed conspiracy"). In order to avoid "confusing the social classes", as the Liberals had done, the regulation required that volunteers be people with "income, industries, a trade or a respectable and known way of life", excluding "day labourers and all those who could not support themselves and their families during the days of service in their city". He added that this rule also applied to "those already admitted under these circumstances", meaning that they could no longer belong to the corps, whose numbers were also limited to "one volunteer for every seventy-five souls". As for the requirements for candidates for leadership positions (the city councils would submit a shortlist to the captains general, who would appoint them), they had to "own significant real estate... or possess a noble lineage inherited from their ancestors and maintained with dignity".

The Realist volunteers rejected the decree, so much so that at the end of March a document purporting to be from the king was sent to the Realist leaders in the name of the general commander of the volunteers, José Aymerich. This document urged them not to comply with the regulation and to rebel against the captains general who were trying to enforce it ("My wish is that you inform the Realist volunteers under your command and all those in the provinces through your channels that they should not comply with it. On the contrary, they should assemble and work together to free me from the hands of the French ['the authors of this attack'] and to resist with force the captains general who are trying to enforce it"). The situation became so serious that the General Superintendent of Police denounced in La Gaceta de Madrid that the circular was false. Aymerich also claimed that it was a fabrication by the Liberals. However, as the French ambassador wrote in a report to his government, "almost all the Realist volunteers refused to obey the order to disband".

Eventually the government relented and the order was never enforced. This was confirmed by the French ambassador in Madrid, who stated that the corps of Realist Volunteers consisted mainly of a "mass of proletarians". General Cruz was replaced by Aymerich, who quickly issued a royal decree on 6 September instructing the captains general to seek funds to provide "uniforms and other clothing for those who cannot afford them due to financial failure". The decree also stated that the only requirement for new recruits was that they should be "staunch lovers of our Lord the King".

In June 1826, a new ordinance was passed stating that the only condition for joining the corps was to have a 'respectable way of life'. Day labourers were specifically mentioned, as Article Ten stated that city councils and officials should "give preference to the Realist Volunteers, especially day labourers, in all available work in the cities, if the circumstances are equal". A general inspection of the corps was also created, making the Realist Volunteers independent of the army, no longer dependent on the captains general. Their ultimate goal was defined as "to fight revolutionaries and conspiracies and to wipe out revolution and conspiracy". They thus achieved their highest aspiration: to be commanded by an Inspector General appointed by the King and answerable only to him, bypassing the Secretary of War and the government. This greatly increased the power of the Realist Volunteers.

=== Development ===
The Realist Volunteers apparently experienced spectacular growth, rising from around 70,000 members in 1824 to 284,000 in 1832. However, almost half of them lacked arms and uniforms, and their distribution was very uneven. Three-quarters of them were concentrated in Old Castile, New Castile, Galicia, Valencia, Murcia and Granada, while regions such as Catalonia had barely more than ten thousand volunteers. As the historian Josep Fontana notes, "the status of volunteer offered its mostly humble members social incentives, a source of income that allowed unemployed day labourers to survive, and a preferential option for local jobs". This view is shared by Emilio La Parra, who notes that "belonging to this corps meant loyalty to the absolute regime and, for many, the hope of securing employment, which facilitated the rapid growth of its membership". According to Fontana, this growth was also fuelled by a "populist dream that led [the realists] to look back at the recovery of an idyllic past that never existed", as was the case for many peasants and artisans. "The proletarian who joined the ranks of the realist volunteers became more important than the wealthy of the village, and could even intimidate them. Realism at least gave him a salary, weapons, some power and a new sense of dignity".

The role of the Realist Volunteers was to complement the institutionalised repression of the liberals, but in many areas they came to exercise de facto power. This is evidenced by a document on the Realist Volunteers in Cifuentes (Guadalajara), which states that they "wanted to live at the expense of the rich, whom they insulted and threatened, calling them negros", meaning liberals. A police report from 1825 confirmed that "there is a general emigration to France of all the landowners and wealthy people of the Basque provinces, because they cannot bear the insults, harassment and abuse of the Realist volunteers and the lower classes of the city". As the historian Juan Francisco Fuentes has pointed out, "a large part of the political and social violence during the Ominous Decade must be attributed to the often uncontrollable actions of the Realist Volunteers". He added: "This social and political radicalism, which combined hatred of the rich with hatred of liberals, made the Realist Volunteers a constant source of agitation against the government, which many of them accused of complicity with the negros [a derogatory term used by absolutists to refer to liberals]. Emilio La Parra also stressed that they carried out "arbitrary arrests" and in many cases "disobeyed the authorities or even usurped their powers". He stated: "In effect, they acted as the armed wing of the people against the reformism of the moderate [absolutist] ministers". In September 1824, the General Superintendent of Police, Mariano Rufino González, complained of "the reports I receive from everywhere that between the police and other companies there is nothing but odious rivalries, unfortunate clashes, open and scandalous opposition". Meanwhile, the bishops warned the government of the dangers posed by the "heated and possibly bloodthirsty zeal" of the volunteers.

The Realist Volunteers were under the command of local city councils, which were responsible for providing funds for their maintenance and supervising their recruitment. As the historian Josep Fontana has pointed out, "local oligarchies preferred these nearby forces, which they could easily manage, to a centralised state police".

The involvement of the Realist Volunteers in the War of the Aggrieved (1827) and their uncontrolled actions gradually led the Crown and the local institutions to distrust them and to consider disbanding them, especially when they sided with Don Carlos in the succession dispute at the end of the reign of Ferdinand VII. As the Marquis of Las Amarillas noted in 1832, "the King wanted to keep them, but the interests of his daughter's cause advised that they be weakened, if not destroyed". The Corps was organised into 486 infantry battalions, 20 artillery companies, 52 cavalry squadrons and a few sapper companies.

== See also ==
- National Militia (Spain)
- Partidas realistas

== Bibliography ==
- Butrón Prida, Gonzalo (2004). "Pueblo y elites en la crisis del absolutismo: los voluntarios realistas". Spagna Contemporanea (in Spanish) (25): 1–20. ISSN 1121-7480.
- Fontana, Josep (2006). De en medio del tiempo. La segunda restauración española, 1823-1834 (in Spanish). Barcelona: Crítica. ISBN 978-84-8432-792-9.
- —; Villares, Ramón (2007). La época del liberalismo. Historia de España (in Spanish). Vol. 6. Barcelona-Madrid: Crítica/Marcial Pons. ISBN 978-84-8432-876-6.
- Fuentes, Juan Francisco (2007). El fin del Antiguo Régimen (1808-1868). Política y sociedad (in Spanish). Madrid: Síntesis. ISBN 978-84-975651-5-8.
- Gallego García, José Antonio (2018). "El cuerpo de voluntarios realistas (I)". Cuadernos del Bicentenario (in Spanish) (34): 79–110. ISSN 1887-2581.
- La Parra López, Emilio (2018). Fernando VII. Un rey deseado y detestado (in Spanish). XXX Premio Comillas de Historia, Biografía y Memorias. Barcelona: Tusquets. ISBN 978-84-9066-512-1.
- Río Aldaz, Ramón del (1992). "La formación del Cuerpo de Voluntarios Realistas en Navarra (1823-1828)". Estudios históricos (in Spanish). 2. Diputación Foral de Gipuzkoa, Museo Zumalakarregi: 209–237. ISBN 978-84-7907-015-1.
- Suárez Verdeguer, Federico (1956). "Los Cuerpos de Voluntarios Realistas: notas para su estudio". Anuario de historia del derecho español (in Spanish) (26): 47–88. ISSN 0304-4319.
