= War of the Aggrieved =

Civil uprising in Spain between March and October 1827

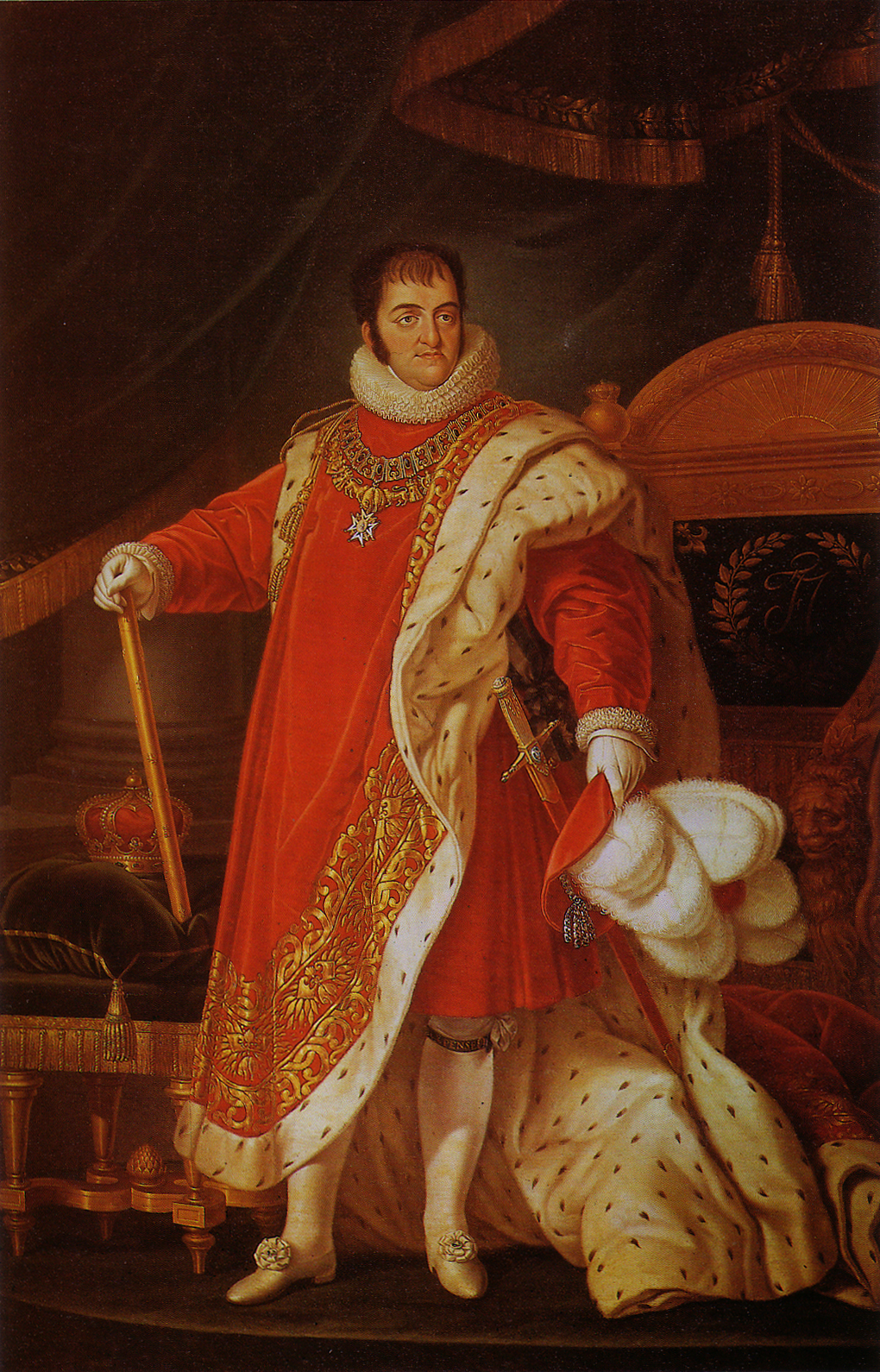
Fernando VII, painting by Luis de la Cruz y Ríos.

The War of the Aggrieved (in Catalan: Guerra dels Malcontents, in Spanish: Guerra de los Agraviados) was an "ultra-Absolutist" uprising that took place between March and October 1827 in Catalonia and, to a smaller extent, in Valencia, Aragon, the Basque Country and Andalusia. The aggrieved (in Spanish: agraviados) rose up against the absolutist "reformist" government that supposedly had "kidnapped" King Ferdinand VII. The insurrectionists, mostly peasants and artisans, mobilized between 20,000 and 30,000 men in Catalonia and by mid-September they occupied most of the Principality. The leaders of the rebellion were former royalist officers of the "army of faith" that had fought with the French army of the Hundred Thousand Sons of St. Louis that invaded Spain to put an end to the constitutional regime of the Triennium. To put an end to the rebellion Fernando VII had to go to Catalonia to demonstrate that he enjoyed full freedom and in this way the rebels laid down their arms.

This revolt constituted the most direct antecedent of the Carlist wars.

== Background ==
Just as the Liberal Triennium (1820-1823) saw the split of the liberals between "moderates" and "exalted", during the Ominous Decade (1823-1833) it was the absolutists who were divided between "reformist" absolutists —partisans of "softening" absolutism following the warnings of the Quadruple Alliance and the restored Bourbon France— and the "ultras" or "apostolic" absolutists who defended the complete restoration of absolutism, including the reestablishment of the Inquisition which King Ferdinand VII, under pressure from the European powers, had not reinstated after its abolition by the liberals during the Triennium. The "ultras" or "apostolics", also called "ultra-royalist" or "ultra-absolutists", had in the king's brother, Carlos María Isidro de Borbón —heir to the throne because Fernando VII after three marriages had not managed to have descendants— as their main supporter, that is why they were also sometimes called "Carlists". After the insurrections of Joaquín Capapé (1824) and Jorge Bessières (1825), the most serious conflict that the ultra-absolutists carried out was the War of the Aggrieved of 1827.

== History ==
=== Uprising ===
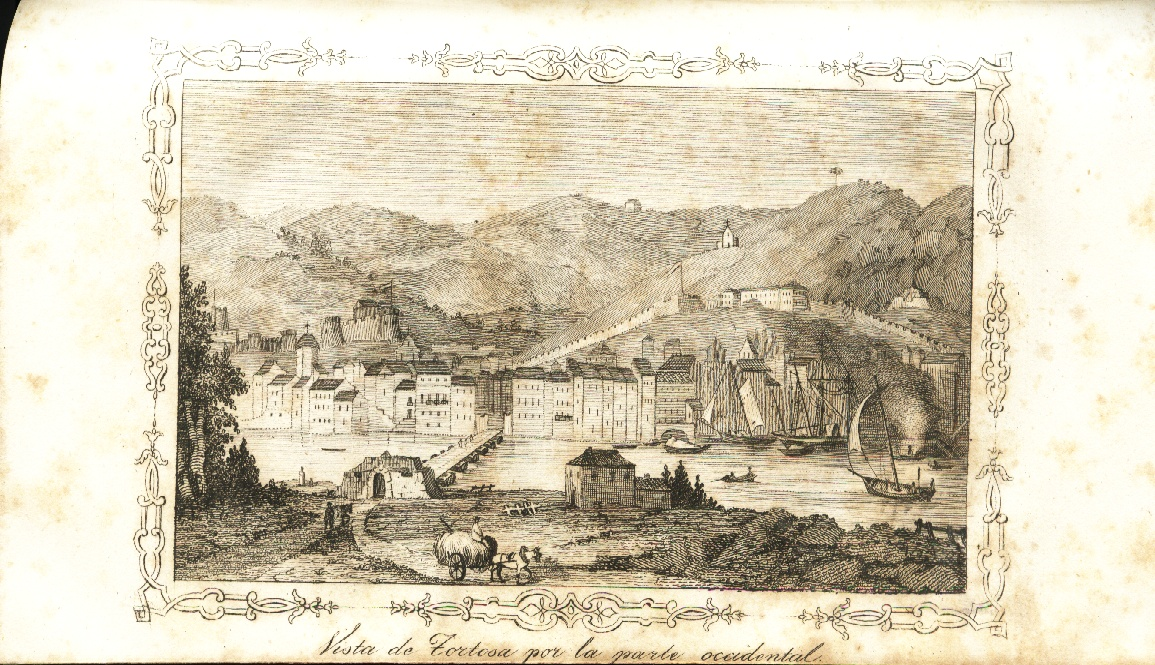
Tortosa, capital of the Terres de l'Ebre, where the first "aggrieved" parties were formed.

In March 1827, the parties led by Colonel Trillas and Captain Salvador Llovet were formed in Terres de l'Ebre. They failed in their attempt to seize Tortosa in the early morning of the 12th of that month and were quickly defeated. Trillas and Llovet would be shot at the beginning of April. According to the French consul in Barcelona, these parties carried "a flag in which King Ferdinand is seen upside down and an exterminating angel who steps on a black man [a liberal] and pierces him with his sword. Their war cry is 'Long live King Charles V, long live the Holy Inquisition, out with the French'". According to an official report, this was a protest by officers "of whom it was said that the qualification of their services in the royalist ranks had dissatisfied them, as well as the delay with which they received their pay". On April 1 Narcís Abrés revolted near Girona, spreading the rebellion throughout the north of Catalonia.

The main scenario of the war was Central Catalonia, made up of the regions of Bages (Manresa capital), Berguedá (Berga capital), Moianès (Moià capital), Solsonés (Solsona capital), Osona (Vic capital) and the north of Noia (Igualada capital), and the neighboring regions of Segarra (Cervera capital) and La Garrocha (Olot capital), as well as Alto Campo (Valls capital) and Bajo Campo (Reus capital).

The uprising reached its peak in summer, "following the evolution of the harvesting work, at the end of which many day laborers joined parties that paid a good salary, which shows that the organizers had abundant resources", said Josep Fontana. A French commander informed his government that the rebels "have lithographic presses and distribute proclamations; the officers carry appointments and printed instructions, and receive a salary that does not come exclusively from the contributions they collect". On July 31 Josep Busoms ('Jep dels Estanys') one of the leaders of those who were beginning to be known as "aggrieved" royalists, launched a proclamation from Berga ―Busoms attributed to himself the title of Count of Berga―:

No, Spaniards, no; these are not our complaints and clamors against our King; neither are we trying to make the Government resign in any way. Our clamors are directed against that infernal rabble that after having been unfaithful sons to the Motherland... have managed to seize the jobs and destinies, to suck with abundance the blood of those that before they could not immolate.

As Josep Fontana has warned, "the slogans in favor of the infant Don Carlos were now abandoned, and the uprising was justified with the argument that the king was imprisoned in the court, in the power of the Masons and the revolutionaries, who were the ones who really governed". "The purpose of our glorious alarm is that our beloved monarch Ferdinand VII be freed from several Masonic individuals who with cunning and shrewdness have managed to keep or seize the government", proclaimed Josep Clarà, one of the leaders of the rebellion, in Vic. By mid-September the insurrectionists already occupied most of the Principality of Catalonia. The leaders of the rebellion were former royalist officers of the "army of faith" that had fought with the French army of the Hundred Thousand Sons of St. Louis that invaded Spain to put an end to the constitutional regime of the Triennium. In a French report of August 1827 it was said:

Since last March Catalonia has been in the throes of disturbances which, having begun partial and isolated, have later taken on a certain increase and are developing in such a threatening manner that it is to be feared that very soon they will cover the entire province. [...] At the beginning the cries of the rebels were: "Long live Charles the Fifth, long live the Inquisition, death to the blacks [the liberals], out with the French". As they moved from the south to the north, the sedition changed them and now they are: "Long live the absolute king, long live the Inquisition, out with the police and the sectarians". [...] They used to be called "Carlists"; now they are called "aggrieved royalists". The triumph of religion, the reestablishment of the Inquisition and the death of the blacks: here is what is common to the factious of the south and the north, those of yesterday and those of today.

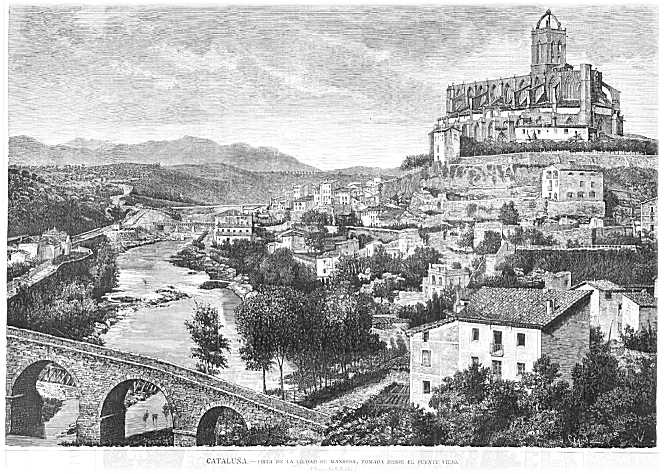
Manresa, capital of the rebellion of the "aggrieved".

On August 28 they established in Manresa, taken days before and turned from then on into the capital of the rebellion, a "Provisional Superior Board of government of the Principality", integrated by four members (two clerics and two seculars) and presided by Colonel Agustín Saperes, called "Caragol", who in a proclamation of September 9 insisted on the fidelity to King Ferdinand. The proclamation, addressed to the "good Spaniards", began by saying: "The time has come for the meritorious royalists to re-enter into a fight more bloody perhaps than that of the twentieth year". Then they took the towns of Vic, Cervera, Solsona, Berga, Olot, Valls and Reus ―the latter by Joan Rafí Vidal, accompanied by a group of bandits led by "Padre Puñal"― and laid siege to Gerona, where they would maintain for a month. They edited in Manresa from September 4 the newspaper El Catalán realista in whose number of the 6th of that month appears the slogan of the insurrection: "Long live Religion, long live the absolute King, long live the Inquisition, death to the Police, death to Masonism and all the ungodly sect". To legitimize the rebellion they alleged that King Ferdinand VII was "kidnapped" by the government and therefore their objective was "to sustain the sovereignty of our beloved King Ferdinand", although cheers were given to "Carlos Quinto", the king's younger brother and heir to the throne, who shared the "ultra" ideology. A French report recounted the impact the rebellion was having in Catalonia:

A general agitation reigns throughout the province. Communications offer less and less security every day, commercial operations have largely ceased and industry, which needs peace to develop, is in a total languor. The exchanges between the coast and the interior are at a standstill: everything is stagnation, and only the large towns enjoy tranquility.

=== Response from the government ===
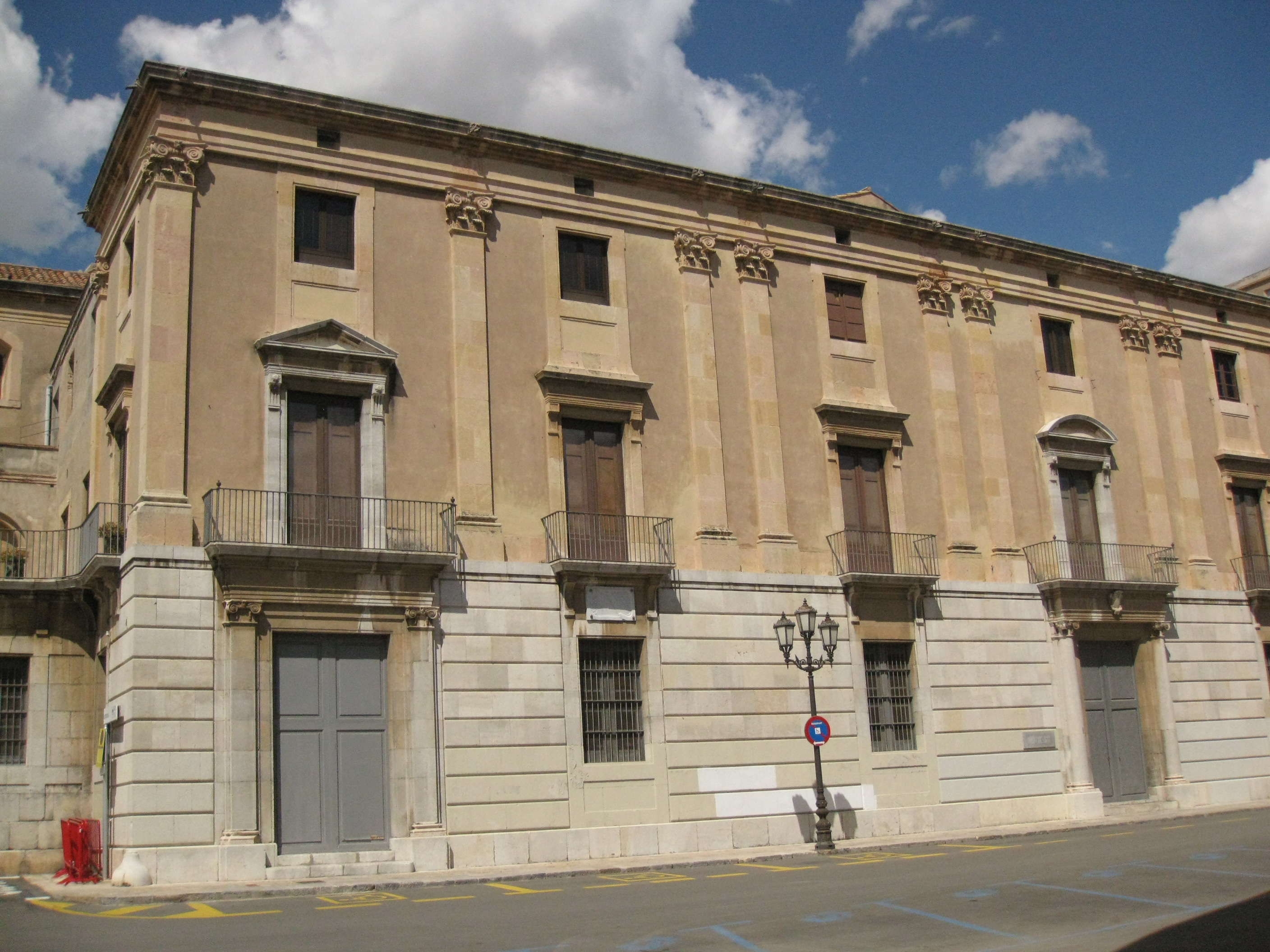
Archbishop's Palace of Tarragona. There Ferdinand VII signed the Manifesto to put an end to the rebellion of the "aggrieved".

==== Ferdinand VII’s trip to Catalonia and repression. ====
Faced with the magnitude of the rebellion and its extension outside Catalonia, the government decided to send an army to the Principality, with the notorious absolutist Count of Spain at the head as the new captain general, replacing the Marquis of Campo Sagrado, and endowed with broad powers ―such as the power to judge the rebels in court martial without taking into account the jurisdiction of the military and clergy―, and, at the same time, to organize a visit of the king to Catalonia (where he arrived, via Valencia, at the end of September accompanied by only one minister, the "ultra" Francisco Tadeo Calomarde) to dispel any doubt about his supposed lack of freedom and to exhort the rebels to lay down their arms (the official reason was: "to examine for myself the causes that have produced the disturbances in Catalonia"). It has been affirmed that the idea that Ferdinand VII traveled to Catalonia came from the rebels themselves, who were eager to make the reasons for their rebellion known to the king personally, since they were convinced that as soon as he knew them he would change his government and policy (thus it was assured in El Catalán Realista: "that if we have the joy of seeing the King, and that with frankness and free of Masonic ties we can speak the truth to him, everything will be calm..."). On September 28 a Manifesto of Fernando VII was made public from the Archbishop's Palace of Tarragona in which he said:

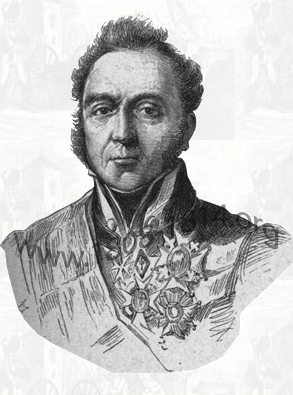
Portrait of General Carlos de España de Cominges de Couserans y de Foix, Count of Spain, who led the harsh repression against the "aggrieved".

I am already among you as I offered you by my Decree of the 18th of this month [of September]; but know that as a Father I am going to speak for the last time to the seditious ones the language of clemency, still ready to listen to the claims that they address to me from their homes, if they obey my voice; [...] You see disproved with my coming the vain and absurd pretexts with which up to now they have tried to coax their rebellion. Neither am I oppressed, nor are the people who deserve my confidence conspiring against our Holy Religion, nor is the Motherland in danger, nor has the honor of my Crown been compromised, nor is my Sovereign authority being undermined by anyone.

The effect of the Manifesto was immediate and provoked the surrender or the disbandment of many of the insurgents. A few days later Manresa, Vic, Olot and Cervera surrendered without resistance. Although the rebellion would continue for some months, by mid-October it could be considered over. During this time, as Juan Francisco Fuentes has pointed out, "the repression acted relentlessly against the rebels, with summary executions and arrests of suspects both in Catalonia and in the rest of Spain, where the uprising had many supporters". The repression in Catalonia was directed by the Count of Spain, "an unbalanced character", according to Josep Fontana, who also extended it to the liberals, after the abandonment of Catalonia by the French troops that until then had protected them. The king, upon learning of the brutal methods that the Count of Spain was using, commented: "He may be crazy, but for these things there is no alternative".

"The Catalans would take time to forget the harshness practiced by the Count of Spain in the repression of the rebels", said Emilio La Parra López. Throughout the month of November the leaders of the revolt were shot (with their backs turned as traitors), among them Joan Rafí Vidal and Narcís Abrés. In February 1828 it was the turn of Josep Busoms, shot in Olot. Hundreds of "aggrieved" were condemned to prison sentences or deported to Ceuta, and the most committed ecclesiastics were imprisoned in convents far away from Catalonia ―this was also the case of the famous "ultra" Josefina de Comerford, great sympathizer of the revolt, who was confined in a convent in Seville―.

== Actors of the rebellion ==
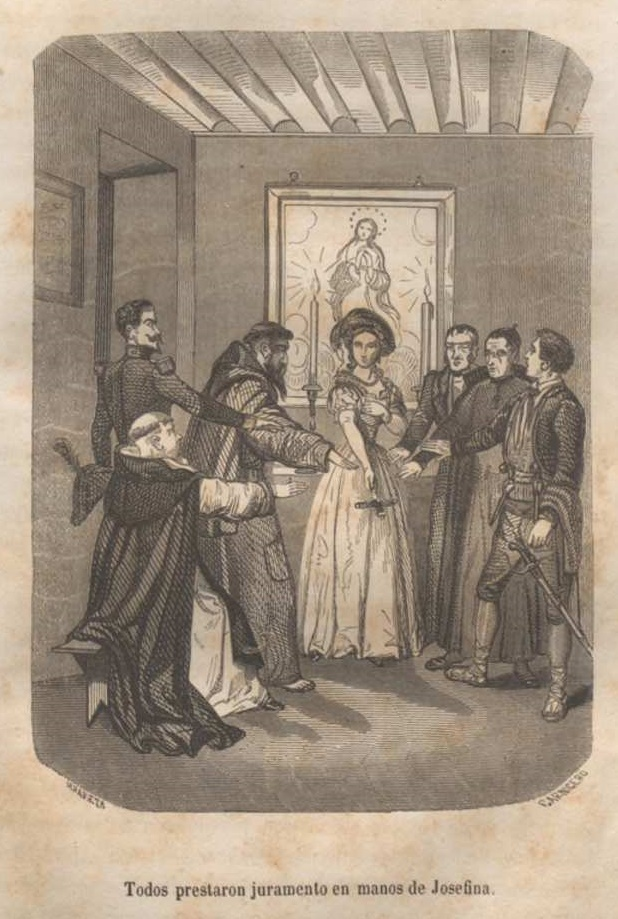
Illustration by Vicente Urrabieta and Carnicero for the novel by Francisco José Orellana, El conde de España o La inquisición militar, Madrid, Librería de León Pablo, 1856. The caption of the image reads: " Everyone took the oath in the hands of Josefina" in reference to Josefina de Comerford, considered to be one of the instigators of the uprising of the aggrieved. In a report it was said that "desirous of occupying a place among the celebrated women, guided by her exalted and romantic imagination, she becomes a tribune of the people, excites the disturbance, admits the conspirators into her house, directs their plans and encourages them with her own bravery".

Juan Francisco Fuentes has pointed out the coincidences of the uprising of the "aggrieved" with the previous "ultras" attempts: "the protagonism of the most radical clergy, of the royalist volunteers and of the "unlimited officers" [chiefs of royalist parties that were not incorporated into the Army after the end of the constitutional regime in 1823], who acted at the head of their guerrilla parties, reorganized for the occasion. Of great importance again was the uneasiness that the economic crisis provoked in broad popular sectors, which actively participated in the rebellion against the government". The latter has also been emphasized by Rafael Sánchez Mantero: "The participants [in the rebellion] were humble peasants and simple people who complained about the abuses of the administration and the arbitrariness of the Treasury. The allegations of an administration in the hands of Freemasons and blacks [liberals] were frequent in the ranks of the aggrieved. This uneasiness was taken advantage of by the most exalted elements of royalism to attempt rebellion." Ángel Bahamonde and Jesús A. Martínez agree: "These were social strata linked to the peasant world and to the world of trades in decline (craftsmen in rural communities and small urban centers), sectors resistant to the reforms..., to which were added the clergy, and officials linked to voluntary work... Popular layers that have the legitimate King as a referent to maintain the stability of a world of a stratified structure that is running out of steam...". Josep Fontana underlines "the close relationship that exists between peasant unrest and ultra revolt" and quotes a report of the General Superintendence of Police that said the following:

The population of the mountains is solely agricultural; the plain and the ports are manufacturers and merchants. [...] The peasants, simpler and less susceptible to be seduced by the ambition of false theories, have always remained attached to the old monarchy. Having seen their fields ravaged and their crops devoured by the constitutional armies, they have a just and implacable hatred for them. [...] From among these men comes the greater part of the royalist volunteers of the province, and their hostile intentions against the population of the plain, composed of rich manufacturers and merchants, increase from day to day, because they always have employment and enjoy a pleasant existence, while the sad workers of the mountains suffer the most horrible misery.

=== Role of the Clergy ===
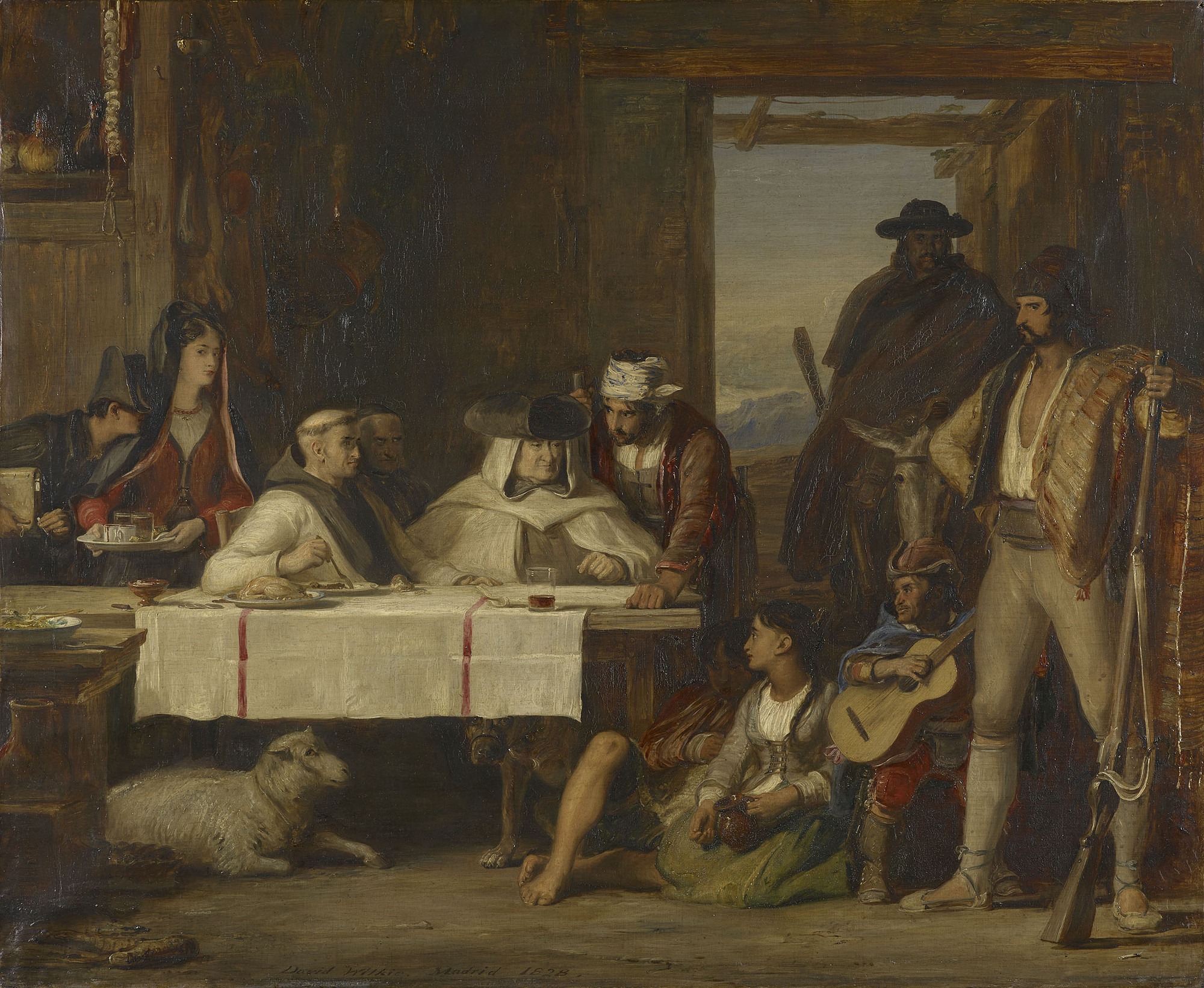
The Spanish Posada by David Wilkie, who was in Spain between October 1827 and June 1828. It represents the meeting in an inn of the command of a guerrilla group (of the "aggrieved"?) among whom is a friar.

The rebellion had counted on the support of the Catalan clergy, who had encouraged, legitimized and financed it, but as soon as the king arrived in Tarragona they went over to the opposite side and almost all the bishops condemned the "aggrieved" and made appeals for them to lay down their arms. Some clergymen tried to justify themselves by blaming Freemasonry. This was the case of the professors of the University of Cervera who published the following poem:

The crafty Freemason

made believe that the Solio was in danger,

and the angry royalists

prepare the rifle; but seeing that he was wrong,

and the sovereign is free,

soon leaves the weapons in his hand.

One of the leaders of the revolt, Narcís Abrés, Pixola or el carnicer, denounced in a proclamation of September 27 the change of position of the Catalan bishops on the revolt:

It is time now to break my silence to vindicate myself... from the calumny with which all the bishops of the Principality accuse us in their respective pastorals, attributing our heroic deeds to be the work of Jacobin sectarians... Some of these same prelates know well that [those] who are now called denaturalized ringleaders made it clear to us that the king had become a sectarian, and that, if we did not want to see religion destroyed, the infant Don Carlos should be elevated to the throne. [...] And what have they done? They have left us in the lurch without coming to our aid those who were in agreement, because they see the danger and do not want to expose [sic] themselves to losing their rich perks and destinies. [...] Here you have discovered the plan of those who vilified us by calling us seduced by the blacks [the liberals].

== Consequences ==
Ángel Bahamonde and Jesús A. Martínez have emphasized that the failure of the "aggrieved" marked "a new course in the royalists". "Feeling defrauded by a legitimate King who represented their principles and who they wanted to defend, the proclivity towards the alternative of the Infante [don Carlos] began to take shape". Josep Fontana had already pointed it out: after the failure of the insurrection "the weight of the action passed to the conspiracies in the court".

=== Ferdinand VII's long journey back to court ===
The king remained in Catalonia until March 9, 1828 ―most of the time he resided in Barcelona, after the French troops had left the city; "in my life I have never seen more people or more enthusiasm", wrote the king about how the people of Barcelona received him and the queen―, then he traveled with Queen Maria Josefa Amalia through Aragon, Navarra and the Basque Country to return to the Palace of La Granja (Segovia) on July 31, 1828, crossing Old Castile. The triumphal entry into Madrid took place on August 11 and the celebrations lasted four days, although it seems that the population showed less enthusiasm than in 1808 or 1814 ―the "ultras" had nothing to celebrate after the defeat of the "aggrieved"―. This long trip of more than ten months has been interpreted by Angel Bahamonde and Jesus A. Martinez "as an act of affirmation of his person", in view of the growing support that his brother Don Carlos was having among the "ultras". Emilio La Parra has pointed out that "Ferdinand VII understood that the prolongation of the trip [started in Catalonia] was an excellent instrument to improve his image at home and abroad... The success with the Catalan rebels could convince him that his presence among his subjects was a very effective instrument, which could only bring him personal benefits". In fact, "the inhabitants of all the towns visited, together with those who came from nearby places for the occasion, received the kings with acclamations and great shows of rejoicing". In the official report of the trip, which included the stay in Catalonia and which was written under Calomarde's supervision, the result obtained by Ferdinand VII was summarized as follows:

He extinguished civil discord, ensured peace, revived industry, garrisoned the squares of his kingdom with [Spanish] troops, punished treason, concealed misdirection and gave reasons for the loyalty and affection of his vassals.

== Debate among historians on the Manifesto of the pure Royalists ==
Since January 1827 a Manifesto of the Federation of the Pure Royalists to the Spaniards circulated clandestinely throughout Spain and was used by the "aggrieved". The historian Julio Aróstegui has questioned the authorship of the Manifesto, signed in Madrid on November 1, 1826 and in which the overthrow of "the stupid and criminal Fernando de Borbón" in favor of his brother was requested, affirming that in the royalist literature the figure of the King had always been saved and that these disqualifications were not proper of them, and he believes that this document could have been elaborated by the exiled liberals to provoke upheavals in the royal family; however, even if the authorship was not royalist, the fact remains that this document was used by them. In it is presented for the first time the idea of double legitimacy, which may have been coined in Portugal and will be invoked by the Spanish Carlists. A distinction is made between the legitimacy of origin (that which corresponds by inheritance) and the legitimacy of exercise; Ferdinand VII must be dethroned, who is legitimate by origin, but not by his exercise, since he does not fulfill the program of government of the pure royalists: this idea will be the one taken up by the "aggrieved".

Ángel Bahamonde and Jesús A. Martínez share Julio Aróstegui's assessment that it is a liberal "provocation", although they recognize that "the proclamation of the infant Carlos as king was not a novelty". "Its terminology and connotations are distanced from royalist writings: it justifies the uprising of 1820, it does not invoke the royalists or the volunteerism but the "honest mass of the Spanish people", and what is truly unprecedented is the attack, with a contemptuous and offensive tone, on the King, when the royalist publication attacked the servants of the King and not his person, always legitimate in his acts. This Manifesto was not royalist, and its authorship can be related from the liberals in exile to groups related to the Portuguese crisis". On March 1, 1827, the Gaceta published a "Royal Order communicated to the Governor of the Council to prosecute those who dispense or retain the infamous libel that is cited". He also shares Aróstegui's assessment, Emilio La Parra López, who affirms that "the Manifesto was not the work of the royalists, nor was there a Federation of Pure Royalists as stated in the title". He points out that it was printed outside Spain and that it was introduced via Gibraltar.

As to Josep Fontana, he has managed to reconstruct the forgery process, whose idea he attributes to the exiled Valencian liberal financier Vicente Bertran de Lis: "Around the month of July [1827], Bertran de Lis was expelled from France at the request of the Spanish government, and settled in Brussels, where with the help of some liberals, he edited the Manifesto, of which it was said that another printing had been made in London and that they intended to distribute it widely throughout Spain. Ramón César de Conti ―an exalted liberal military man who was in the pay of Ferdinand VII's police― was in charge of taking them to Gibraltar and then distributing them along the coast, as far as Barcelona, from a steamboat (on his return he would boast of having influenced the start of the War of the Aggrieved)". On the other hand Fontana also points out that the government also considered it a liberal manipulation. "Calomarde himself [Secretary of the Office of Grace and Justice] denounced in the Gazette this liberal pamphlet, "printed in eighth on four sheets of paper and in foreign handwriting", and described as absurd the supposition that there was a "faction composed of all the classes that have made the most sacrifices for the defense of the legitimate throne and the sovereignty of S. M." ready to dethrone Ferdinand and, even more, that anyone would think that Carlos, "faithful brother and inseparable companion of S.M. in all his misfortunes", could collaborate in this".

== Bibliography ==
- Arnabat, Ramon (1999) [1999]. "Notes sobre l'aixecament dels malcontents, 1827". Butlletí de la Societat Catalana d'Estudis Històrics (in Catalan) (10): 107–128.
- Bahamonde, Ángel; Martínez, Jesús Antonio (2011) [1994]. Historia de España. Siglo XIX (in Spanish) (6th ed.). Madrid: Cátedra. ISBN 978-84-376-1049-8.
- Fontana, Josep (1979). La crisis del Antiguo Régimen, 1808-1833 (in Spanish). Barcelona: Crítica. ISBN 84-7423-084-5.
- — (2006). De en medio del tiempo. La segunda restauración española, 1823-1834 (in Spanish). Barcelona: Crítica. ISBN 978-84-8432-792-9.
- — (2007). La época del liberalismo (in Spanish). Volume 6 of Historia de España, edited by Josep Fontana and Ramón Villares. Barcelona-Madrid: Editorial Crítica. ISBN 978-84-8432-876-6.
- Fuentes, Juan Francisco (2007). El fin del Antiguo Régimen (1808-1868). Política y sociedad (in Spanish). Madrid: Síntesis. ISBN 978-84-975651-5-8.
- La Parra López, Emilio (2018). Fernando VII. Un rey deseado y detestado (in Spanish). XXX Comillas Prize for History, Biography and Memoirs. Barcelona: Tusquets. ISBN 978-84-9066-512-1.
- Posada Moreiras, Javier (2020) [2020]. "La Guerra de los Malcontents: ¿una guerra de guerrillas?". Revista Universitaria de Historia Militar (in Spanish). 9 (19): 165–185.
- Torras Elias, Jaume (1967). La guerra de los Agraviados (in Spanish). Foreword by Carlos Seco Serrano. Barcelona: Universidad de Barcelona.
- — (1970) [1970]. "Societat rural i moviments absolutistes. Nota sobre la guerra dels malcontents (1827)". Recerques: Història, economia i cultura (in Catalan) (1): 123–130.
