= Federalism in Spain =

Political ideology

States that would make up the Spanish nation according to the draft Federal Constitution of 1873. Neither Cuba nor Puerto Rico appear in the image, then two Spanish "provinces".

Federalism in Spain began in the 1830s, although it has its roots in the 1790s. The first and only attempt to establish a federal state in Spain occurred during the First Spanish Republic (1873-1874). After this failure, federalism was a minority political current. In the Second Spanish Republic and in the Transition, an intermediate model was chosen between federalism and centralism — the integral state, in the first case; and the regional state in the second.

== History ==
=== 19th century: the failure of the Federal Republic of 1873-1874 ===
Starting in the 1830s, the most radical factions of the democratic-republicans defended federalism as a form of political organization of the Spanish nation, sometimes even leading to Iberism — the formula of a federal republic that encompassed Portugal and Spain. There are, however, antecedents dating back to the end of the eighteenth century and the first third of the nineteenth century by the work of exiled liberals ― which Juan Francisco Fuentes has called "proto-federalism of exile" and of which he recognized that it was a very minority position. This is the case of José Marchena who already in 1792 proposed a republic made up of Spain and Portugal, or that of Juan de Olabarría, who was probably the one who drew up in 1819 a draft Constitution in which it was said that "the provinces are naturally federated" and that "the interests common to a province are within the province's competence", in addition to José Canga Argüelles who in 1826 published anonymously in London the "Letters of an American on the advantages of the federative republican governments" or of Ramón Xaudaró who in Limoges published in 1832 "Bases of a political constitution or fundamental principles of a republican system".

In the republican newspaper El Huracán published between 1840 and 1841, it held the United States as a model of "pure democracy" and included the following federal and Iberian verses:

First of all, dethrone the unfaithful race of Bourbon,
federate ourselves in droves,
with the worthy Lusitanian
and be a sovereign people
without Cristina nor Isabel.

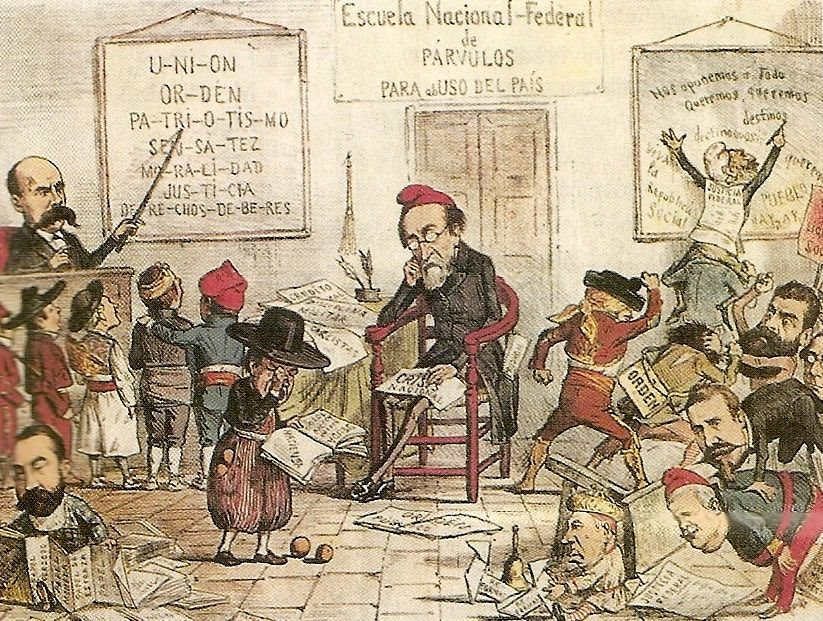
Cartoon from the magazine La Flaca (1873) in which Francisco Pi y Margall appears in the center overwhelmed by child figures dressed in different regional costumes, and to the left Emilio Castelar tried to put order. The failure of the Federal Republic of 1873-1874 blocked the process of broadening the social base of the Spanish nation and weakening the sub-state loyalties.

Federalism started from the medieval "old kingdoms" to define the states that would form the Spanish federal Republic. Its great theorist was the Catalan republican politician Francesc Pi i Margall author of "Las Nacionalidades" published in 1877 shortly after the failure of the federal experience of the First Spanish Republic. As Juan Francisco Fuentes has pointed out, the federalists reasoned in reverse that the Frenchified and the Moderates who "made the State the cornerstone of their modernizing project, to the detriment of the sovereign nation", because they considered "the nation would only reach the fullness of its existence if the unitary and centralist State - taxes, fifths, forces of order, covachuelas, monarchy - was conveniently scrapped", thus proposing a "kind of nation without a state."

The federalists' conception of Spain has been defined as a "multi-state nation that would make citizens and territories alike free", a "strange hybrid", according to Juan Francisco Fuentes, "between federalism and Jacobinism". This mixture can be seen in a document from the junta insurrecta of Barcelona in 1842 in which after reaffirming "the union and pure Spanishism of all Free Catalans" and denouncing "the tyranny and perfidy of power that has led the Nation to the most deplorable state," declared the "independence of Catalonia, with respect to the Court, until a just government is reestablished." It appears again in the "Bases for the Federal Constitution of the Spanish Nation and for the State of Catalonia" by Valentí Almirall and, finally, in the draft Federal Constitution of 1873, whose 1st article read: "The States that make up the Spanish Nation are Upper Andalusia, Lower Andalusia, Aragon, Asturias, Balearic Islands, Canary Islands, New Castile, Old Castile, Catalonia, Cuba, Extremadura, Galicia, Murcia, Navarre, Puerto Rico, Valencia, Basque Country".

According to José Luis de la Granja, Justo Beramendi and Pere Anguera, the failure of the federal proposal of the First Spanish Republic blocked the process of broadening the social base of the Spanish nation and the weakening of the sub-state loyalties, which "contributed to creating the conditions so that, when other factors acted, [the] Spanish national unity would end up being broken" than in 1875, despite everything, no one questioned.

=== Second Spanish Republic ===
In the Spanish Constitution of 1931, which governed the Second Spanish Republic, a territorial model was established halfway between federalism ―which was no longer defended by the republican parties due, among other reasons, to the influence of regenerationism and the failure of the federal experience of 1873-1874 ― and centralism ― for example, Republican Union conceived the State as "an interaction of municipal and regional autonomies within the indestructible unity of Spain". This new formula was called the "Integral State, compatible with the autonomy of the Municipalities and Regions." But it was not agreed that the autonomy regime would be for everyone by demanding a very broad support from the population ―two thirds of the electoral census― in the “regions” that demanded access to it ―in fact only Catalonia, the Basque Country and Galicia undertook the process.

=== Transition and democratic consolidation ===
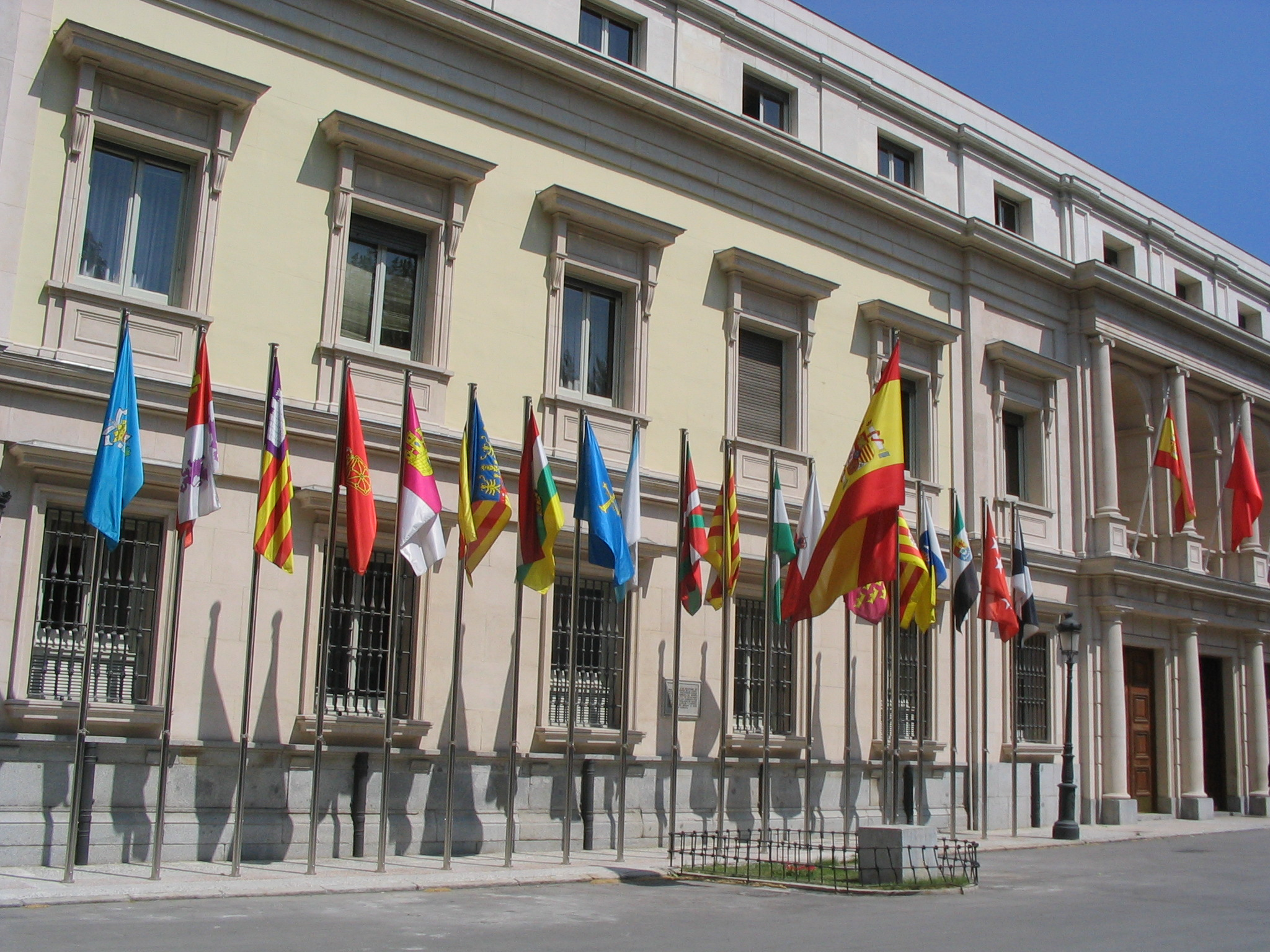
Flag of Spain and flags of the 17 autonomous communities and the two autonomous cities on the facade of the Senate building in Madrid.

In the Transition the hybrid territorial model ―neither centralist nor federalist― of the Integral State of the Second Spanish Republic was adopted with some variations. This was embodied in the Constitution of 1978. In article 2 it was said that the Constitution "recognizes and guarantees the right to autonomy of nationalities and regions", where "nationality" was a term that had never been used in the history of Spanish constitutionalism and whose concrete meaning was not specified in any of the following articles. As recognized by the socialist Gregorio Peces-Barba years after the Constitution was approved, the distinction between "nationalities" and "regions" was inspired by the exiled socialist Anselmo Carretero's idea of Spain as a "nation of nations".

The "State of the autonomies" that ended up being constituted by progressively equalizing the competencies and institutional architecture of the Autonomous Communities of the "slow track" of Article 143 of the Constitution and of the "fast track" of 151 (Catalonia, the Basque Country, Galicia and Andalusia), it did not achieve its main objective: that the various nationalisms existing in Spain agree on the type of State acceptable to all. The sub-state nationalisms were not satisfied with the autonomic solution, nor with the "coffee for all" ―the generalization of autonomies― which was finally adopted and they continued to demand a confederal model and even independence. However, the so-called "coffee for all" model has been compared to a symmetrical federalism.

In the first decade of the 21st century, the Catalan socialist Pasqual Maragall, who advocated the concept of "differential federalism"—the center of his political thought—proposed through the Statute of Autonomy of Catalonia of 2006 the fit of Catalonia in Spain within a federal model inspired in a certain way by the traditionally supported "asymmetric federalism" for the peripheral nationalisms.

== See also ==
- Anarchism in Spain
- Autonomous communities of Spain
- Cantonalism
- Federalisation of the European Union
- Federal republicanism
- Glorious Revolution

== Bibliography ==
- De la Granja, José Luis; Beramendi, Justo; Anguera, Pere (2001). La España de los nacionalismos y las autonomías (in Spanish). Madrid: Síntesis. ISBN 84-7738-918-7.
- Duarte i Montserrat, Àngel (2011). "Pasqual Maragall, de la familia como patria". In Xosé M. Núñez Seixas; Fernando Molina (eds.). Los heterodoxos de la patria: biografías de nacionalistas atípicos en la España del siglo XX (in Spanish). Granada: Comares. pp. 309–329. ISBN 978-84-9836-833-8.
- Fuentes, Juan Francisco (2013). "Conceptos previos: Patria y nación en los orígenes de la España contemporánea". In Antonio Morales Moya; Juan Pablo Fusi; Andrés de Blas Guerrero (eds.). Historia de la nación y del nacionalismo español (in Spanish). Barcelona: Galaxia Gutenberg. ISBN 978-84-8109-997-3.
- Juliá, Santos (2013). "Nación, nacionalidades y regiones en la transición". In Antonio Morales Moya; Juan Pablo Fusi; Andrés de Blas Guerrero (eds.). Historia de la nación y del nacionalismo español (in Spanish). Barcelona: Galaxia Gutenberg. ISBN 978-84-8109-997-3.
- Núñez Seixas, Xosé M. (2018). Suspiros de España. El nacionalismo español, 1808-2018 (in Spanish). Barcelona: Crítica. ISBN 978-84-9199-027-7.
