= Rafael Núñez Florencio =

Spanish historian (born 1956)

- Born: 1956 (age 69–70); Camas, Seville, Spain

Rafael Núñez Florencio (born 1956) is a Spanish historian, philosopher, and critic.

== Works ==
- El terrorismo anarquista 1888–1909 (1983)
- Utopistas y autoritarios en 1900 (1994)
- El ejército español en el desastre de 1898 (1997)
- Tal como éramos: España hace un siglo (1998)
- Sol y sangre. La Imagen de España en el mundo (2001)
- Con la salsa de su hambre. Los extranjeros ante la mesa hispana (2004)
- Hollada piel de toro: del sentimiento de la naturaleza a la construcción nacional del paisaje (2004)
- Tierra y Libertad. Cien años de anarquismo en España, edited by Julián Casanova Ruiz (2010, contributor)
- El peso del pesimismo. Del 98 al desencanto (2011)

== Bibliography ==
- Astorga, Antonio (1998-03-05). "Juan Pablo Fusi presenta "Tal como éramos", retrato de la España de hace un siglo, de Núñez Florencio". ABC. Madrid: 54.
- Ávila Álvarez, Antonio María; Díaz-Mier, Miguel Ángel (April–May 2002). "Sol y sangre. La imagen de España en el mundo" (PDF). Información Comercial Española, ICE (799). Ministry of Economy (Spain): 241–242. ISSN 0019-977X.
- Bastenier, Miguel Ángel (2011-02-26). "El peso del pesimismo. Del 98 al desencanto. Rafael Núñez Florencio". El País.
- Brey, Gérard (2012). "Tierra y Libertad. Cien años de anarquismo en España". Cahiers de civilisation espagnole contemporaine (número especial, L’anarchisme espagnol). doi:10.4000/ccec.4126. ISSN 1957-7761.
- Bueno, Pilar (July–August 2004). "Los curiosos impertinentes y la Fonda Hispana". Revista de Libros (91/92). Fundación Caja Madrid: 36–38. ISSN 1698-532X. JSTOR 30230354.
- Sarabia, Bernabé (2004-04-08). "Historia de la comida. Felipe Fernández-Armesto. Traducción de Victoria Ordóñez. Tusquets. Barcelona, 2004. 372 páginas, 20 euros. Rafael Núñez Florencio: Con la salsa de su hambre. Alianza. Madrid, 2004. 310 páginas, 15'38 euros". El Cultural.
- Fuente, Manuel de la (2011-01-25). "El historiador Núñez Florencio reflexiona sobre el pesimismo español". ABC. Madrid: 61.
- Gómez Mendoza, Josefina (December 2007). "Construcción y deconstrucción del paisaje español". Revista de Libros (132). Archived from the original on 2015-02-22.
- Payne, Stanley G. (2011-05-01). "El peso del pesimismo en España". Revista de Libros. Translated by Gago, Luis.
- Ruiz Manjón, Octavio (2011-01-28). "El peso del pesimismo. Del 98 al desencanto. Rafael Núñez Florencio. Marcial Pons. Madrid, 2010. 480 páginas, 23 euros". El Cultural.
- Vivas, Ángel (2011-01-11). "España, ¡qué fatalidad!". El Mundo. Madrid.
