= Jerónimo Merino =

Spanish guerrilla fighter and priest

Jerónimo Merino Cob (1769 in Villoviado, Burgos Province – 1844 in Alençon, France), alias El Cura Merino (The Priest Merino) was a Spanish guerrilla fighter and priest.

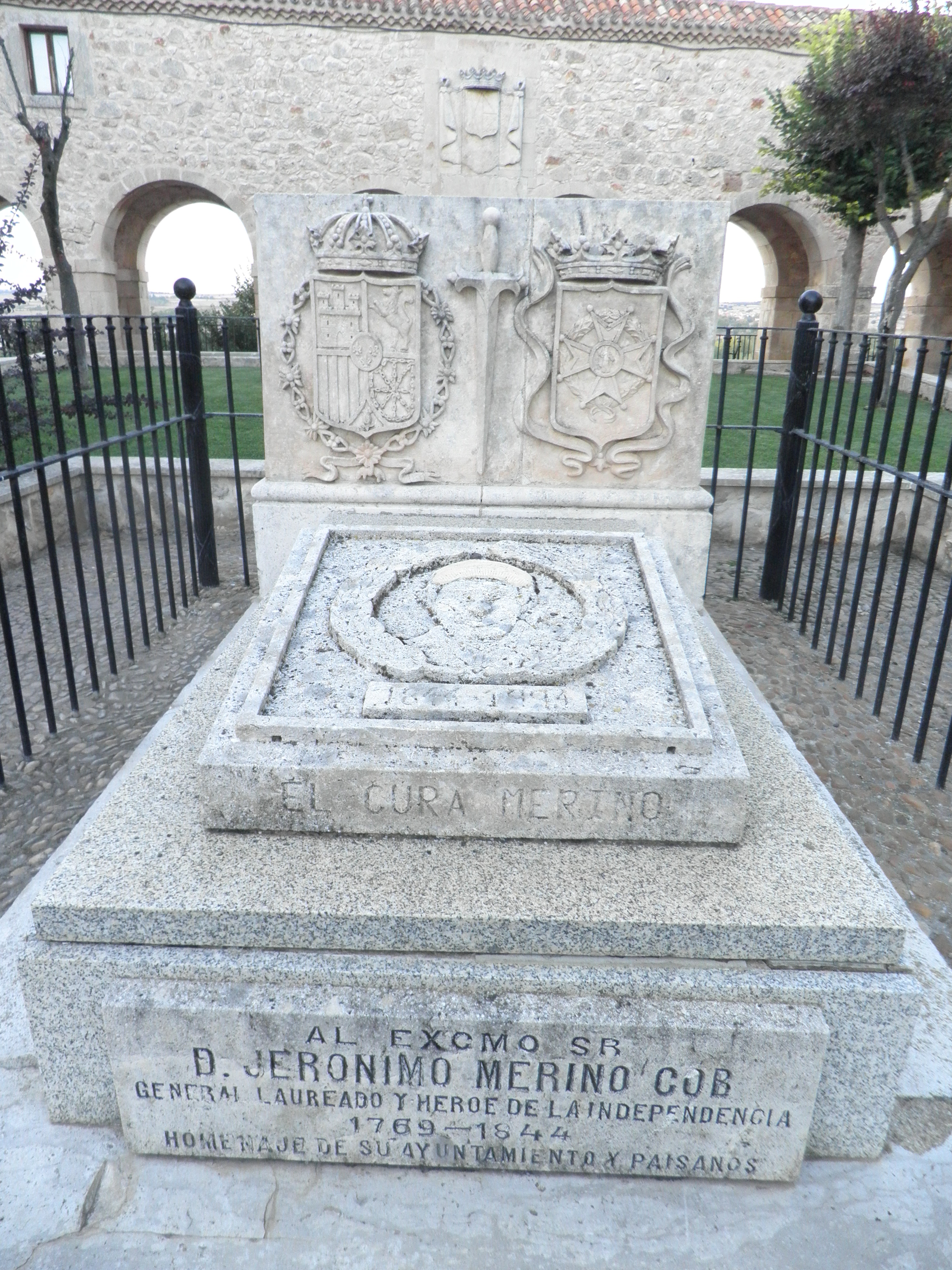
Merino's tomb in Lerma

He was the parish priest in his birthplace when the War of Spanish Independence began in 1808. After a quarrel with the French military, he fled from his village and led a guerrilla group that never suffered defeat. King Ferdinand VII rewarded him with a seat in the Valencia's cathedral chapter but, his rough lifestyle did not adapt to this kind of life (he even piped a fellow), and returned to his village. When the liberal revolution of 1820 succeeded he returned to lead a guerrilla group until the French absolutist invasion of 1823. In 1833, he joined the Carlist army and commanded fourteen Battalions in the mountains of Burgos. His troops menaced Madrid, operated in la Rioja and the province of Soria and tried to seize the city of Burgos. He participated also in the siege of Bilbao. He was appointed Carlist commander-in-chief of Old Castile. After the Vergara agreement of 1839 (which he rejected) he was exiled to France, where he died. He is buried in Lerma, Burgos Province.
