= Revista de Libros =

- Editor: Javier Moscoso Sarabia
- Frequency: Bi-monthly
- First issue: 1 December 1996; 29 years ago
- Country: Spain
- Based in: Madrid
- Language: Spanish
- Website: revistadelibros.com
- ISSN: 1137-2249

Revista de Libros (Review of Books) is a Spanish-language bi-monthly literary review magazine. The magazine was a print publication from 1996 to 2011. It was restarted as an online-only magazine in 2013. In 2016 the print edition was also started.

== History and profile ==
Revista de Libros was established in 1996. It was edited by Álvaro Delgado-Gal. The magazine was funded by the Fundación Caja Madrid until 2011.

It provided its readers with the intellectual reviews both in print, electronic and electronic facsimile edition. In 2011 Fundación Caja Madrid stopped financing the magazine due to economic problems. Then, Revista de Libros ceased publication. In 2013 the magazine was started as an online-only monthly publication and Álvaro Delgado-Gal continues to edit the magazine. In 2016 the magazine launched its print edition, which was made possible through the financial assistance of Colegio Libre de Eméritos. The print edition appears bi-monthly.

== Awards ==
- 1997: National Prize for the Promotion of Reading, from the Spanish Ministerio de Educación y Cultura
- 2001: Bartolomé March Critical Prize (Premio Bartolomé March a la Crítica)
- 2004: News Magazines Association Price (Asociación de Revistas de Información
- 2005: Álvaro Delgado-Gal was awarded the Premio a la Bibliodiversidad, from the Asociación de Editores de Madrid, for his magazine.

== See also ==
- List of magazines in Spain
