= Ominous Decade =

1823–1833 absolutist rule of Ferdinand VII of Spain

Kingdom of Spain and the Indies Reino de España e Indias
- 1823–1833
- Flag Coat of Arms
- Motto: Plus ultra (Latin) (English: "Further Beyond")
- Anthem: Marcha Real
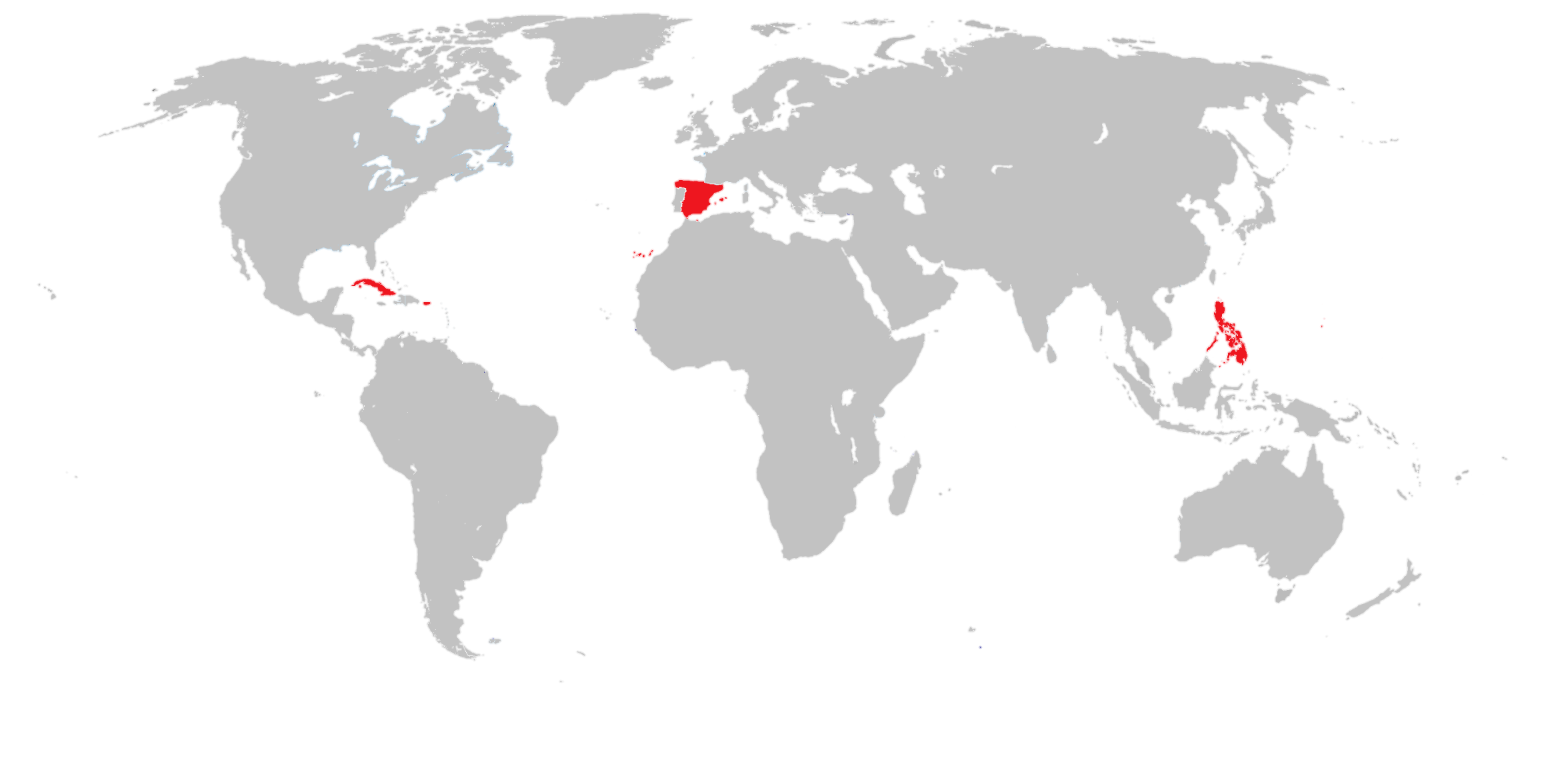
- Capital: Madrid
- Common languages: Spanish
- Religion: Roman Catholic Church (official)
- Demonym: Spanish
- Government: Unitary absolute monarchy
- King
  - 1823–1833: Ferdinand VII
- Legislature: Cortes Generales
- History
  - Hundred Thousand Sons of Saint Louis: 1823
  - Death of Ferdinand VII: 1833
- Currency: Escudo, Real
Preceded by	Succeeded by
Trienio Liberal	Reign of Isabella II of Spain

The Ominous Decade (Note: Spanish: Década Ominosa) was the period of the history of Spain encompassing the last ten years of Ferdinand VII's reign, dating from the abolition of the Spanish Constitution of 1812 on 1 October 1823 to his death on 29 September 1833. The decade began with the restoration of Ferdinand to the throne with the assistance of the French and saw the suppression of numerous revolts around Spain coming from both the Liberal and ultra-Reactionary sides.

== Background ==
Ferdinand VII had become king after winning the Peninsular War, where Spain and allies such as the United Kingdom, defeated Napoleonic France. He returned to Spain on 24 March 1814 and his first act was the abolition of the 1812 liberal constitution; this was followed by the dissolution of the two chambers of the Spanish Parliament on 10 May.

These were the first moves towards a severe anti-liberal reaction, which caused a series of military riots, started in January 1820 by General Rafael del Riego. Ferdinand was forced to reintroduce the Spanish Constitution of 1812, with a solemn oath during a ceremony in Madrid on 10 March 1820. This began the so-called Trienio Liberal ("Liberal Triennium", or Constitutional Triennium), during which Ferdinand had to witness the fall of the main absolutist institutions and privileges, and the increasing shift towards radicalism of the Parliament's majority.

Ferdinand, however, had not abandoned his reactionary goals, and appealed to the Holy Alliance established at the Congress of Vienna in 1814, by which the main absolutist monarchies of Europe had agreed to help each other in case one of them had to suffer a democratic revolution. On 7 April 1823, France launched an expedition, by which a military corps, known as the Hundred Thousand Sons of St. Louis (Los Cien Mil Hijos de San Luis) and led by Louis Antoine, Duke of Angoulême, invaded the Spanish territory. Louis was welcomed on 24 May in Madrid, after the liberals had abandoned the city and taken refuge in the commercial city of Cádiz, where Ferdinand was kept as prisoner.

Here the democratic Cortes met to declare the king's deposition. The French troops besieged the city, until 31 August, when the Battle of Trocadero marked the liberals' defeat and the capitulation of the city.

== History ==
=== Reactionary restoration ===
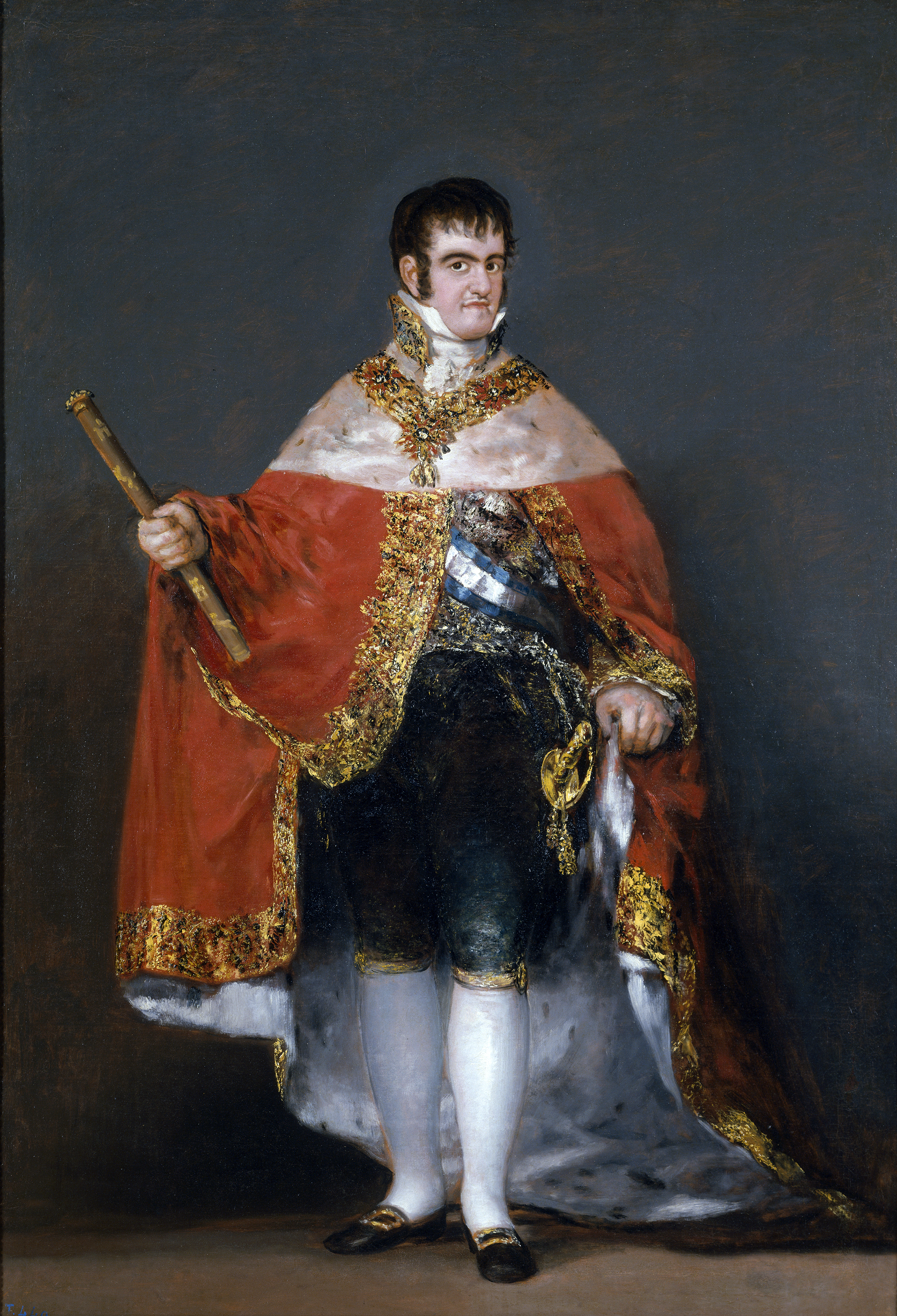
Portrait of Ferdinand VII by Francisco Goya.

After his restoration, Ferdinand VII started a period of his reign known as "Ominous Decade", due to its marked stress on the suppression of his enemies. Most of the members of the Liberal Party fled abroad, to London (where some received monetary help by the British government for their role in the wars against Napoleon), Paris, Malta, the United States, or to newly proclaimed independent republics of South America, towards which the Spanish liberal government had held a far less hostile stance than Ferdinand VII. Others were eliminated, such as Del Riego, the main symbol of the revolution, who was hanged on 7 November 1823 in La Cebada Square of Madrid.

Harsh censorship was re-established, while an archaic organization of universities was introduced under the strict control of the Minister of Justice, Francisco Tadeo Calomarde, who was the mastermind of the suppression of opposition and of the restoration of former institutions, such as the Jesuits (outlawed by the Bourbons in the late 18th century), monasteries and others. The French corps remained in Spain, with the de facto role of an occupation force: however, its heavy cost of supply caused further damage to the Spanish treasury, which had been depleted under the liberal government, also due to the South American revolutions.

The discontent of the Spanish military was further spurred by the formation of the Royalist Volunteers, a militia created by Ferdinand VII in 1823, a short time after the collapse of the constitutional cabinet, to provide the king a direct means of suppression against the liberal opposition. In 1826 the militia amounted to some 200,000 volunteers, half of which included in 486 infantry battalions, 20 artillery companies, 52 cavalry squadrons and some sapper companies.

=== Fall of the last bastions in the Americas ===
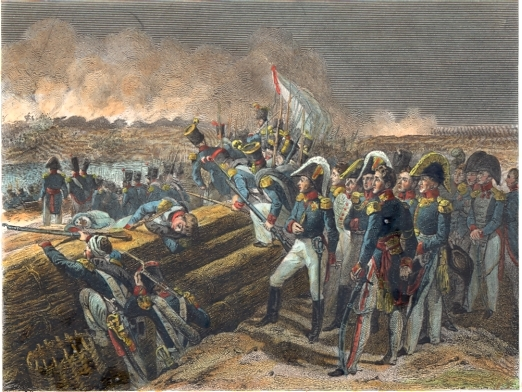
The French restoration army ends the Spanish Liberal Triennium at the Battle of Trocadero (Cádiz), 31 August 1823.

Spain's situation changed again in 1823, when Spanish supporters of absolutism turned to the European powers that had defeated Napoleon, the so-called Holy Alliance, and obtained an army of 132,000 French troops to invade Spain, suppress the Liberal Triennium and the Constitution, and restore Ferdinand VII to absolute rule. Rafael del Riego, leader of the Cádiz uprising, was hanged on 7 November 1823, and the promoters of the liberal movement were executed, marginalized or exiled. The Holy Alliance army remained in Spain until 1827, during the Ominous Decade, to sustain Ferdinand VII's absolute monarchy. On 1 October 1823, Ferdinand VII decreed the abolition of everything approved during the Triennium, including the appointments of military commanders in America. This provoked a wave of insubordination and new insurrections, such as Pedro Antonio de Olañeta's rebellion, which hindered and divided the last defenders of the Spanish monarchy.

No further expedition was ever formed in Spain, and the collapse in America was irreversible. The surviving royalist commanders and their armies, neglected by the government in Spain and divided by liberal–absolutist discord, made their last stand at the Battle of Ayacucho. Some held out even longer, San Juan de Ulúa in Veracruz, Mexico, resisted until 1825, in the Chiloé Archipelago and the Real Felipe Fortress at Callao until January 1826. In the following decade, royalist guerrillas continued to operate in several countries and Spain launched a few attempts to retake parts of the Spanish American mainland. In 1827 Colonel José Arizabalo started an irregular war with Venezuelan guerrillas, and Brigadier Isidro Barradas led the last attempt with regular troops to reconquer Mexico in 1829. The Pincheira brothers moved to Patagonia and remained there as a multiethnic royalist outlaws gang until defeated in 1832. But efforts like these did not reverse the new political situation.

=== Political instability ===
The decade saw an endless series of riots and attempts of revolutions, such as that of Torrijos, funded by English liberals, on 11 December 1831. Aside from the liberal side, Ferdinand's policies caused discontent also in the conservative party: in 1827 a revolt broke out in Catalonia, and later extended to Valencia, Aragon, the Basque Country and Andalusia, spurred by ultra-reactionaries according to whom Ferdinand's restoration had been too timid, failing in particular to reinstate the Inquisition. In what was called the War of the Agraviados, some 30,000 men controlled most of Catalonia and some of the northern regions, and even established an autonomous government. Ferdinand intervened personally, moving to Tarragona to quench the revolt: he promised an amnesty, but once the rioters had surrendered, he had their leaders executed and others exiled to France.

Further instability came when, on 31 March 1830, Ferdinand issued the Pragmatic Sanction, which had been approved by his father Charles IV as early as 1789, but not published till then. The decree allowed the succession to the Spanish throne also to female heirs, in case a male one was not available. Ferdinand would have only two children, both daughters, the eldest being the future queen Isabella II, who was born in October 1830. The Sanction excluded from the succession Ferdinand's brother, Infante Carlos María Isidro of Spain.

=== Illness and death of Ferdinand ===
In his later years, Ferdinand fell severely ill, and he lost the ability to direct his own affairs. His young wife, Maria Christina of the Two Sicilies, took the regency. Since the other pretender, Don Carlos, was considered a champion of absolutism, Maria Christina decided to seek support from the liberal opposition.

Her policy worsened the acrimony among Carlos's supporters. At Ferdinand's death, in 1833, his daughter Isabella II was declared Queen; Carlos opposed this and declared himself the legitimate heir to the throne with the name of Charles V. This was the beginning of the First Carlist War.

== Sources ==
- Luis, Jean-Philippe. "La década ominosa (1823–1833), una etapa desconocida en la construcción de la España contemporánea". Ayer: 85–118. ISSN 1134-2277.
