= Juan Francisco Fuentes =

Spanish historian (born 1955)

Juan Francisco Fuentes Aragonés (born 1955 in Barcelona, Spain) is a Spanish historian specialized in contemporary history.

Born in 1955 in Barcelona, he is professor at the Complutense University of Madrid. His works cover contemporary history and socialism in Spain, including biographies of José Marchena, Francisco Largo Caballero, Luis Araquistáin, and Adolfo Suárez. He collaborated with Javier Fernández Sebastián, with whom he wrote Historia del periodismo español and Diccionario político y social del siglo XX español.

== Works ==
- José Marchena: biografía política e intelectual (Crítica, 1989)
- (Coauthor: Javier Fernández Sebastián) Historia del periodismo español. Prensa, política y opinión pública en la España contemporánea (Editorial Síntesis, 1997)
- Luis Araquistáin y el socialismo español en el exilio (1939-1959) (Biblioteca Nueva, 2002).
- Largo Caballero: el Lenin español (Síntesis, 2005)
- El fin del Antiguo Régimen (1808-1868). Política y sociedad (Síntesis, 2007)
- Adolfo Suárez: biografía política (Editorial Planeta, 2011)
- Con el rey y contra el rey. Los socialistas y la Monarquía (La Esfera, 2016)

== Sources ==
Bibliography

- Álvarez Tardío, Manuel (2012). "Juan Francisco Fuentes: Adolfo Suárez. Biografía política". Revista de Estudios Políticos (158). CEPC: 209–214. ISSN 0048-7694.
- Blas Guerrero, Andrés de (16 July 2011). "Adolfo Suárez La historia que no se contó". El País.
- Canal, Jordi (2010). "Javier Fernández Sebastián y Juan Francisco Fuentes (dirs.), Diccionario político y social del siglo XX español". Mélanges de la Casa de Velázquez. 40 (2). Casa de Velázquez: 225–228. doi:10.4000/mcv.3524. ISSN 2173-1306.
- Fernández Sirvent, Rafael (2008). "Del ¡Viva Fernando VII! al ¡Abajo los Borbones!". Historia Constitucional: Revista Electrónica de Historia Constitucional (9): 401–406. ISSN 1576-4729.
- Jackson, Gabriel (2006). "El mito, explicado". Revista de Libros (115–116). Fundación Caja Madrid: 20–21. ISSN 1137-2249. Archived from the original on 11 January 2017.
- La Parra López, Emilio (May 2003). "El giro político de Luis Araquistáin". Revista de Libros (77). Fundación Caja Madrid. ISSN 1137-2249. Archived from the original on 12 January 2017.
- Ledesma Vera, José Luis (2007). "Juan Francisco Fuentes, Largo Caballero. El Lenin español". Mélanges de la Casa de Velázquez. 37 (2). Casa de Velázquez: 260–262. doi:10.4000/mcv.1934. ISSN 2173-1306.
- López, François (2010). "José Marchena y su historia literaria de España". In Armando Alberola Romá; Elisabel Larriba (eds.). Las élites y la "Revolución de España" (1808-1814): estudios en homenaje al profesor Gérard Dufour. Alicante: Universidad de Alicante. pp. 293–308. ISBN 978-84-9717-086-4.
- Núñez Florencio, Rafael (10 June 2016). "Con el rey y contra el rey. Los socialistas y la Monarquía. Juan Francisco Fuentes. La Esfera. Madrid, 2016. 280 páginas". El Cultural.
- Rojas Friend, Antonio (1997). "Fuentes, Juan Francisco y Fernández Sebastián, Javier; Historia del periodismo español: prensa, política y opinión pública en la España contemporánea". Historia y Comunicación Social (2). UCM: 330–331. ISSN 1137-0734.
- Ruiz-Manjón, Octavio (21 April 2005). "Largo Caballero: el Lenin español. Juan Francisco Fuentes. Síntesis. Madrid, 2005. 432 páginas, 23'50 euros". El Cultural.
- Ruiz-Manjón, Octavio (25 February 2011). "Adolfo Suárez. La historia que no se contó. Juan Francisco Fuentes Aragonés. Planeta. Barcelona 2011. 496 páginas, 24'90 euros". El Cultural.
