= Josep Fontana =

Spanish historian (1931–2018)

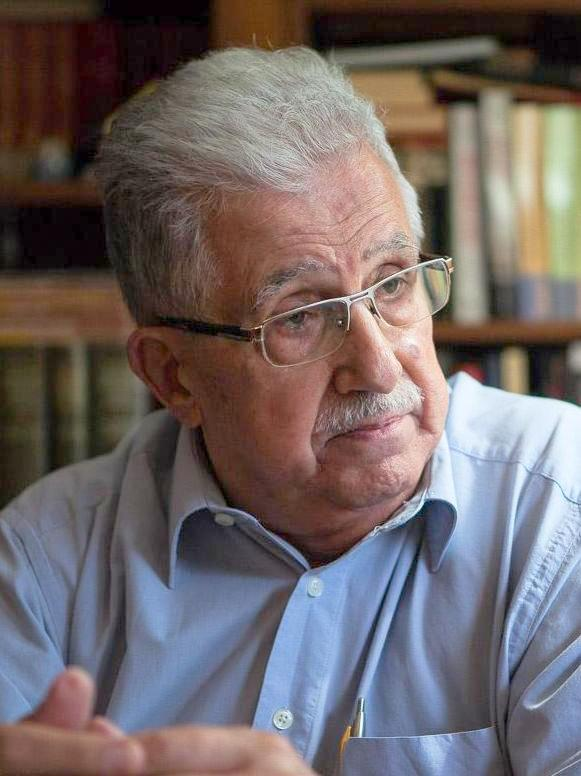
- Josep Fontana in 2017
- Born: Josep Fontana i Lázaro; 20 November 1931; Barcelona, Catalonia
- Died: 28 August 2018 (aged 86); Barcelona, Catalonia
- Education: Universidat de Barcelona
- Awards: Creu de Sant Jordi
- Scientific career
- Fields: History

Josep Fontana i Lázaro (20 November 1931 – 28 August 2018) was a historian from Catalonia.

== Education ==
Born in Barcelona, he received his master's degree in philosophy and letters (section history) at the University of Barcelona in 1956 and his doctorate in history by the same university in 1970. He was a student of Jaume Vicens i Vives and Ferran Soldevila. Their main currents of investigation are economic history, 19th century Spanish history and the history of property. He was influenced in his thought by E.P. Thompson, Pierre Vilar, Gramsci and Walter Benjamin.

== Career ==
The Jaume Vicens i Vives University Institute of History, the interdisciplinary Ph.D. history institute in the Pompeu Fabra University in Barcelona was originally directed and founded by Dr. Fontana, in which he continued to teach classes of Introduction to History and 20th-century Spanish history until his death. He taught economic, the interplay between history, law and economics and contemporary history at the University of Barcelona, the University of Valencia and at the Autonomous University of Barcelona.

Dr. Fontana was an active contributor to scholarly history publications after 1970, among them, l'Avenç (1976). The Introduction to History course taught during the first cycle of the humanities track of the Universitat Pompeu Fabra is based on Fontana's book Introduction to the Study of History.

== Publications ==
- 1971: La quiebra de la monarquía absoluta (1814-1820) (Crítica)
- 1979: La crisis del Antiguo Régimen (Crítica)
- 1982: Historia: análisis del pasado y proyecto social (Crítica)
- 1992: La història després de la fi de la història (Eumo)
- 1994: Europa ante el espejo (Crítica)
- 1999: Enseñar historia con una guerra civil de por medio (Crítica)
- 1999: Introducció a l'estudi de la història (Crítica)
- 2000: La història dels homes (Crítica)
- 2005: Aturar el temps (Crítica)
- 2006: De en medio del tiempo (Crítica)
- 2006: La construcció de la identitat (Base)
- 2007: Historia de España, vol. 6: La época del liberalismo (Crítica-Marcial Pons)
- 2010: L'ofici d'historiador (Documenta Universitària)
- 2011: Por el bien del imperio. Una historia del mundo desde 1945 (Pasado & Presente)
- 2013: El futuro es un país extraño. Una reflexión sobre la crisis social de comienzos de siglo (Pasado & Presente)
- 2014: La formació d'una identitat. Una història de Catalunya (Eumo)
- 2017: El siglo de la revolución (Crítica)
- 2018: L'ofici d'historiador (new augmented edition, Arcàdia)
- 2018: Sobre la història i els seus usos públics (Publicacions de la Universitat de València)
- 2018: La crisi com a triomf del capitalisme. Anàlisi del passat i perspectives marxistes (posthumous publication, Tres i Quatre)
- 2019: Capitalisme i democràcia 1756-1848 Com va començar aquest engany (posthumous publication, Edicions 62)
