= Battle of Miajadas =

1809 battle during the Peninsular War

- Part of Peninsular War
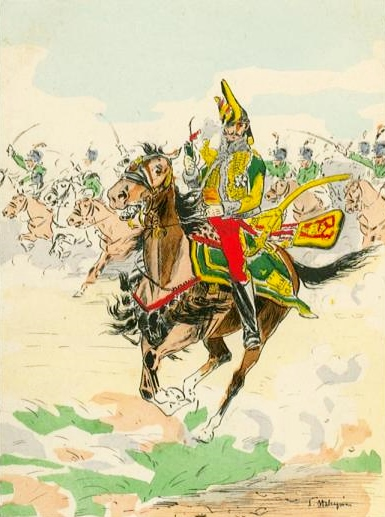
- General Count de Lasalle, one of the most talented French cavalry commanders, led the pursuit of the Spanish army ahead of his cavalry division.
Date	21 March 1809
Location	Miajadas, Extremadura, Spain 39°9′4.57″N 5°54′30.28″W
Result	Spanish victory

Belligerents
(France) French Empire	Kingdom of Spain

Commanders and leaders
Jacques Gervais Subervie	Juan Henestrosa

Strength
1 regiment	2 regiments

Casualties and losses
132–150	Low

Peninsular War: Castile & Andalusia
current battle

The battle of Miajadas took place on 21 March 1809 in Miajadas, Spain, and saw the Spanish cavalry led by General Henestrosa ambush the 10th French Horse Chasseurs Regiment commanded by Colonel Subervie. The French troopers suffered heavy losses when the two Spanish cavalry regiments charged them by the flank.

== Background ==
After defeating the Anglo-Spanish armies, Napoleon went back to France in January 1809 to face Austria. Before he left, he asked his brother Joseph Bonaparte, King of Spain, to take control of Andalusia. The I Corps of Marshal Claude-Victor Perrin was in charge of this operation. It comprised three infantry divisions under Generals of Division François Amable Ruffin, Eugène-Casimir Villatte and Jean François Leval, two cavalry divisions commanded by Antoine Charles Louis de Lasalle and Victor de Fay de La Tour-Maubourg as well as the artillery under General of Division Alexandre-Antoine Hureau de Sénarmont. In all, there were 20,000 men and 50 guns.

The campaign started on 15 March 1809. The French army crossed the Tagus River on several points and converged on Almaraz, defended by the Spanish Army of Extremadura led by Captain-General Gregorio García de la Cuesta. Duke del Parque's forces were drubbed at Mesas de Ibor by Leval's German division. These defeat forced La Cuesta to withdraw on the line of the Guadiana. During the retreat, the Spanish cavalry under General Henestrosa was assigned to the rearguard. On the other side, General Lasalle led the French pursuit ahead of his cavalry division, which was made up of the 5th and 10th Horse Chasseurs Regiments, the 2nd Hussars Regiment and the 9th Dragoons Regiment.

On 20 March, a first clash occurred at Berrocal between the 5th Chasseurs and the Spanish Carabiniers. The carabiniers were repelled with heavy losses by the French cavalrymen which lost 10 killed and 15 wounded. However, Rickard called the action a Spanish victory. The next day, while La Cuesta's withdrawing continued, Henestrosa decided to ambush his French pursuers.

== Action ==
On that day, preceding the rest of Lasalle's division, the 10th French Horse Chasseurs Regiment under the command of Colonel Subervie arrived near the village of Miajadas, without suspecting the presence of the Spanish rearguard. Seeing this isolated regiment, Henestrosa put a small detachment of cavalry in front of Miajadas to lure his opponents and hid his own units, the Almanza and Infante Cavalry Regiments, on each side of the road. Subervie commit himself into the trap and charged the few Spanish cavalrymen positioned outside the village. The Spanish cavalry in ambush charged immediately and quickly got the better of the 10th Chasseurs which suffered significant losses during the unequal fight. Then, Henestrosa was able to withdraw without being engaged by Lasalle who had just arrived on the battlefield with the rest of his division.

== Result ==
At the end of the action, the 10th Chasseurs had 63 killed and 70 wounded according to Anglo-Spanish sources · while the French authors gave 62 killed including one officer. A third source reported 150 French casualties and noticed that Spanish losses were "very low". Hourtoulle said that French dead bodies were "horribly mutilated" and added that "a serious bloody check had been contracted by Lasalle's division; this debt, the enemies are going to paid it soon".

The setback of Miajadas forced Lasalle to release the pursuit, giving time to la Cuesta to receive reinforcements. Made confident by the success of his rearguard, the Spanish general positioned his army on the heights of Medellín where the French arrived on 23 March at the morning. The ensuing battle was at first favourable to the Spanish but soon turned into disaster. On the left, Lasalle's cavalry butchered his Spanish counterpart and cut down vigorously the fleeing defenders, avenging the chasseurs of the 10th Regiment who had died at Miajadas.

== See also ==
- Timeline of the Peninsular War

== Bibliography ==
- Hourtoulle, François-Guy; Girbal, Jack (1979). Le Général Comte Charles Lasalle, 1775-1809 : premier cavalier de l'Empire. Copernic.
- Rickard, J. (2008). "Combat of Miajadas, 21 March 1809". Archived from the original on 29 September 2020.
- Borreill, Philippe (2005). "Les batailles de la " Guerra de la Independencia " vues par les Espagnols: batailles de Valls, Medellin, 2d Oporto" (PDF). Archived from the original (PDF) on 5 January 2016.
