= Louis Victorin Cassagne =

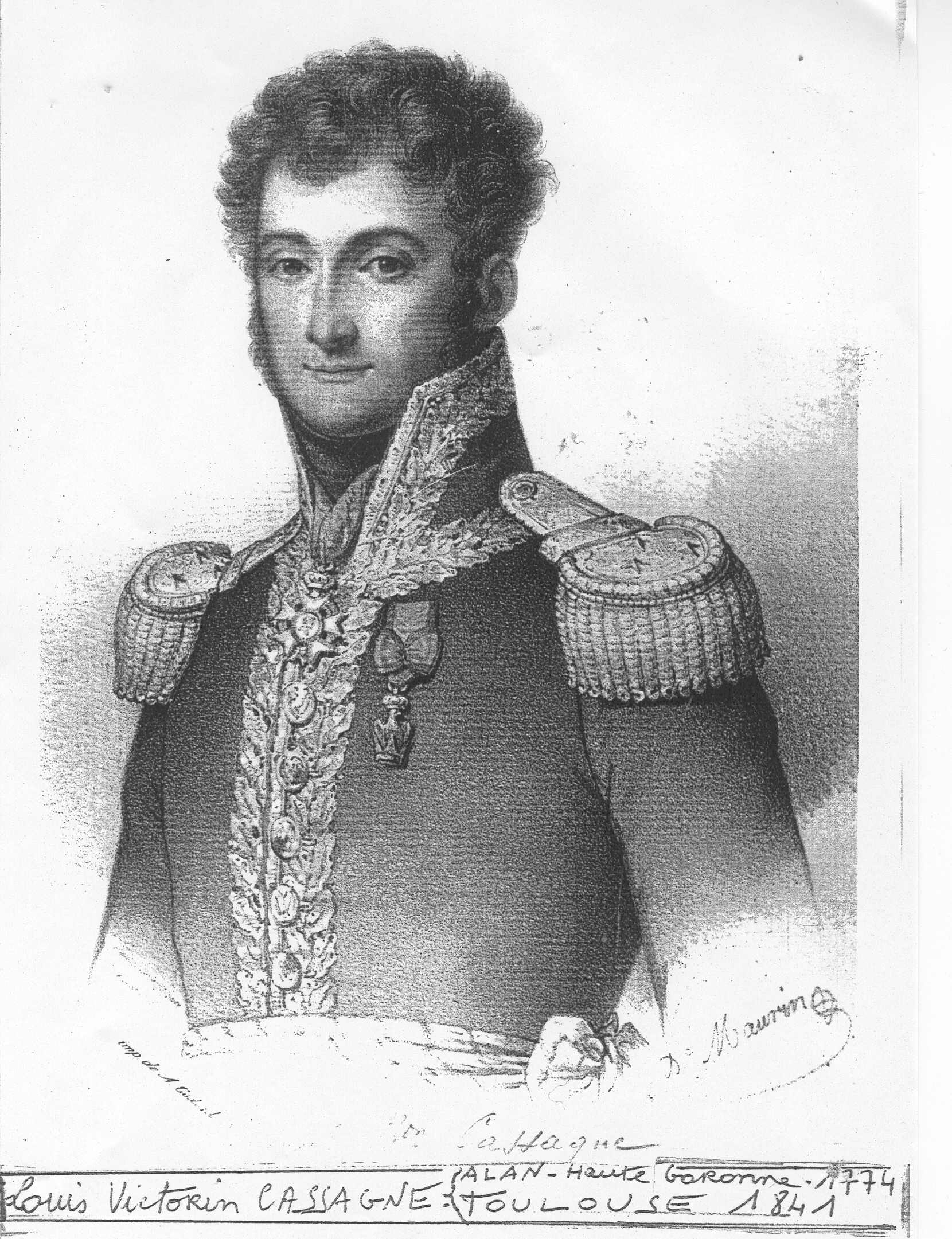
- Louis Victorin Cassagne
- Born: 5 June 1774; Alan, Haute-Garonne, France
- Died: 6 July 1841 (aged 67) Toulouse, France
- Allegiance: France
- Branch: Infantry
- Service years: (France) 1792–1839
- Rank: General of Division
- Conflicts: War of the Pyrenees; Battle of the Black Mountain; War of the First Coalition; Battle of Loano; Battle of Lonato; Battle of Tarvis; French campaign in Egypt; Battle of the Pyramids; Siege of Acre; Battle of Alexandria; War of the Third Coalition; War of the Fourth Coalition; Battle of Auerstadt; Battle of Pułtusk; Battle of Eylau; Peninsular War; Battle of Bailén; Battle of Talavera; Siege of Cádiz; Battle of Vitoria; War of the Sixth Coalition; Battle of Dresden; Hundred Days
- Awards: Légion d'Honneur, CC 1811; Order of Saint Louis, 1814
- Other work: Baron of the Empire, 1808

Louis Victorin Cassagne (French pronunciation: [lwi viktoʁɛ̃ kasaɲ]; 5 June 1774 – 6 July 1841) became a French division commander during the Napoleonic Wars. In 1793 he joined a free company which was immediately absorbed into a volunteer battalion. Until 1795 he fought in the Army of the Eastern Pyrenees as a captain. In 1795–1797 he served in the Army of Italy, fighting at Loano, Lonato and Tarvis. In 1798–1801 he participated in the French campaign in Egypt and Syria, fighting at the Pyramids, Acre and Alexandria. In 1801 he was made commander of an infantry regiment. Cassagne was wounded an extraordinary number of times, especially during his early campaigns.

Cassagne led his regiment at Auerstadt and Pułtusk in 1806 and Eylau in 1807. He was promoted general of brigade in 1807 and became Baron of the Empire in 1808. He transferred to Spain and was captured at Bailén. After exchange he served at Talavera and Cádiz. Promoted to general of division in 1813, he led a division that year at Vitoria. Transferring to Germany he led a division at Dresden and was captured when that fortress surrendered. During the Hundred Days he was employed by Napoleon on the Spanish frontier. Placed on inactive duty during the Bourbon Restoration he was recalled to active duty in 1833 and retired six years later. His surname is one of the names inscribed under the Arc de Triomphe, on Column 27.

== Early career ==
Cassagne was born on 5 June 1774 at Alan in what later became the Haute-Garonne department. On 23 March 1793 he joined a free company as a lieutenant and, the next day, saw the unit merged with the 8th Battalion of the Haute-Garonne Volunteers with Cassagne as captain. Assigned to the Army of the Eastern Pyrenees, he defended the crossing of the Têt River near Perpignan in August 1793. He served with distinction in November 1794 at the Battle of the Black Mountain and subsequent capture of Sant Ferran Castle at Figueres. After the Peace of Basel ended the war with Spain, Cassagne's unit transferred to the Army of Italy. At the Battle of Loano on 22 November 1795, Cassagne was wounded in the left thigh while attacking the Rocca Barbena position.

In 1796 Cassagne led the scouts of the left wing of André Masséna's division. Ordered to pursue the Austrians after the Battle of Lonato, he was seriously wounded by a musket shot in the chest on 3 August near Lake Garda. Still leading his scouts, he forced a body of Austrian cavalry to surrender on 16 January 1797 near Mantua. He was shot in the left leg at the Battle of Tarvis in March. During the campaign in Egypt, Cassagne commanded the scouts of Louis André Bon's division. He fought at the Battle of the Pyramids in 1798 and at the Siege of Acre in 1799. At Acre he was stabbed twice in the left thigh, twice in the left arm and once in the hand. His wounding occurred on 29 May 1799 while storming a defensive work and killing every Turkish defender, at the cost of two-thirds of his own soldiers. He was promoted chef de bataillon for this action. Cassagne was shot through the thigh while fighting the British at the Battle of Alexandria on 21 March 1801. He was appointed colonel of the 25th Line Infantry Demi-brigade on 29 May of the same year.

After returning to France, Cassagne was assigned to defend Maubeuge until 1804 when he was sent to Bruges. He became an officer of the Legion of Honor on 4 June 1804. His regiment was placed in Charles-Étienne Gudin de La Sablonnière's division in the III Corps. He fought in the War of the Third Coalition in the Austrian Empire in 1805 and in the Kingdom of Prussia and Poland in 1806–1807. At the Battle of Auerstadt, the 25th Line Infantry Regiment captured two cannons from the Prussians and Cassagne was hit in the face by a bullet and had a horse killed under him. The 25th Line fought at the Battle of Pułtusk on 26 December 1806 and at the Battle of Eylau on 8 February 1807. Cassagne was promoted general of brigade on 7 June 1807. Napoleon raised him to the dignity of Baron of the Empire on 8 March 1808.

== Spain ==
Cassagne entered Spain as part of the 2nd Corps of Observation of the Gironde under Pierre Dupont de l'Étang. He was a brigade commander in Dominique Honoré Antoine Vedel's 6,884-man division. The division consisted of one battalion of the 3rd Swiss Regiment and three battalions each of the 1st and 5th Legions of the Reserve. In 1807, Napoleon summoned for duty the young men from the classes of 1808 and 1809. Even after the regular regiments were made up to full strength, there remained a glut of conscripts. These raw troops were formed into the Legions of Reserve. In May 1808, Napoleon directed Dupont to seize Seville in the south of Spain. In Dupont's entire force there was only one battalion of veterans. On 2–3 July Dupont ordered one of Vedel's brigades to march to the city of Jaén and the raid was a success. According to his service record, Cassagne was wounded at Jaén on 2 July.

After a series of grievous blunders by Dupont and Vedel, Dupont surrendered the survivors of his 10,000 men after the Battle of Bailén on 20 July 1808. Even though Vedel was not surrounded, he meekly surrendered his division a few days later. Cassagne argued forcefully against surrendering but he was not in a position to change the terms of the capitulation. His opposition reached the ears of Napoleon so Bailén did not blight his career. Cassagne and the other generals were immediately released, but the Spanish violated the terms of the surrender. They were supposed to repatriate the captured troops back to France. Instead they held them until 1814 under terrible conditions and half of the men died. Dupont, Vedel, Armand Samuel de Marescot, Théodore Chabert and François Marie Guillaume Legendre d'Harvesse were imprisoned by Napoleon for nine months, then released. Dupont was sent back to prison in 1812–1814, but the others were pardoned or put on half-pay.

Sent back to Spain, Cassagne took command of a brigade in the I Corps in April 1809. He led his troops at the Battle of Talavera on 27–28 July. On the second day, Marshal Claude Perrin Victor ordered the divisions of François Amable Ruffin and Eugène-Casimir Villatte to turn the Allied left flank. Ruffin deployed on the extreme right and Cassagne's brigade of Villatte's division was to Ruffin's left. As Cassagne's brigade edged forward, the 27th Light and 63rd Line Infantry Regiments were charged by the British 23rd Light Dragoons. The British cavalry galloped unwittingly into an unseen streambed, dismounting many troopers and throwing the regiment into disorder. After quickly realigning their ranks, the two left squadrons charged the 27th Light, which was formed into a large square, and were driven off with considerable loss. The two right squadrons rode past the square, plunged into a French cavalry brigade and were cut to pieces. The 23rd Light Dragoons lost 207 killed, wounded and captured out of a total of 450 in this combat. Cassagne's two regiments suffered approximately 200 casualties from Allied artillery fire.

The Siege of Cádiz lasted from 5 February 1810 to 25 August 1812 and occupied the attentions of Victor's corps. In February 1811, Victor had 19,000 French soldiers besieging 20,000 Spanish and 5,000–6,000 Anglo-Portuguese troops in Cádiz. Leaving 7,000 mostly Spanish troops to hold Cádiz, the Allies gathered a force of 9,600 Spanish and 5,000 British troops to be landed by ship behind the French lines. Manuel Lapeña assumed overall command of the expedition while Thomas Graham, 1st Baron Lynedoch led the Anglo-Portuguese division. The object of the expedition was to break the siege. On 23 February, Spanish partisans skirmished with Cassagne on 23 February 1811, who held Medina-Sidonia with two battalions. Alerted, Victor reinforced Cassagne with three battalions and a cavalry regiment, to make a total of 3,000 men. On 4 March Cassagne reported that the Allied column was no longer headed for Medina-Sidonia, but was on a road farther west. Victor ordered Cassagne to march to join the rest of the corps near Chiclana de la Frontera on the morning of 5 March if no Allied units were nearby. However, Cassagne started late in the morning and Victor attacked without him and was defeated by Graham's division in the Battle of Barrosa on 5 March. Cassagne arrived only in time to rally the beaten troops and temporarily take command of Villatte's division after that general was wounded. Given command of the rearguard, Cassagne found that his position was not disturbed. Though the Allies won the battle, Lapeña supinely retreated within Cádiz without breaking the siege.

An Army of the South organization of 3 March 1812 showed Cassagne leading the 1st Brigade of the 2nd Division under Pierre Barrois. The brigade consisted of three battalions each of the 16th Light and 8th Line Infantry Regiments. He was promoted general of division on 30 May 1813. Though still with the Army of the South, his division was attached to the Army of the Center under Jean-Baptiste Drouet, comte d'Erlon at the Battle of Vitoria on 21 June 1813. At Vitoria, Joseph Braun commanded the brigade that included the 16th Light and 8th Line while Jacques Blondeau led the brigade that comprised the 51st and 54th Line. Cassagne's division counted 95 officers and 5,114 men. The division's losses at Vitoria were modest: nine killed, 76 wounded and 178 missing, for a total of 263 casualties.

== Germany 1813 ==
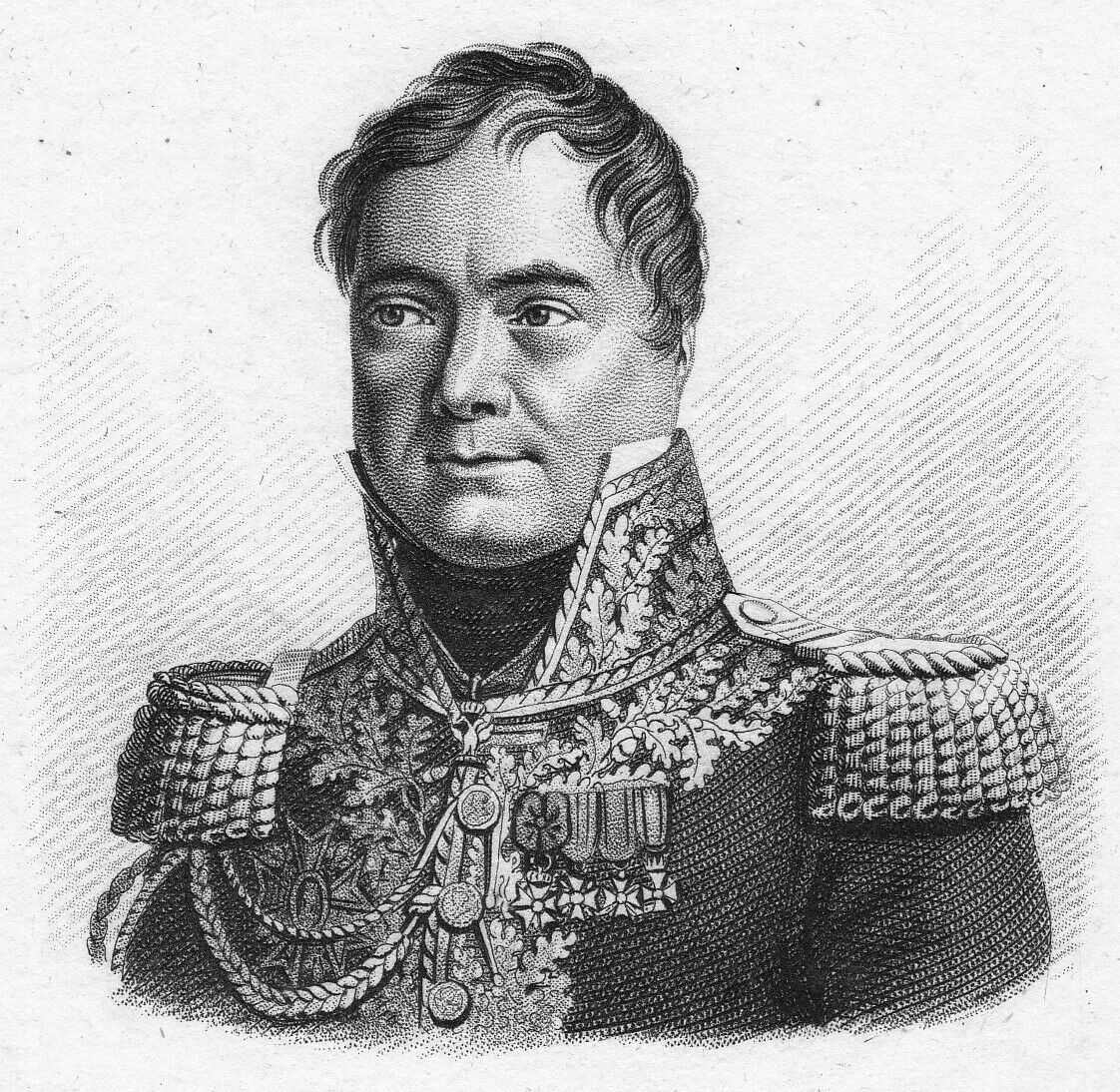
Georges Mouton

Ordered to travel to Mainz, Cassagne was assigned to command of the 1st Division of the I Corps. The 7th Light, 12th Line and 17th Line Regiments suffered extremely heavy losses at the Battle of Kulm on 29–30 August. It is not clear that Cassagne was present at Kulm because his name is not mentioned in historian Francis Loraine Petre's account, unlike other division commanders like Jean-Baptiste Dumonceau and Armand Philippon. At Kulm on the first day, Dominique Vandamme's 38,000 French faced 14,700, rising to 20,000 Allies. That day each side lost about 6,000 men. On the second day, Vandamme's 32,000 fought 44,000 Allies before being attacked from behind by a Prussian corps. Vandamme was captured and his forces lost 15,000 men, including 10,000 prisoners. The Allies admitted losing 3,319 men.

After the Kulm disaster, the I Corps was rebuilt and placed under Georges Mouton, Count Lobau. On 7 September 1813, Cassagne's 1st Division had two brigades. The 1st Brigade (no commander given) included the 1st and 2nd Battalions of the 7th Light (1,022 men) and 12th Line (1,547 men) Infantry Regiments. The 2nd Brigade under Raymond Aimery de Fezensac consisted of the 1st and 2nd Battalions of the 17th Line (1,531 men) and the 3rd Battalion of the 36th Line (446 men). Attached were the 8/2nd Foot Artillery (65 men) and 23/3rd Foot Artillery (57 men) Companies and detachments (125 men) from the 1st, 1st bis and 14th Artillery Train Battalions. On 14 September, the I Corps was involved in a clash at Berggiesshübel. By 25 September, by combat and sickness, the strength of the 7th Light had shrunk to 643 men, the 12th Line to 976 men, the 17th Line to 736 men and the 36th Line to 413 men. That day found Lobau's corps still near Berggiesshübel, while at the end of the month the corps was south of Dresden.

In early October, Napoleon worried whether he should leave a strong garrison in Dresden or abandon the city and add the troops to his army. On 7 October he finally decided to leave the I Corps and the XIV Corps under Marshal Laurent Gouvion Saint-Cyr in Dresden. Not concentrating every soldier for a major battle proved to be a serious error. The two corps were sorely missed on 16 October in the Battle of Leipzig. In the event, Saint-Cyr's troops were blockaded in Dresden after Napoleon's defeat. On 11 November, Saint-Cyr surrendered on the pledge that his soldiers would be paroled to France on the promise not to fight the Allies for the remainder of the war. As the men were on the march home, the Allies reneged on the agreement and the French soldiers became prisoners of war. Altogether, 36,000 troops marched into captivity in the Austrian Empire. Cassagne was held prisoner in Hungary.

== Later career ==
After his release when the war ended, Cassagne was awarded the Order of Saint Louis and given command of the Haute-Garonne department during the Bourbon Restoration. During the Hundred Days he rallied to Napoleon and was assigned to lead an observation force in the eastern Pyrenees. After the second Bourbon Restoration, Cassagne was placed in inactive status and barely escaped being lynched by Royalists in the south of France. He was returned to favor after the French Revolution of 1830. He was recalled to active duty on 3 January 1833 and assigned to the 2nd Section of the Army General Staff on 15 August 1839. He died at Toulouse on 6 July 1841. His name is on the south pillar of the Arc de Triomphe. Cassagne is buried in the Terre-Cabade Cemetery in Toulouse.
