= Jacques Gervais, baron Subervie =

French general and politician (1776–1856)

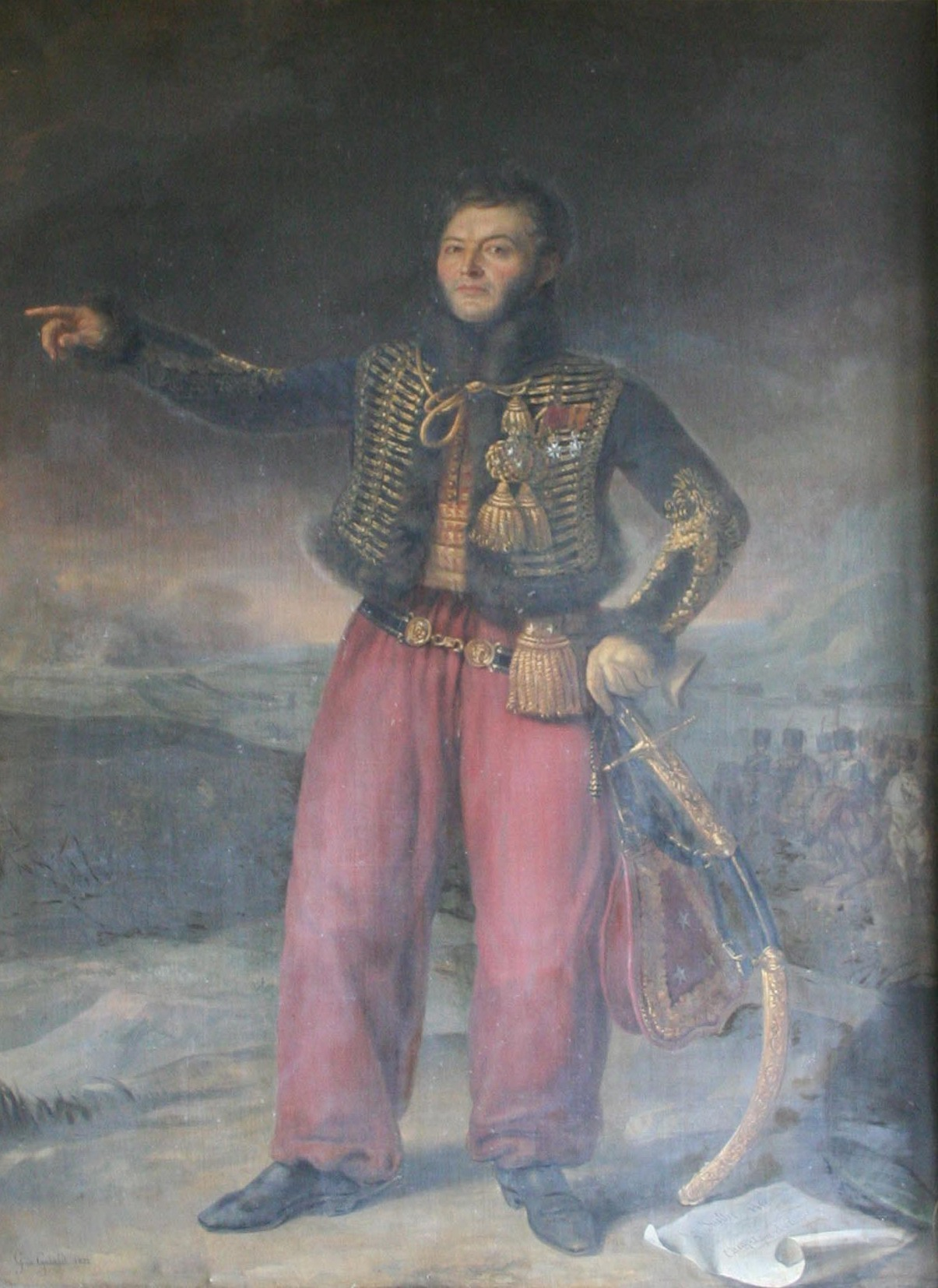
- Portrait of Jacques-Gervais Subervie by Gustave de Galard
- Born: 1 September 1776; Lectoure (France)
- Died: 10 March 1856 (aged 79) (France)
- Occupation: Politician, military personnel
- Awards: Commander of the Legion of Honour (1830); Grand Cross of the Legion of Honor (1848); Chevalier of the Legion of Honour (1804); Officer of the Legion of Honor (1807); Grand Officer of the Legion of Honour (1840)
- Position held: deputy (1831–1834), Minister of War (1848–1848), deputy (1834–1837), deputy (1839–1842), deputy (1842–1846), deputy (1846–1848), deputy (1848–1849), deputy (1849–1851)
- Rank: brigadier general, chef d'escadron, colonel, divisional general
- Titles: Baron of the First French Empire (1810–)

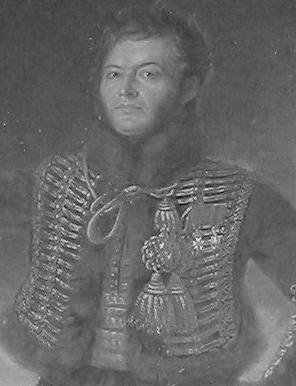
Portrait of General Subervie, early 19th century

Jacques Gervais, baron Subervie (French: [ʒak ʒɛʁvɛ də sybɛʁvi]; 1 September 1776, Lectoure, Gers – 10 March 1856) was a French general and politician.

== Military career ==
Subervie served as a French commander during the Napoleonic Wars, during which he mainly commanded cavalry troops.

Subervie was promoted colonel on 27 December 1805 and appointed to command the 10th Chasseurs à Cheval Regiment.

On 21 March 1809 while in pursuit of a Spanish army, Subervie's 10th Chasseurs à Cheval Regiment fell into a deadly ambush. Spanish General Henestrosa noticed that the 10th Chasseurs had outstripped the other regiments in Antoine Charles Louis de Lasalle's division. Henestrosa concealed the Almanza and Infante Cavalry Regiments on either side of the main road near the village of Miajadas. When Subervie ordered his horsemen to charge a troop of Spanish horsemen that were deployed on the highway, he found his regiment surrounded by the Almanza and Infante Regiments. The 10th Chasseurs lost one officer and 62 men killed and 70 wounded before they fought their way out of the trap. In the Battle of Medellín on 28 March, Lasalle's four light cavalry regiments drove off the Spanish right wing cavalry and then charged the infantry. After putting up a good fight, the infantry finally took to its heels. A French participant recorded that the chasseurs were particularly brutal during the pursuit of the fleeing Spanish, cutting them down without mercy in revenge for their drubbing at Miajadas.

At the Battle of Talavera on 27–28 July 1809, Christophe Antoine Merlin's cavalry brigade consisted of the 10th and 26th Chasseurs à Cheval, Polish Lancer and Westphalian Chevau-léger Regiments. Toward the end of the battle, the British army commander Sir Arthur Wellesley directed William Anson's cavalry brigade to charge the French. About 150 yards (137 m) in front of the French defenders, the 1st Hussars of the King's German Legion and the British 23rd Light Dragoons charged into a hidden watercourse which lamed many horses and threw their riders to the ground. Quickly reforming, the Germans and the two left wing squadrons of the 23rd LD charged the French infantry drawn up in squares and were driven away. The two right wing squadrons rode around the squares and charged Merlin's cavalry brigade. The 10th and 26th Chasseurs in the front line drew aside, letting the 23rd LD gallop past. After the two British squadrons crashed into the Westphalians in the second line, 10th and 26th Chasseurs charged their enemies from the rear. Only a few British horsemen escaped the trap. The 23rd Light Dragoons lost 207 killed, wounded and captured out of 450 horsemen in the battle.

Subervie was made a Baron of the Empire on 28 November 1809 and general of brigade on 6 August 1811.

During the Battle of Dresden on 26–27 August 1813, Subervie led the 9th Light Cavalry Division in the V Cavalry Corps under Pierre Claude Pajol. Only the 26th and 27th Chasseurs à Cheval were engaged. At the Battle of Leipzig on 16–19 October 1813, Subervie's 9th Light Cavalry Division was 1,700-strong. Stanislaus Klicky's brigade consisted of the 3rd Hussars and 27th Chasseurs à Cheval while Jacques Laurent Vial's brigade was made up of the 14th and 26th Chasseurs à Cheval and the 13th Hussars.

He was made general de division in early April 1814, a promotion which was annulled a couple of days later.

During the Hundred Days, Subervie was given the 5th cavalry division (1,487 men and 6 guns) in the I Cavalry Corps of General Pajol with which he served in the Battle of Ligny. Detached from his parent corps, Subervie's division accompanied the Army of the North and Napoléon to Waterloo. At Waterloo, after the emperor noted that the Prussians were marching to aid the Duke of Wellington, he was sent together with Lobau's VI Infantry Corps to hold the French right flank while the emperor faced Wellington. In this capacity he was involved in fighting the Prussians around Plancenoit.

He was laid off at the Bourbon Restoration and retired in 1825.

== Later life ==
Elected in 1834, he was continually reelected until 1848, except between 1839 and 1842, and was part of the liberal opposition. For elections to the Constituent Assembly, he was elected as a Republican by the department of Eure-et-Loir and was reelected to the Legislature.

Subervie served as Inspector-General of cavalry in 1840. He served as the Provisional Government of the French Second Republic's Minister of War from February 25, 1848 to March 20, 1848. He resigned March 19, when he was appointed Chancellor of the Legion of Honor.

Subervie was a Grand Officier of the Légion d'honneur and held the title of Baron d’Empire during the Second French Empire.

After the coup of December 2, Subervie retired from public life and died in 1856.

== Notes ==
Political offices
Preceded by Marie Alphonse Bedeau	Minister of War; February 25, 1848 – March 20, 1848	Succeeded by Louis Eugène Cavaignac
