= Antonio Begines =

Spanish army officer (c. 1753 – 1813)

Antonio Begines de los Ríos y Bejerano (c. 1753 – 4 November 1813) was a Spanish military commander. (Note: Some Spanish sources also spell the surname Bejines. British sources, such as Oman (1911) and Napier (1839) spell it Beguines.)

== Early career ==
Born in Seville, as a cadet he saw action at Melilla in 1774. He sailed to South America in 1776 as a second lietenanant, returning to Spain to take part in the siege of Gibraltar until the end of 1781. In 1782–1783 he was again stationed in América.

Promoted to captain in 1789, he then saw action in the War of the Pyrenees.

== Peninsular War ==
He was promoted to Infantry colonel in 1808, serving with the Infantry Regiment of Granada.

According to the Gazeta de Madrid of 4 November 1808, Colonel Begines, at the head of the Baza Regiment had passed through the city of Murcia the previous month on its way to Catalonia, as had the Artillery convoy of General Reding's Army of Granada, under Brigadier Gacitúa, and 658 hussars under the Marquis de Campverde.

He was taken prisoner at Gerona in 1809, but managed to escape and made his way to join Blake's army at Isla de León. Promoted to brigadier in June 1810, later that year he was given the command of the 1st Division of the 4th Army.

The December 1810 decree (published 11 January 1811), which re-structured the Spanish Army into seven armies, incorporated the area of Campo de Gibraltar into the 4th Army, under the command of Lieutenant general, the Marquis de Coupigny, with two vanguard divisions under Zayas and Lardizabal. Begines was appointed commander of the Campo de Gibraltar, substituting the Marquis de Portago.

Following the Battle of Barrosa (March 1811), Begines, with three battalions, was based around the mountains of Ronda. On the 8th, at Medina Sidonia, his troops repulsed a French column of 600 men, led by General Cassagne, that had come to occupy the town. However, the following day they were forced to withdraw towards San Roque and Algeciras when French reinforcements approached.

On 3 June 1811, at Dehesa de Gaena, between Olvera and Morón, Begines, at the head of 400 infantry and 250 horse ambushed a battalion of 500 Polish troops who were on their way to reinforce the French troops at Ronda. Later that month he was promoted to field marshal.

At the end of August 1811, he was substituted as commander of the Campo de Gibraltar by Lieutenant general Francisco Ballesteros. However, Ballesteros proved himself very unpopular in Andalusia and the Regency received several complaints about him. Matters came to a head when Ballesteros refused to accept Wellington's appointment as commander-in-chief of the Spanish Army and was relieved of his command, with Duke del Parque taking over command of the 4th Army. Begines, now a field marshal, was appointed the prosecutor for Ballesteros's court martial.

Begines was appointed governor of Madrid and captain general of New Castile on 1 June 1813.

== Bibliography ==
- Napier, William Francis Patrick (1839). History of the War in the Peninsula and in the South of France, From the Year 1807 to the Year 1814, Volume 2.
