= Grand Battery =

Artillery tactic of Napoleonic France

Grand Battery (Grande Batterie, meaning big or great battery) was a French artillery tactic of the Napoleonic Wars. It involved massing batteries into a single large, temporary battery, and concentrating the firepower of their guns at a single point in the enemy's lines which could lead to a split in the line.

Substituting volume of fire for accuracy, a rate of fire and rapid movement, it was rarely used in the wars' early years. As the quality of artillery crews and their horses declined, it was employed more frequently during later (post-1808) campaigns.

At Wagram some of Archduke Charles' troops would lay down instead of standing in the open to reduce casualties from heavy artillery fire. One of such actions is described by Austrian officer Karl Varnhagen von Ense and his 47th Infantry Regiment. During the last battle at Waterloo in 1815 a grand battery was put together to fire at Wellington's position though to small effect.

== Napoleonic wars ==
The Grand Battery was often concentrated against the enemy's center. An early example of this is at Austerlitz in 1805, when Napoleon ordered a "roar of thunder" before the main assault upon the Pratzen Heights, which split the coalition's lines in half. Another example of the tactic in use was General Sénarmont's aggressive use of his guns at the Battle of Friedland (1807), which was a major factor that won the battle. The same tactic was used during the Battle of Wagram in 1809, where a grand battery of 112 guns successfully halted an Austrian counterattack, but the Austrians managed to reduce losses thanks to the tactics of lying down. At Borodino in 1812, it was again used to break a counterattack. It initially failed to break the strong Russian positions and earthworks in the center along the Raevsky Redoubt. The earthworks were captured in the end, but the Russian lines remained unbroken, probably because Napoleon did not follow up his successes with the Guard.

At the Battle of Lützen (1813), it succeeded in breaking the Russo-Prussian center, ahead of the main assault by the imperial guard. In 1815 at Waterloo, the famous opening barrage of the Grande Batterie failed to break the center of Wellington's Anglo-allied army due to his deployment of most of his forces behind the reverse slopes of the rolling hillside and the fact that the ground was still wet and muddy, preventing the usual effects of the bouncing cannonballs.

== American Civil War ==
In 1863 on the third day of the Battle of Gettysburg, Robert E. Lee, formed a Grand Battery of his own in a desperate attempt to weaken the Union center in advance of Pickett's Charge. The artillery overshot most of their targets and had to cease fire due to a lack of ammunition.
