= Begines =

Begines is a Spanish surname. Notable people with the surname include:

- Antonio Begines (c. 1753–1813), Spanish military officer
- Armando Begines (born 1983), Mexican footballer
- Everaldo Begines (born 1971), Mexican footballer and manager
