= IX Corps (Grande Armée) =

- Active: 1806–1807; 1812–1813
- Country: First French Empire
- Branch: French Imperial Army
- Size: Corps
- Engagements: War of the Fourth Coalition; Russian campaign War of the Sixth Coalition

Commanders
- Notable commanders: Pierre Augereau; Jean-Baptiste Bernadotte; Jérôme Bonaparte; Jean-Baptiste Drouet; Claude Victor-Perrin

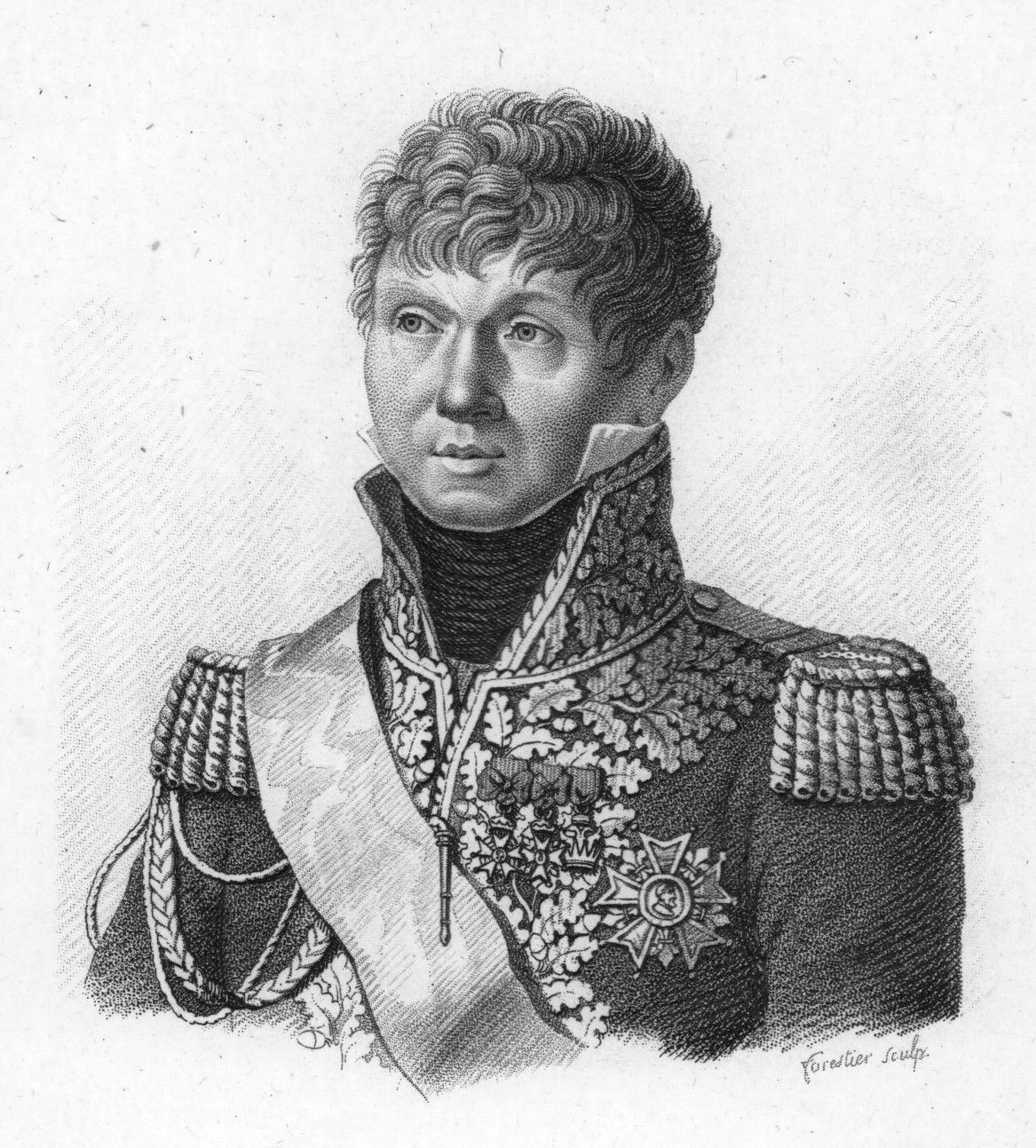
Claude Victor-Perrin

The IX Corps of the Grande Armée was a French military unit that existed during the Napoleonic Wars. The corps was first formed in 1806 from German troops allied with the First French Empire, with Emperor Napoleon I appointing his brother Jérôme Bonaparte as commander. During 1807, elements of the corps besieged several Prussian fortresses.

The IX Corps was reformed in 1812 for the French invasion of Russia and Marshal Claude Victor-Perrin was assigned to lead it. Victor's troops fought in several actions, most notably at the Battle of Berezina in November. The formation was re-established in 1813 with Marshal Pierre Augereau as its commander and fought at Leipzig.

== Order of battle ==
=== Leipzig, 1813 ===
IX Corps: Marshal Pierre Augereau

- 51st Division: General of Division Louis Marie Turreau
  - Brigade: General of Brigade Henri-Jacques Martin de Lagarde
    - 32nd Provisional Regiment (2 battalions)
    - 63rd Line Infantry Regiment (1 battalion)
  - Brigade: General of Brigade Antoine Aymard
    - 34th Provisional Regiment (2 battalions)
    - 35th Provisional Regiment (2 battalions)
- 52nd Division: General of Division Jean-Baptiste Pierre de Semellé
  - Brigade: General of Brigade François Bagneris
    - 37th Provisional Regiment (2 battalions)
    - 39th Line Infantry Regiment (1 battalion)
  - Brigade: General of Brigade Roch Godart
    - 86th Line Infantry Regiment (1 battalion)
    - 121st Line Infantry Regiment (1 battalion)
- Artillery: General of Brigade Joseph Pellegrin de Millon
  - 5 foot artillery batteries
