= François Amable Ruffin =

French general (1771–1811)

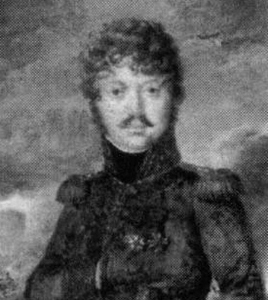
General of Division François Amable Ruffin

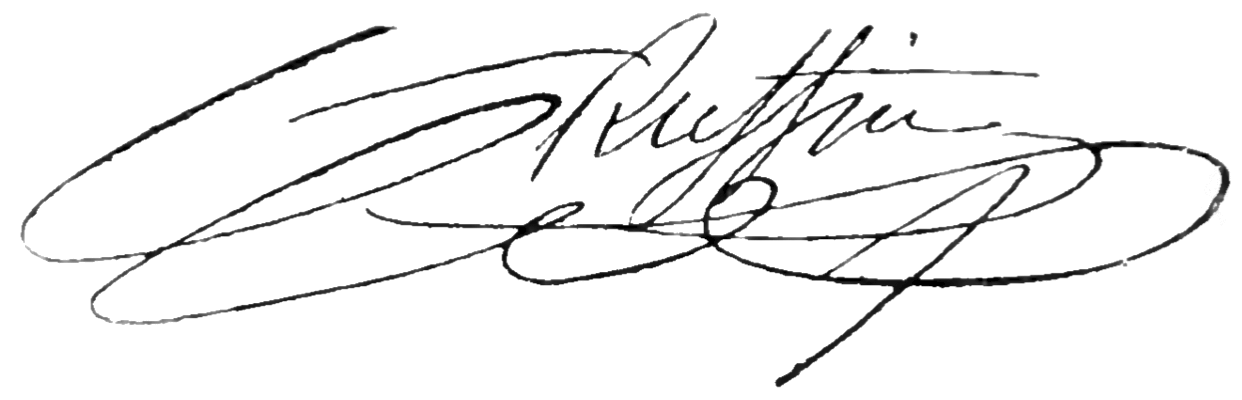
Signature

François Amable Ruffin (French pronunciation: [fʁɑ̃swa amabl ʁyfɛ̃]; 31 August 1771 – 15 May 1811) was a general of division in Napoleon's First French Empire. He was mortally wounded while leading his troops against the British at Barrosa, Spain (March 1811).

== Biography ==
Having been captain of a company of volunteers from Bolbec, he was named commander of the 7th Battalion of Seine-Inférieure on 20 September 1792. He fought in the French Revolution and subsequently in the battles of the First French Empire, seeing action at the Battle of Austerlitz in 1805 and the Battle of Heilsberg in 1807. His conduct at the Battle of Friedland in 1807 saw him given the title of comte de l'Empire and promoted to general of division (général de division), and he took command of Marshal Victor's I Corps.

Ruffin joined the Peninsular War, leading I Corps into Spain in September 1808. He served at Somosierra, Ucles, Medellin and Talavera, before commanding one of Victor's divisions at the Battle of Barrosa on 5 March 1811. During the battle for the Barrosa Ridge, Ruffin was shot through the neck, causing him to be paralysed. He was captured by the British army and shipped to England. Although he appeared to be recovering from his wound, he suffered a relapse on the voyage and died aboard the transport Gorgon on 15 May.

He was buried with full military honours at Portsmouth, and RUFFIN is one of the names inscribed under the Arc de Triomphe in Paris.
