= José Pascual de Zayas y Chacón =

Spanish military officer (1772–1827)

José Pascual de Zayas Chacón
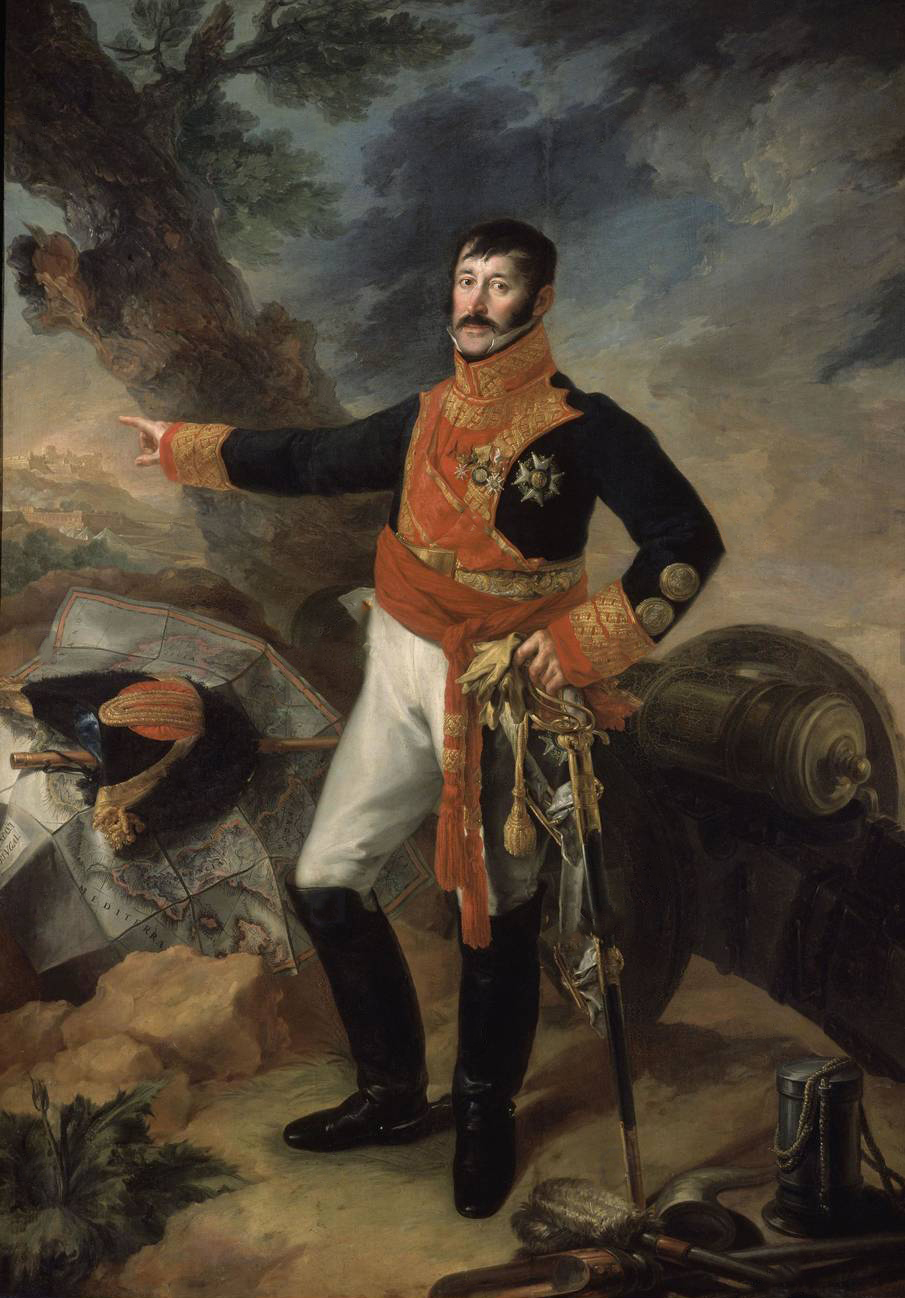
- Portrait by Vicente López Portaña, c. 1818
- Born: 1772; La Habana, Cuba
- Died: 27 October 1827 (aged 55); Chiclana, Cádiz
- Military career
- Allegiance: Spain
- Branch: Spanish Army
- Conflicts: Peninsular War

José Pascual de Zayas Chacón (1772 – 27 October 1827) was a Spanish military officer and deputy of the Cortes of Cádiz, representing La Habana. As a leading Spanish Army general in the Peninsular War, he is renowned for his great skill and daring, in particular for his initiative at the Battle of Albuera.

== Military career ==
Born on Cuba, he was sent to mainland Spain to join the Asturias Regiment as a cadet in 1783. He first saw action, as a second lieutenant, in Oran, where he was wounded. He later had to be rescued from the rubble following the 1790 Oran earthquake.

Seconded to the Army of Navarra, he saw action in several combats against French forces in the French Revolutionary Wars. Captured in July 1793, he was held prisoner until the following year.

Following the signing of the Peace of Basel (1795), which signalled the end of the War of the Pyrenees, his unit was sent to escort the fleet headed for Veracruz.

In 1800 he was wounded in the defence of Ferrol against the British attack on the city.

In 1801 he was promoted to Captain in the Asturias Regiment.

In 1805, General O’Farrill appointed him his aide de camp for the expedition to Etruria to escort the King and Queen of Etruria, the young Louis II and his mother, the regent, Infanta Maria Luisa of Spain back to Spain. Zayas remained in Florence until the end of 1807.

=== Peninsular War ===
Back in Spain, he was promoted to major in 1808 with orders to join the Princess's Regiment stationed in Denmark. However, the events leading up to the Dos de Mayo Uprising caught him in Madrid and his earlier collaboration with O’Farrill, now a member of the provisional Supreme Central Junta, enabled him to accompany Evaristo Pérez de Castro to Bayonne at the end of April 1808 with the mission of contacting members of the circle close to Fernando VII, then being held in captivity by Napoleon. The mission was aborted when, on crossing the border into France they were detained and sent back to Spain.

Back in Madrid, Zayas was then ordered to La Coruña to oversee the embarking of troops bound for Buenos Aires, but he stopped in Valladolid to join the forces the Captain-general of Old Castile, García de la Cuesta, was recruiting there. Cuesta appointed Zayas Major-general of Infantry, and he fought at Cabezón (June 1808), the first battle of Spain's War of Independence, and a resounding defeat for the Spanish forces.

He was then sent on to La Coruña to ensure the Junta de Galicia's support for Blake's Army of Galicia. In mid-July, the combined forces of Blake and Cuesta were heavily defeated by a smaller French force under Marshal Bessières at Medina de Rioseco. The defeat, due mainly to the lack of co-ordination between the two military commanders, was mitigated only by Zayas' strategic retreat towards Salamanca.

The following August Zayas was promoted to colonel. With the Supreme Central Junta's lack of confidence in Cuesta, the Army of Castile was dissolved and what remained, including Zayas, was incorporated into the newly formed Army of the Centre, led by Castaños.

Zayas was again on the losing side, the following November, at Tudela and, again, at Bubierca.

In December, what was left of the Army of the Centre, now under the orders of the Duke of the Infantado, Pedro de Alcántara Álvarez de Toledo, regrouped in Cuenca, with Zayas participating at Tarancón, the first time these troops were able to score a major victory by repelling several French cavalry attacks.

With Cuesta rehabilitated and appointed commander of the Army of Estremadura, he requested the services of Zayas who, at the beginning of January 1809, was given the command of the Jaen Regiment which fought at Mesas de Ibor (17 March 1809), and covered the Army of Estremadura's retreat from said battle.

He was again wounded, this time at Medellín (March 1809), while leading an attack on an enemy battery.

Promoted to brigadier the following month, Zayas was given command of the Army of Estremadura's vanguard, at the head of which he fought at Talavera (July 1809), and following which he was promoted to field marshal.

The following September, the vanguard commanded by Zayas, by now considered the army's best unit, was incorporated into the Army of the Centre and would participate at Ocaña (November 1809) where, despite the routing of the Spanish forces, Zayas' vanguard was able to cover the disorderly retreat.

In March 1810 Zayas managed to reach Cádiz, where he was able to concentrate on training his troops. On 15 August 1810, at the head of the 4th Division (Infantry) of the Army of the Centre stationed at Cadiz and Isla de León, Zayas had an effective force of 342 officers and 5,661 troops. By September, his infantry division had increased to an effective force of 530 officers and 7,376 troops.

In early March 1811, Zayas participated at Barrosa, near Cadiz. By the beginning of May 1811, his division, now incorporated into the 4th Army, had been reduced to an effective force of 278 officers and 5,878 troops. Later that month, Zayas' division fought at Albuera under the orders of Blake, with Zayas' troops once again standing out as "fortunately for the Allies, their flank was now held by the best Spanish troops on the field: battalions that had been drilled and trained for months... by Zayas himself".

In April 1811, Zayas was sent with his six thousand men to join Ballesteros in Estremadura. However, on landing at Moguer, Zayas was forced to retreat when faced by the seven battalions and two regiments of cavalry under General Maransin that Marshal Soult had sent to intercept them.

Later that year, still under Blake's orders, his division was transferred to the Levante to participate in the defence of Valencia.

He distinguished himself at Saguntum (October 1811), where he led a 2,550-strong division of Blake's 1st Army ("Expeditionary Corps") and in December at the defence of Mislata, but in January 1812, when the Siege of Valencia came to an end, with Blake capitulating to Marshal Suchet, Zayas and Blake were taken prisoner and interned at Vincennes.

Zayas was released in December 1813 in order to accompany the Duke of San Carlos in negotiating the return of Ferdinand VII before the Cortes. Finally, however, Zayas only accompanied the King on his return to Spain. He was promoted to Lieutenant general in March 1814.

=== Trienio Liberal ===
In July 1820 he was appointed deputy in the Cortes for La Habana and, at the end of that same month, captain general of Estremadura.

On 7 July 1822, Zayas participated in the defence of the Royal Palace of Madrid during the failed coup d'etat carried out by the Absolutist forces and in 1823, at the head of the liberal government's troops in Madrid, refused to hand the city over to the Duke of Angoulême's Royalist troops, combatting them until the Duke himself arrived at the head of the so-called army of the Hundred Thousand Sons of Saint Louis towards the end of May. Forced to flee, Zayas took refuge in Málaga.

On 30 May 1823, Zayas was stripped of all his posts and honours and in November 1826, he was declared an "impure liberal and mason".

Zayas died in Chiclana in 1827. A royal decree of 2 August 1840 restored all his previously held posts and honours.
