= Juan Henestrosa =

Spanish army officer (1765–1831)

- Born: 28 June 1765; Écija, Seville
- Died: 19 December 1831 (aged 66) Madrid
- Conflicts: Peninsular War

Juan de la Cruz Fernández de Henestrosa y Horcasitas (1765–1831) was a Spanish military commander.

== Early career ==
Appointed lieutenant colonel of the María Luisa Regiment of Hussars at the beginning of 1801, Henestrosa saw action during the War of the Oranges.

== Peninsular War ==
Having been given command of the Regiment of Light Infantry Volunteers of Spain in August 1807, he refused to obey orders to join French General Dupont's forces, (Note: Some six weeks after Junot, with his 25,000-strong Corps of Observation of the Gironde, had crossed into Spain on his way to Portugal, the following November Dupont's Second Corps of Observation of the Gironde, also crossed the Spanish frontier. (Oman, 1902: pp. 26, 34.)) and instead marched his regiment to Extremadura, for which he was promoted to brigadier in June 1808 by the local Junta. By October that year, Henestrosa was leading the 2nd Division of Galluzo's 12,800-strong Army of Extremadura, an army which the following month, then under the command of the Conde de Belvedere, would be routed at Gamonal.

=== 1809 ===
He was promoted to lieutenant general of Cavalry following the Battle of Medellín (28 March 1809).

== Post-war career ==
Henestrosa was appointed captain general of Spain's Royal Armies in 1825.
