= Alexandre-Antoine Hureau de Sénarmont =

French general (1769–1810)

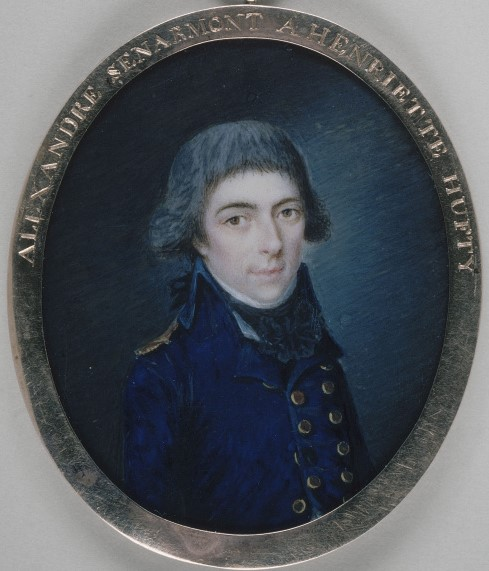
Portrait miniature, 1790s

Alexandre-Antoine Hureau, baron de Sénarmont (French pronunciation: [alɛksɑ̃dʁ ɑ̃twan yʁo də senaʁmɔ̃]; 21 April 1769 – 26 October 1810) was a French artillery general.

He was born in Strasbourg and educated at the Metz school for engineer and artillery cadets. In 1785, he was commissioned in the artillery, in which he served as a regimental officer for fifteen years. In 1800, he won great credit both by his exertions in bringing the artillery of the Army of Reserve over the Alps and by his handling of guns in the Battle of Marengo. In 1806, as a brigadier general and commander of the artillery of an army corps, he took part in the Jena and Eylau.

But he is remembered chiefly for the case shot attack, which was the central feature of Napoleon's matured tactical system and which Sénarmont put into execution for the first time at the Battle of Friedland. In the battle he was chief of artillery for the 1st corps and demonstrated the case shot for good effect on the masses of Russian infantry. For this feat, he was made a baron, and in 1808, he was promoted to divisional general by Napoleon on the field of battle in front of Madrid. He was killed at the Siege of Cádiz in October 1810.

In 1811, an urn with his heart was interred in the Panthéon, Paris.
