= Claude-Victor Perrin =

French military commander (1764–1841)

Marshal of the Empire Claude-Victor Perrin Duke of Belluno
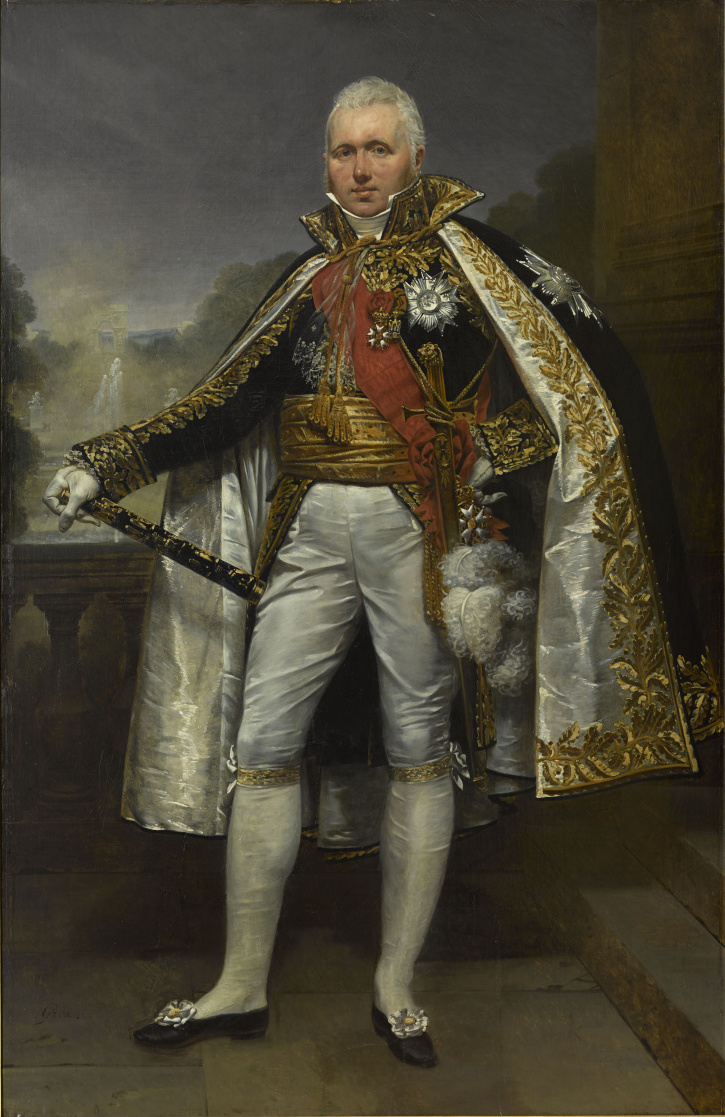
- Portrait by Antoine-Jean Gros, 1812

Minister of War
- In office 14 December 1821 – 19 October 1823
- Preceded by: Victor de Fay de La Tour-Maubourg
- Succeeded by: Ange Hyacinthe Maxence de Damas

Personal details
- Born: 7 December 1764 Lamarche, France
- Died: 1 March 1841 (aged 76) Paris, France
- Resting place: Père Lachaise Cemetery
- Awards: Grand Cross of the Legion of Honour

Military service
- Branch/service: French Army
- Years of service: 1781–1830
- Rank: Marshal of the Empire
- Commands: X Corps; I Corps; IX Corps; II Corps
- Battles/wars: French Revolutionary Wars; • Battle of Faenza; Napoleonic Wars; • Siege of Kolberg; • Battle of Espinosa de los Monteros; • Battle of Uclés; • Battle of Medellín; • Battle of Alcántara; • Siege of Cádiz; • Battle of Barrosa; • Battle of Chashniki; • Battle of Smoliani; • Battle of Berezina

Claude-Victor Perrin, Duke of Belluno (English: /ˈpɛræn/ PEH-ræn, French: [klod viktɔʁ pɛʁɛ̃]; 7 December 1764 – 1 March 1841) was a French military commander who served during the French Revolutionary Wars and the Napoleonic Wars. He was made a Marshal of the Empire in 1807 by Emperor Napoleon I.

== Early life ==
Victor was born in Lamarche on 7 December 1764 to Charles Perrin and Marie Anne Floriot. In 1781, he enlisted in an artillery regiment in Grenoble as a drummer, and after ten years' service he applied for and received his discharge. In Valence, on 16 May 1791 he married Jeanne Josephine Muguet, by whom he had issue which was extinct in the male line by 1917.

== French Revolutionary Wars ==
=== War of the First Coalition ===
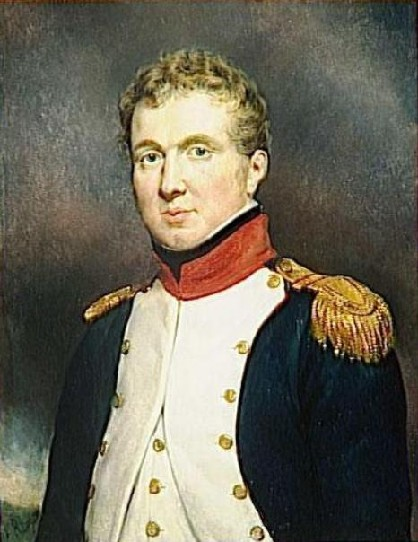
Victor as a lieutenant-colonel of 5th Bouches-du-Rhône Battalion in 1792, by Georges Rouget (1835)

In February 1792, Victor joined his hometown's National Guard as a grenadier. He then enlisted in the 1st Drôme Battalion, and later passed to the 5th Bouches-du-Rhône Battalion. In September 1792 he was made chief of battalion and deployed with the Army of Italy, distinguishing himself at the Battle of Coaraze. During the Siege of Toulon in late 1793, Victor distinguished himself in the capture of Fort Mont Faron, and was seriously wounded in the stomach during the capture of Fort de l'Eguillette at the end of the siege.

For his actions at Toulon, Victor received a provisional promotion to brigade general. Afterwards, he was sent to the Army of the Eastern Pyrenees and fought in the War of the Pyrenees from 1794 to 1795, where he served in the sieges of Collioure, Roses, and fought with distinction at the Battle of the Black Mountain in November 1794. Confirmed in his rank in June 1795, he returned to the Army of Italy, fighting at the Battle of Loano in November 1795.

Victor served brilliantly in the Italian campaign of 1796 under General Napoleon Bonaparte. He took part in the capture of Cosseria Castle (April 14) and the battles of Dego (April 15), Peschiera (August 6), and Rovereto (September 4). Soon after his promotion to general of division, in January 1797, he captured Imola and Ancona (which would later become the Anconine Republic) in the Papal States, seizing 120 artillery pieces and 4,000 rifles. In April 1797, his troops took part in the suppression of the Veronese Easter.

=== War of the Second Coalition ===
Victor then returned to France and was made commander of the 2nd military division in Nantes in March 1798, but was soon back in the Army of Italy. He served in the Italian campaign of 1799, and was present at the defeats of Trebbia (June 17–19), where he was injured, and Genola (November 4). The following year, he led his division at Montebello and distinguished himself at the Battle of Marengo.

Appointed general-in-chief of the Army of Batavia in July 1800, Victor held this command until August 1802, when he was named commander of a planned expedition to Louisiana. However, due to the disaster of that of Saint-Domingue, the expedition was cancelled and Victor returned to his previous command in June 1803. In that year he married for a second time in June at 's-Hertogenbosch to Julie Vosch van Avesaat (1781–1831), by whom he had an only daughter who died unmarried and without issue. In February 1805, he was appointed Ambassador to Denmark.

== Napoleonic Wars ==
=== War of the Fourth Coalition ===
On the outbreak of hostilities with Prussia, Victor became Chief of Staff of the 5th Army Corps under Marshal Jean Lannes, and fought at the battles of Saalfeld and Jena in October 1806, where he was wounded. He received the capitulation of Spandau on October 25, served at the Battle of Pultusk on December 26, and was placed at the head of the 10th Army Corps upon its formation.

In March 1807, Victor laid siege to Kolberg then Danzig before being captured by partisans of Ferdinand von Schill. He was soon exchanged for Prussian general Gebhard Leberecht von Blücher and immediately sent to the Siege of Graudenz. After replacing the wounded Marshal Jean Bernadotte as commander of the 1st Army Corps, in June 1807, Victor broke the center of the Russian army at the Battle of Friedland on June 14, for which he was made Marshal of the Empire by Napoleon on 13 July.

=== Peninsular War ===
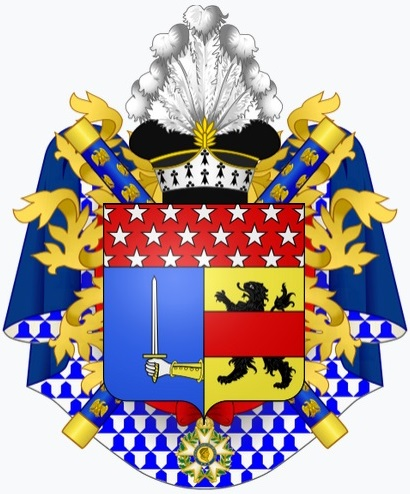
Heraldic achievement of Claude-Victor Perrin, Duke of Belluno

After the peace of Tilsit, Victor became governor of Berlin, and was created Duke of Belluno (Duc de Bellune) in September 1808, shortly before departing for the Peninsular War. He was victorious over the Spanish general Joaquín Blake y Joyes at the Battle of Espinosa on November 10–11, and took part in the Battle of Somosierra on November 30, subsequently marching on Toledo. He was again victorious at Uclès in January 1809, and as commander of the 1st Army Corps, he participated in the battles of Ybor (17 March), Valdecañas de Tajo (18 March), and finally Medellín (28 March), where he inflicted a disastrous defeat on the Spanish army of General Gregorio García de la Cuesta. He won the Battle of Alcabon on July 26, but over the next two days was repulsed by an Anglo-Spanish army at Talavera.

After the French victory at the Battle of Ocaña, Victor entered Cordoba in November 1809 and Seville in February 1810, then laid siege to Cádiz. Lacking sufficient siege artillery, and with the city being supplied by sea, his troops could not seize the important Spanish port and the siege was abandoned after 30 months. During this period he fought at the Battle of Chiclana.

=== Russian campaign and War of the Sixth Coalition ===
In 1812, Victor was recalled to France to head the 9th Army Corps in the invasion of Russia. At the head of 30,000 men, he served in the reserve ensuring the lines of communication. At first his corps was posted in east Prussia, but it was later moved up to Smolensk to serve as the rearguard of the invading forces. From here his most important service was in protecting the retreating army at the crossing of the Berezina River. He was appointed commander of the 2nd Army Corps in March 1813, and over the following months fought at the battles of Dresden, Leipzig, Wachau, and finally at Hanau on 30 October.

During the North-eastern French campaign of 1814, Victor was one of the generals who distinguished himself alongside Napoleon. Initially stationed with his 2nd Army Corps in Strasbourg, his outnumbered troops withdrew until late January before the advancing Coalition armies. He took part in the battles of Brienne and La Rothière, and on February 17 his troops routed general Pahlen's Russian corps at the Battle of Mormant, taking 3,000 prisoners and seizing 16 artillery pieces.

On 18 February 1814, Victor arrived too late at the Battle of Montereau. The result was a scene of violent recrimination and his supersession by the emperor, who transferred his command to General Étienne Maurice Gérard. Nevertheless, he was put at the head of two divisions of the Young Guard the same day. He was wounded by a gunshot at the Battle of Craonne on 7 March, which forced him to walk on crutches for three months.

== Bourbon Restoration and later life ==
Upon Napoleon's defeat in April 1814, Victor transferred his allegiance to the restored House of Bourbon. He was made a Chevalier de Saint-Louis, and in December 1814 received from King Louis XVIII the command of the 2nd military division. In 1815, on the return of Napoleon from exile in Elba during the Hundred Days, Victor accompanied the king to Ghent.

When the second restoration followed the Battle of Waterloo, Victor returned to Paris with Louis XVIII and was made a peer of France and major-general of the Royal Guard. In October, he was appointed chairman of a commission which inquired into the conduct of the officers who joined Napoleon during the Hundred Days. As a member of the Chamber of Peers, he voted in favor of the death penalty for Marshal Michel Ney, a vote he bitterly regretted, and Victor made the day of Ney's execution (7 December) a day of penance until the end of his life.

In 1821, Victor was appointed Minister of War and held this office for two years. In this capacity, he prepared the 1823 French invasion of Spain but was dismissed by Louis Antoine, Duke of Angoulême and resumed his ministerial portfolio. After the July Revolution in 1830, he refused to swear allegiance to the government of King Louis Philippe I, was expelled from the Chamber of Peers, and retired altogether into private life. He died in Paris on 1 March 1841 and was buried at the Père-Lachaise Cemetery. His papers for the period 1793–1800 have been published (Paris, 1846).

== Personal life ==
Victor first married Jeanne-Josephine Muguet in May 1791 and had four children:

- Victorine (1792–1822)
- Charles (1795–1827)
- Napoléon-Victor (1796–1853)
- Eugène (1799–1852)

His second marriage was to Julie Vosch van Avesaet in June 1803 (1781–1831), with whom he had a daughter:

- Stephanie-Josephine (1805–1832)

== Evaluation ==
Victor had mixed military talents. He was an excellent organizer and tactician. During his time in Spain he destroyed entire Spanish armies with Cannae-like envelopments and even fought Wellington to a virtual tactical draw at Talavera. However he was a timid strategist often afraid of taking risks. Nevertheless, he recognized new developments in warfare and implemented them throughout his career. At the Beresina River in 1812, he made excellent use of reverse slope defenses showing that he learned something from Wellington.

Political offices
Preceded by Marie Victor Nicolas de Fay, marquis de La Tour-Maubourg	Minister of War; 14 December 1821 - 23 March 1823	Succeeded by Alexandre, vicomte Digeon
Preceded by Alexandre, vicomte Digeon	Minister of War; 15 April 1823 - 19 October 1823	Succeeded by Ange Hyacinthe Maxence, baron de Damas
