= Battle of Medellín =

1809 battle of the Peninsular War

- Part of the Peninsular War
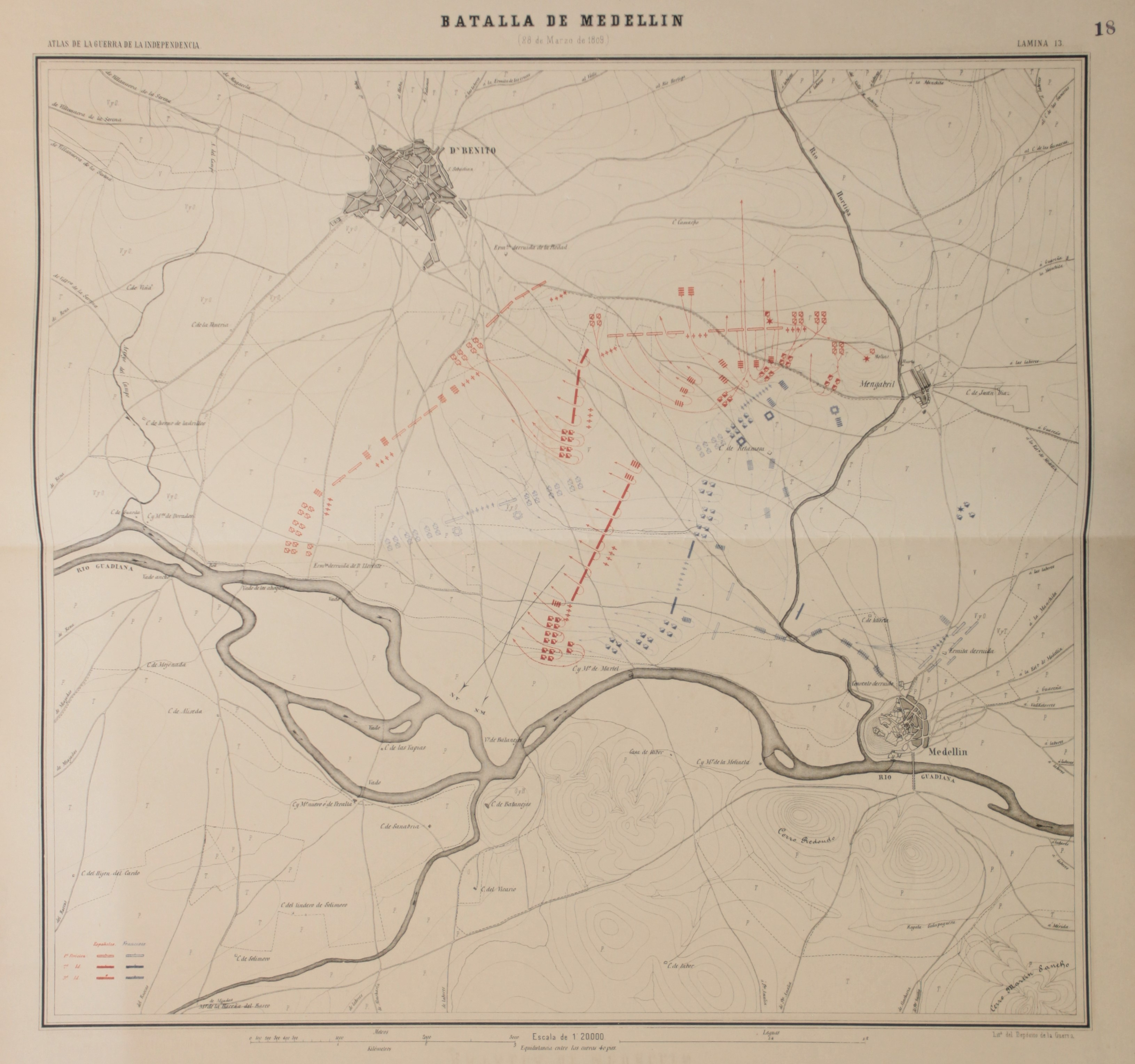
- Spanish map of the battle (1868)
Date	28 March 1809
Location	Medellín, Extremadura, Spain 38.9667°N 5.9500°W
Result	French victory

Belligerents
(France) French Empire	Spain

Commanders and leaders
(France) Claude Victor	(Spain) Gregorio de la Cuesta

Strength
13,000 infantry 4,500 cavalry 42 guns	20,000 infantry 3,000 cavalry 30 guns

Casualties and losses
1,000 dead or wounded	8,000 dead or wounded 2,000 captured 19 guns

Peninsular War: Castile & Andalusia
current battle

In the Peninsular War, the Battle of Medellín was fought on 28 March 1809 and resulted in a victory of the French under Marshal Victor against the Spanish under General Don Gregorio Garcia de la Cuesta. The battle marked the first major effort by the French to occupy Southern Spain, a feat mostly completed with the victory at the Battle of Ocaña later in the year.

== Background ==
The Spanish campaign in early 1809 started with the Battle of Uclés.

=== Prelude ===
Map of the movements of French forces in the first stage of the war

Victor began his southern drive with the objective of destroying the Army of Estremadura, commanded by General Cuesta, who was retreating in face of the French advance. On the 27th of March, Cuesta was reinforced with 7,000 troops and decided to meet the French in battle rather than continue to withdraw.

The battlefield was just southeast of the town of Medellín, roughly 300 km southwest of Madrid. The Guadiana River ran along a west-east axis in the northern edge of the battlefield, joined with the Hortiga River, which ran along a north–south axis that precluded any Spanish flanking maneuvers on the French right. Victor had roughly 17,500 troops while Cuesta possessed about 23,000. However, Victor had a 50-30 advantage in guns and could also count on more cavalry than the Spanish, 4,500 to 3,000.

Both commanders arrayed their armies in an unusual fashion, although Victor's setup seems to have been more reasonable. The center of the French army, an infantry division under General Eugene-Casimir Villatte, occupied the main road that led from Medellín to Don Benito in the southeast, whereas the wings, commanded by Lasalle (the left) and Latour-Maubourg (the right), stood much farther south and southeast. Each wing was composed of a cavalry division and two infantry battalions filled with German troops from the Confederation of the Rhine. Apparently, Victor's intentions were to keep withdrawing his flanks closer and closer to the center until a powerful counter-attack could shatter the Spanish lines. Victor's reserve was an infantry division under General François Ruffin, which would not take part in the battle. Victor's innovative scheme can be sharply contrasted with Cuesta's mistakes: Cuesta maintained no reserve and extended just 23,000 men, deployed in four ranks, into a four-mile arc from Guadiana to Hortiga. His plan was to simply strike the French wings and hope to catch the entire French army with their backs to Medellín and the Guadiana River, which was exactly what Victor expected.

== The battle ==
The cannonade began around 1 p.m. and Cuesta ordered the attack about an hour later. The Spanish initially had a great deal of success, repelling an impatient cavalry charge on their left flank by a brigade of Latour-Maoubourg's dragoons and prompting both French wings to keep falling back, all while their skirmishers unleashed deadly fire into the French ranks. Lasalle's position was a bit dangerous, since the Guadiana at his back meant his 2,000 cavalry and 2,500 infantry could not fall back more than a mile. Three Spanish cavalry regiments hovered around the bank of the Guadiana and attempted to turn the French left, but Lasalle and his men held on to their tenuous positions.

By this point in the battle, both French flanks had retreated far enough to be within easy supporting distance from Villatte's division. Latour-Maubourg's western sector was reinforced with the 94th Line infantry regiment and a battalion of grenadiers. The ten French guns in this part of the battlefield also stabilized the situation as they consistently outperformed their Spanish counterparts. Spanish infantry, however, kept pushing forward and created many problems for Latour-Maubourg's men, who were arrayed in squares to protect themselves against cavalry charges and consequently had limited firepower. As the Spanish threatened to capture the French guns, Latour-Maubourg ordered the dragoons to attack once more. This time, the charge succeeded. The French dragoons defeated three Spanish cavalry regiments, who fled the field and left their infantry isolated, prompting them to flee as well. Since Cuesta had no reserves, a breach of this magnitude was just about the worst that could happen to his fragile line.

Events now unfolded quickly. Lasalle had been reinforced with seven infantry battalions from Villatte, and once he saw the Spanish routing to the west he too ordered a powerful counter-attack. The 2nd Hussars regiment, accompanied by a regiment of Chasseurs à Cheval, smashed the Spanish cavalry, reformed, and charged at the once-again abandoned Spanish infantry in the eastern flank. Lasalle's fresh battalions also attacked frontally and French dragoons were now rolling over the center of the Spanish army, which attempted to flee in any way it could. Many were brutally killed in this chaotic retreat and Cuesta's army effectively ceased to exist.

A large part of the Spanish army, mostly on the right flank, was totally encircled, with no room to move. The French gave no quarter to Spanish soldiers, standing or surrendering, and during the rest of day they killed all of prisoners taken. Entire units were totally annihilated, Spanish bodies covering large extensions of the field.

== Results ==
It had been a disastrous day for Cuesta, who nearly lost his life in the battle. Some estimations put the number of Spanish killed at 8,000 men, counting both battle and after battle killings, and about 2,000 captured, while the French only suffered about 1,000 casualties. However, during the next days the French undertakers buried 16,002 Spanish soldiers in mass graves. On top of that, the Spanish lost 20 of their 30 guns. It was Cuesta's second major defeat at the hand of the French after Medina del Rio Seco in 1808. The battle saw the start of the French occupation of most of Southern Spain, an occupation that would end by 1812.

== Aftermath ==
The Spanish campaign in early 1809 proceeded with the liberation of Galicia in the Battle of Puente Sanpayo.

== See also ==
- Timeline of the Peninsular War

== Bibliography ==
- Bodart, Gaston (1908). Militär-historisches Kriegs-Lexikon (1618–1905).
- Napier, William (1828b). History of the war in the Peninsula and in the south of France. Vol. II. London: T. & W. Boone.

Preceded by First Battle of Porto	Napoleonic Wars; Battle of Medellín	Succeeded by Battles of Bergisel
