= List of monuments in Gudja =

This is a list of monuments in Gudja, Malta, which are listed on the National Inventory of the Cultural Property of the Maltese Islands.

== List ==
Name of object	Location	Coordinates	ID	Photo	Upload
Il-Ġnien Tal-Kmand	Triq Bir Miftuħ	35°51′04″N 14°29′58″E	01167		Upload Photo
Palazzo Dorell	Triq Ħal-Tarxien	35°51′02″N 14°30′25″E	01168	Palazzo Dorell	Upload Photo
Chapel of St. Marija ta' Bir Miftuh	Triq Santa Marija	35°51′06″N 14°29′51″E	01806	Chapel of St. Marija ta' Bir Miftuh	Upload Photo
Niche of the Madonna of Sorrows	Triq Ħal-Għaxaq / Triq Ħal-Tarxien	35°56′56″N 14°24′09″E	01807	Niche of the Madonna of Sorrows	Upload Photo
Niche of the Madonna of Graces	117-119, Triq Santa Marija	35°51′02″N 14°30′04″E	01808	Niche of the Madonna of Graces	Upload Photo
Niche of the Madonna of Lourdes	40, Triq Santa Marija	35°50′58″N 14°30′10″E	01809	Niche of the Madonna of Lourdes	Upload Photo
Chapel of the Annunciation	Triq L-Annunzjata	35°50′57″N 14°30′11″E	01810	Chapel of the Annunciation	Upload Photo
Niche of the Madonna of the Girdle	Triq L-Annunzjata / Triq Raymond Caruana	35°50′57″N 14°30′14″E	01811	Niche of the Madonna of the Girdle	Upload Photo
Niche of the Assumption	Triq il-Kbira / Triq San Ciru	35°50′53″N 14°30′10″E	01812	Niche of the Assumption	Upload Photo
Statue of St Joseph	Triq il-Kbira (near St. Mary's church)	35°50′54″N 14°30′10″E	01813	Statue of St Joseph	Upload Photo
Statue of the Assumption	Triq il-Kbira (near St. Mary's church)	35°50′52″N 14°30′09″E	01814	Statue of the Assumption	Upload Photo
Cross	Triq il-Kbira / Triq Ġilormu Cassar	35°50′51″N 14°30′08″E	01815	Cross	Upload Photo
Niche of the Madonna of the Rosary	Triq Ġilormu Cassar / Triq il-Kbira	35°50′50″N 14°30′08″E	01816	Niche of the Madonna of the Rosary	Upload Photo
Empty Niche (Madonna of Rosary)	40, Triq San Mark	35°50′51″N 14°30′06″E	01817	Empty Niche (Madonna of Rosary)	Upload Photo
Niche of the Holy Family	34, Triq San Mark	35°50′52″N 14°30′06″E	01818	Niche of the Holy Family	Upload Photo
Niche of St. Anthony	28, Triq San Mark	35°50′52″N 14°30′06″E	01819	Niche of St. Anthony	Upload Photo
Niche of the Assumption	Triq iż-Żebbuġa	35°50′53″N 14°30′08″E	01820	Niche of the Assumption	Upload Photo
Niche of St Paul (statue removed)	Triq id-Dejqa / Triq Santa Katerina	35°50′53″N 14°30′12″E	01821	Niche of St Paul (statue removed)	Upload Photo
Niche of the Immaculate Conception	30, Triq San Ciru	35°50′53″N 14°30′12″E	01822	Niche of the Immaculate Conception	Upload Photo
Niche of St Joseph	Triq San Ciru / Triq Santa Katerina	35°50′52″N 14°30′12″E	01823	Niche of St Joseph	Upload Photo
Statue of the Assumption	11, Triq Santa Katerina	35°50′56″N 14°30′14″E	01824	Statue of the Assumption	Upload Photo
Chapel of St. Catherine	61, Triq Raymond Caruana	35°50′56″N 14°30′14″E	01825	Chapel of St. Catherine	Upload Photo
Niche of the Madonna of Mount Carmel	35-37, Triq Raymond Caruana	35°50′59″N 14°30′18″E	01826	Niche of the Madonna of Mount Carmel	Upload Photo
Niche of Christ the King	"Kristu Re", 104, Triq Raymond Caruana	35°50′56″N 14°30′12″E	01827	Niche of Christ the King	Upload Photo
Niche of the Madonna of Light	115, Triq il-Kbira	35°50′46″N 14°30′07″E	01828	Niche of the Madonna of Light	Upload Photo
Niche of St Joseph	Triq il-Magħsar / Triq San Pawl	35°50′54″N 14°30′02″E	01829	Niche of St Joseph	Upload Photo
Niche of the Madonna of Loreto	Triq ta' Loreto	35°50′36″N 14°30′08″E	01830	Niche of the Madonna of Loreto	Upload Photo
Chapel of the Madonna of Loreto	Triq ta' Loreto / Triq Ħal Far	35°50′30″N 14°30′02″E	01831	Chapel of the Madonna of Loreto	Upload Photo
Statue of the Immaculate Conception	On a farm near Loreto Chapel (approximate location)	35°50′35″N 14°30′12″E	01832	Statue of the Immaculate Conception	Upload Photo
Statue of St. Paul	On a farm near Loreto Chapel (approximate location)	35°50′35″N 14°30′12″E	01833	Statue of St. Paul	Upload Photo
Statue of St. Paul	Vjal l-Avjazzjoni (opposite the airport staff carpark)	35°50′50″N 14°29′56″E	01834	Statue of St. Paul	Upload Photo
Parish Church of the Assumption	Triq il-Kbira	35°50′54″N 14°30′08″E	01835	Parish Church of the Assumption	Upload Photo
