= Thomas Graham, 1st Baron Lynedoch =

British Army officer and politician (1748–1843)

General The Right Honourable The Lord Lynedoch GCB GCMG
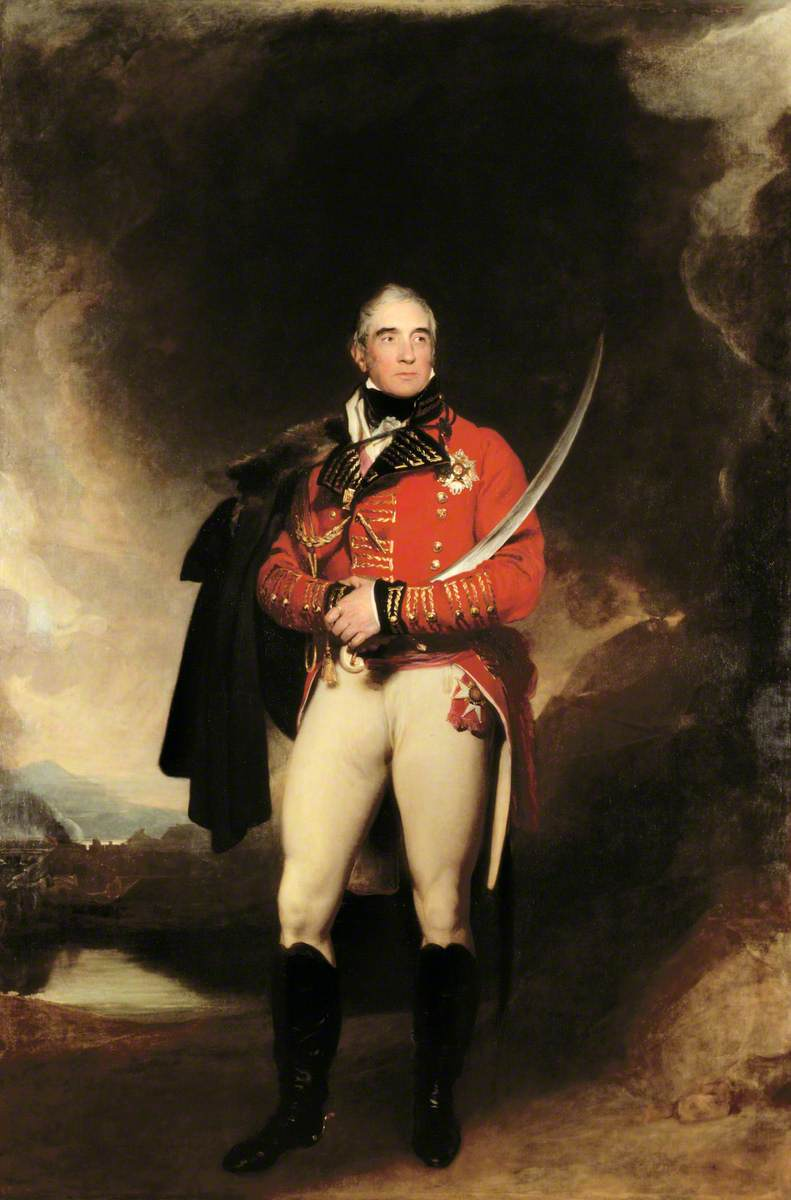
- Portrait of Thomas Graham by Sir Thomas Lawrence, 1817

Member of Parliament for Perthshire
- In office 1794–1807
- Preceded by: James Murray
- Succeeded by: Lord James Murray
- Majority: Unanimous

Personal details
- Born: 19 October 1748 Balgowan House, Perthshire, Scotland, Kingdom of Great Britain
- Died: 18 December 1843 (aged 95) London, England, United Kingdom of Great Britain & Ireland
- Party: Whig
- Spouse: Mary Cathcart
- Education: Christ Church, Oxford
- Occupation: Member of Parliament, Soldier

Military service
- Allegiance: Great Britain; United Kingdom
- Branch/service: British Army
- Years of service: 1793–1814
- Rank: General
- Battles/wars: French Revolutionary Wars; Siege of Toulon; Siege of Mantua (1796–1797); Napoleonic Wars; Peninsular War; Battle of Barrosa; Siege of Ciudad Rodrigo (1812); Battle of Vitoria; Siege of San Sebastián; Battle of Tolosa (1813); Battle of Hoogstraten; Siege of Bergen op Zoom (1814)

General Thomas Graham, 1st Baron Lynedoch, GCB, GCMG (19 October 1748 – 18 December 1843) was a British Army officer and politician. After his education at Oxford, he inherited a substantial estate in Scotland, married and settled down to a quiet career as a landowning gentleman. However, with the death of his wife, when he was aged 42, he immersed himself in military (and later political) career, during the French Revolutionary Wars and the Napoleonic Wars. The historian James Taylor described Graham as "tall, square-shouldered, and erect, his limbs sinewy and remarkably strong. His complexion was dark, with full eyebrows, firm-set lips, and an open, benevolent air. His manners and address were frank, simple, and polished".

== Early life and education ==
Thomas Graham was the third and only surviving son of Thomas Græme of Balgowan, in Perthshire and Lady Christian Hope, a daughter of the 1st Earl of Hopetoun and sister to the 2nd Earl of Hopetoun. He was born in 1748, and was educated at home by the Reverend Fraser, minister of Moneydie, and afterwards by James Macpherson, the collector and translator of Ossian's poems. He went up to Christ Church, Oxford, in 1766, and the following year he inherited the family estate following the death of his father.

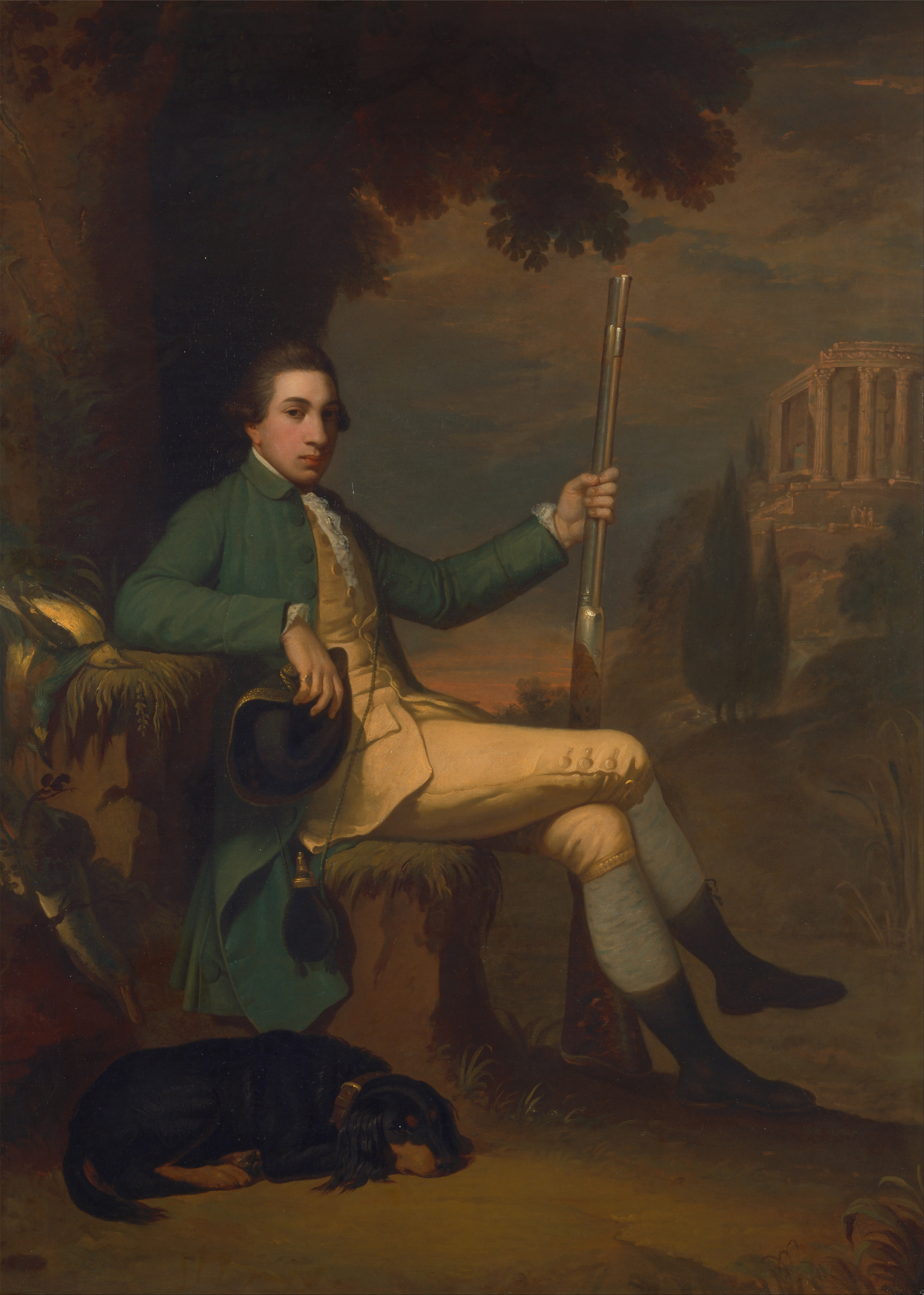
Portrait by David Allan, 1769

On leaving college, he spent several years on the Continent, where he learnt French, German and Spanish. On his return to Scotland he applied himself to the management and improvement of his estate, enclosing his lands, erecting farmhouses and offices, granting leases to his tenants, encouraging them to implement improved methods of husbandry, and to cultivate potatoes and turnips on a large scale, which had hitherto been regarded as garden plants. He also set himself to cultivate improved breeds of horses, cattle, and sheep.

In 1785, he purchased the estate of Lynedoch or Lednock, situated in the valley of the Almond, where he planted trees and oak coppices, and improved the sloping banks bordering the stream. Fond of horses and dogs, and distinguished for his skill in country sports, he rode with the foxhounds, and accompanied the Duke of Atholl—who subsequently became his brother-in-law—in grouse-shooting and deer-stalking on the Atholl moors. He later said that he owed much of that education of the eye with reference to ground and distances, a useful talent for a military man, to his deer-hunting at this period of his life in the Forest of Atholl.

== Marriage ==
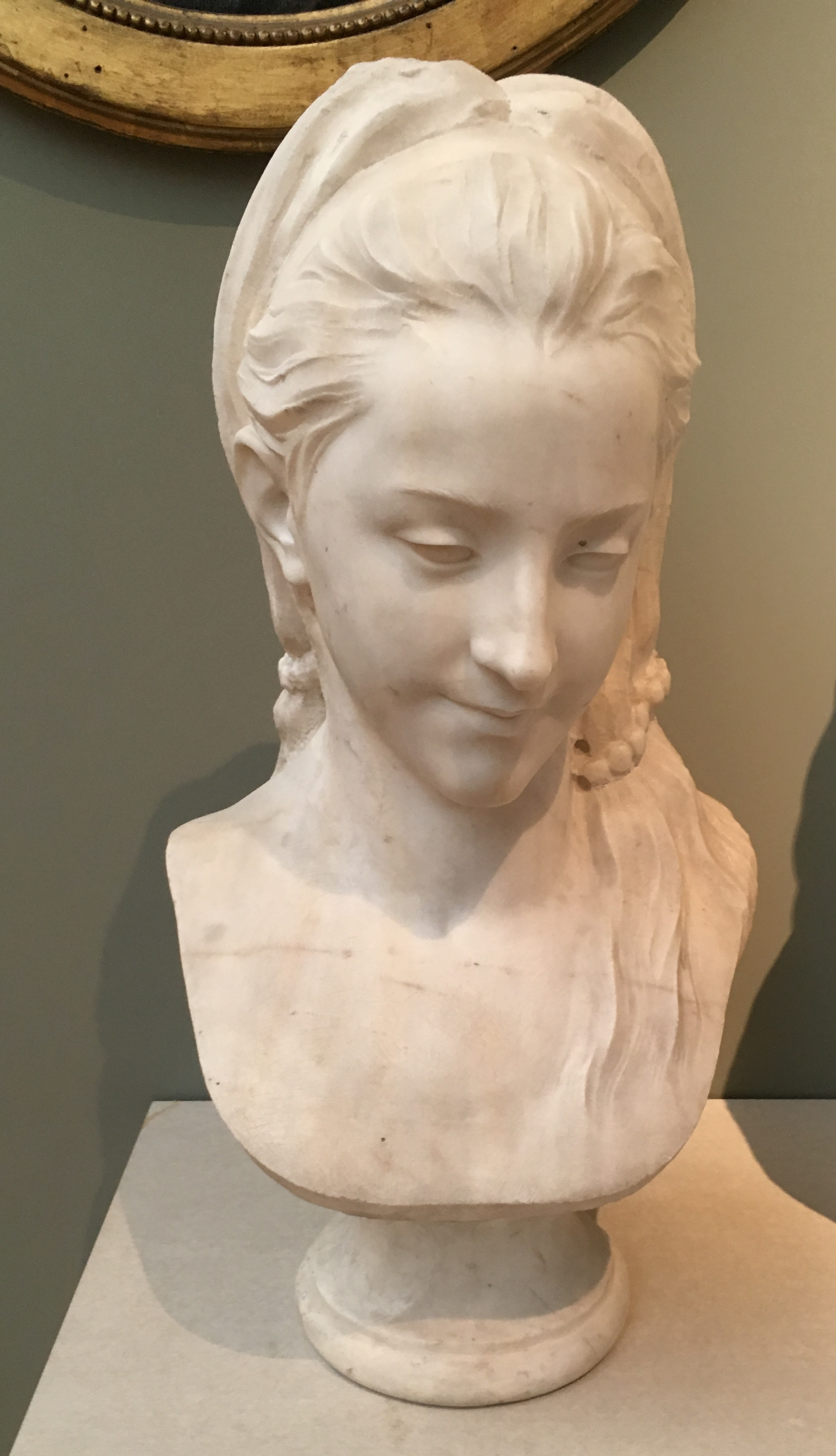
Bust of his wife, Mary.

In a 1772 by-election, Graham stood as a Whig a candidate for Perth, in opposition to James Murray of Strowan, brother of the Duke of Atholl, but was defeated by a majority of only six votes out of 100. He remained active in the political field but withdrew shortly before the general election of 1774, having become engaged to the Honorable Mary Cathcart, second daughter of the 9th Lord Cathcart and Jane Hamilton, Mary's sister was betrothed to the 3rd Duke of Atholl's son and heir.

In 1774, Graham married Mary Cathcart and on the same day her elder sister Jane became Duchess of Atholl. "Jane," wrote 9th Lord Cathcart, "has married, to please herself, John, Duke of Atholl, a peer of the realm; Mary has married Thomas Graham of Balgowan, the man of her heart, and a peer among princes." A solicitous husband, when his wife discovered on the morning of an Edinburgh ball that she had left her jewel-box at Balgowan, Graham rode the 90 miles (140 km) to and from Balgowan using relays of horses to ensure that his wife would have her jewellery at the ball.

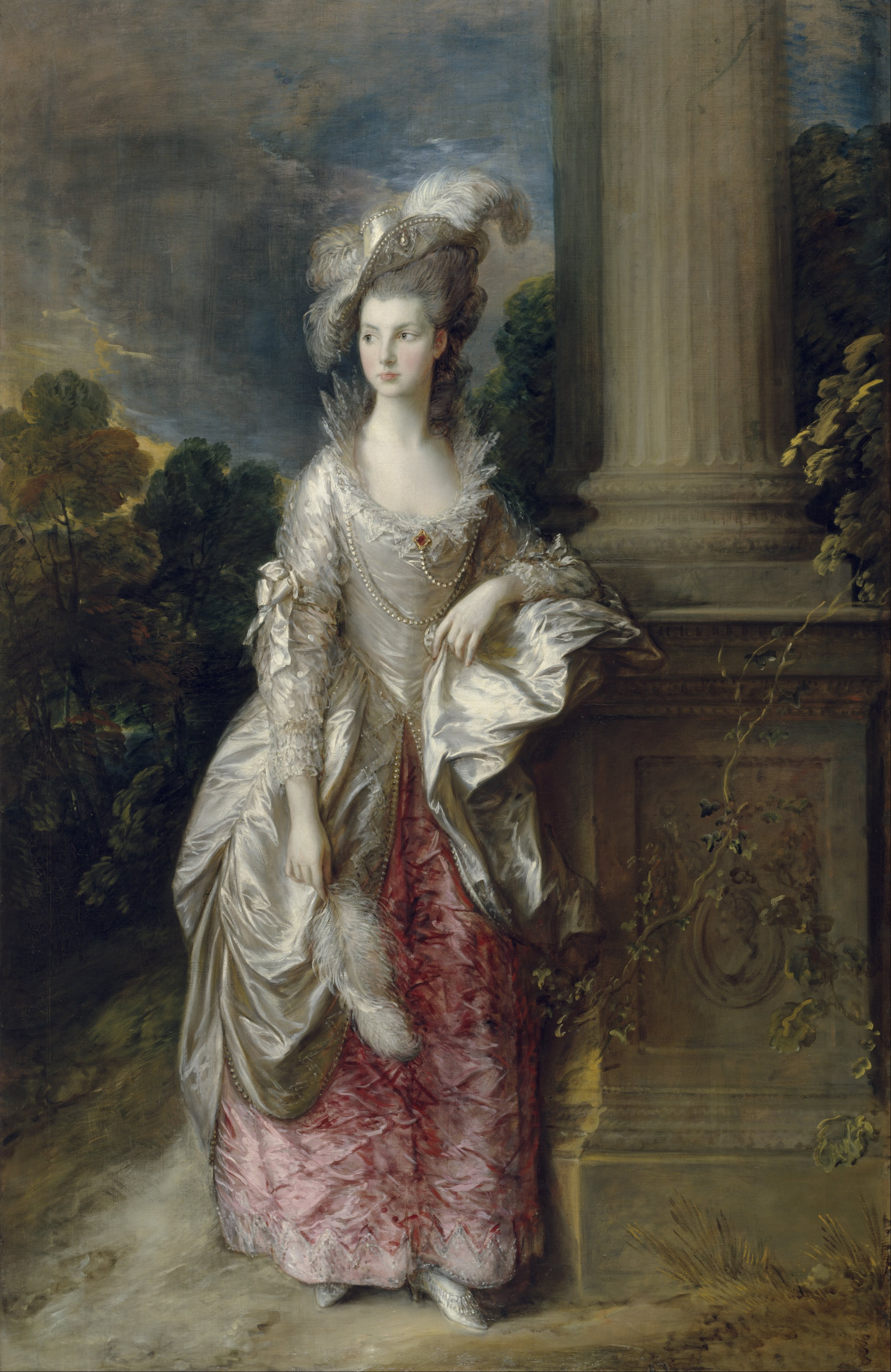
The famous portrait of the beautiful Mrs. Graham wearing Jacobean inspired costume by Thomas Gainsborough, 1777.

Her portrait by Thomas Gainsborough was highly acclaimed when exhibited at the Royal Academy in 1777. The painting Portrait of Mrs Mary Graham was covered over by Graham after her death. The painting now hangs in the National Galleries of Scotland, Edinburgh.

Graham spent the next eighteen years as a quiet country gentleman, spending his time on riding and sports, studying the classics and making occasional visits to London and Edinburgh. When he was driving to a party with his wife and her sister Duchess of Atholl, his carriage was stopped in Park Lane, London by a highwayman demanding money, jewels, and watches at gunpoint, while two accomplices seized the horses' heads, Graham, who was on the opposite side of the carriage, leapt across the ladies to the carriage-door, and collaring the assailant, threw him to the ground. Then, drawing his sword, which at the time formed part of a dress suit, he threatened to run the man through if his associates, who were holding the horses' heads, attempted to come to his assistance. They immediately fled, and the prostrate highwayman was arrested.

== Death of his wife ==
Mrs. Graham ( Mary Cathcart) by Thomas Gainsborough

Mary Graham's health began to decline, and in the spring of 1792, on the recommendation of her medical adviser, she went to the south of France with her husband and sister. However, during the voyage she died off the coast near Hyères, in the south of France, on 26 June 1792. Her grieving husband hired a barge to take the casket ashore. However, on his way to Bordeaux French Revolutionary militia desecrated the casket and the body of his wife looking for contraband and valuables. Eventually Graham returned to Scotland where he interred her remains in a mausoleum he had specially built in the churchyard at Methven, Perth and Kinross. Graham would be laid to rest in the same tomb fifty years later.

Mary Graham is commemorated in a four-part Scottish fiddle tune composed in her honor, entitled "The Honourable Mrs. Graham of Balgowan."

The loss of his wife preyed deeply upon Graham's mind, and first he set out for twelve months of foreign travel. However, still overwhelmed by great sorrow, and now in his forty-third year, he tried to drown the thought of his loss by adopting a military career. Before the incident with Mary's coffin near Toulouse, Graham had sympathised with the French and their revolutionary ideals but from that point on he detested them and saw his military career as a way to take revenge.

Sir Walter Scott, in his The Vision of Don Roderick, refers to the romantic motive which led the grieving husband of Mrs. Graham to devote himself to a military career:

'Nor be his praise o'erpast who strove to hide
Beneath the warrior's vest affection's wound;
Whose wish Heaven for his country's weal denied;
Danger and fate he sought, but glory found.
From clime to clime, where'er war's trumpets sound
The wanderer went; yet Caledonia! still
Thine was his thought in march and tented ground:
He dreamed 'mid Alpine cliffs of Athole's hill,
And heard in Ebro's roar his Lynedoch's lovely rill.

== Career ==
=== Defence of Toulon ===
In early 1793 he wrote to Charles O'Hara, seeking passage to Gibraltar, of which the latter was lieutenant-governor and sailed aboard the Resistance with Lord St Helens, ambassador to Spain. After France declared war on Great Britain and the Dutch Republic on 1 February 1793, the British fleet under Admiral Samuel Hood assembled at Gibraltar. On his arrival there, Graham volunteered and went with the navy to Toulon, where he acted as aide-de-camp to Lord Mulgrave and fought in the defence of the town. According to Sir Gilbert Elliot, Graham "left the highest character possible both for understanding and courage".

At Toulon, Graham distinguished himself by his courage and energy: for instance, on one occasion, when a private soldier was killed, Graham snatched up his musket and took his place at the head of the attacking column. In a general order referring to the repulse of an attack by the French on an important fort, Mulgrave expressed "his grateful sense of the friendly and important assistance which he had received in many difficult moments from Mr. Graham, and to add his tribute of praise to the general voice of the British and Piedmontese officers of his column, who saw with so much pleasure and applause the gallant example which Mr. Graham set to the whole column, in the foremost point of every attack".

It was also at Toulon that Graham first became acquainted with his lifelong friend, Rowland Hill, then a captain, who ultimately became Viscount Hill, and commander-in chief of the British army.

=== Campaign of 1796 and return to Parliament ===
After returning home in November 1793, with the support of Henry Dundas, Secretary of State for War, who had married his first cousin the previous year, he was given the temporary rank of lieutenant-colonel and raised the first battalion of the 90th Regiment of Foot (Perthshire Volunteers), (Balgowan's 'Grey Breeks,' as they were called), although the addition of a second battalion was to put significant pressure on his finances. Rowland Hill became a major in the regiment, which was first deployed as part of the 1795 Quiberon Expedition. The following year they were dispatched to support the French Royalist Lieutenant-general François de Charette in his struggle with the Republicans.

In late 1795 the regiment went to Gibraltar on garrison duty, a role Graham soon tired of. He obtained permission to join the Austrian army on the Rhine as British Commissioner. In this capacity he shared in the disastrous campaign of 1796, and afterward assisted Wurmser in the defence of Mantua, when it was besieged by the French under Napoleon. The garrison was reduced to the greatest extremities from want of provisions, and Graham undertook the perilous duty of conveying intelligence to the Imperial General Alvinzi, at Bassano, 50 miles (80 km) distant, of their desperate situation.

He left the fortress wearing a country cloak over his uniform and on 24 December, amid rain and sleet, he crossed the Mincio in a boat that was repeatedly stranded due to the darkness. He travelled by foot during the night, wading through deep swamps, and crossing numerous watercourses and the Po, in constant danger of losing his way, or of being shot by the French pickets. At daybreak he concealed himself until nightfall, when he resumed his journey. After surmounting numerous hardships and perils, he at length reached in safety, on 4 January, the headquarters of the Austrian general. However, on the 14th the Austrians were defeated and soon after Mantua was forced to surrender.

On the political front, with the support of the Duke of Atholl, in 1796 he was returned to parliament unchallenged, despite Dundas' wishing to secure the seat for his own son. Graham insisted that Atholl's support had no effect on his independence and he later wrote that at the time he remained firmly in support of the war but "at the same time never to abandon those Whig principles which had brought about the revolution of 1688."

=== 1797–1800 ===
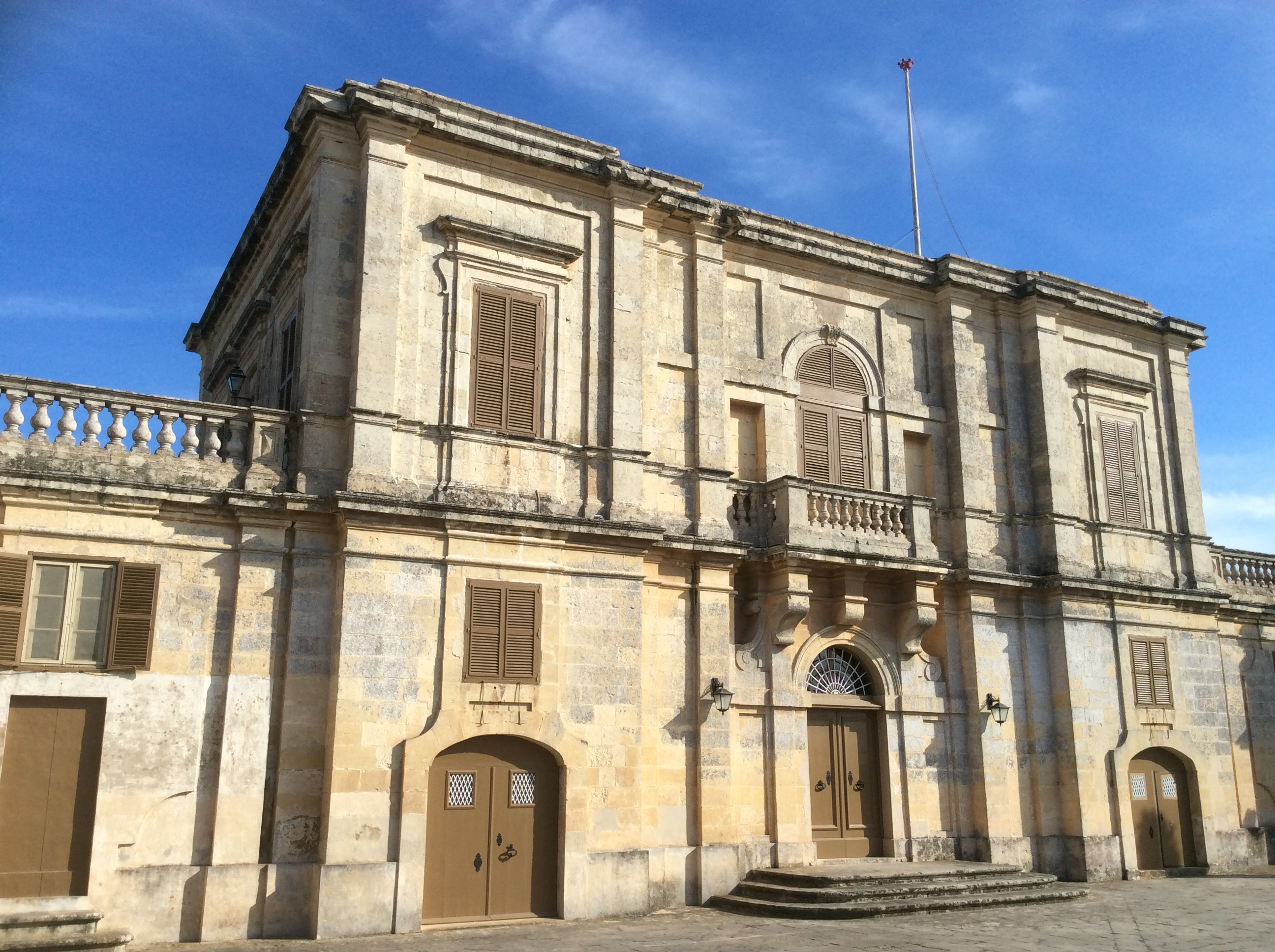
Palazzo Dorell in Gudja, Malta, which was Graham's headquarters during the blockade of 1798–1800

Colonel Graham now returned to Scotland, but in the autumn of 1797 he rejoined his regiment at Gibraltar. In the following year he took part, under Sir Charles Stuart, in the capture of Minorca, where he greatly distinguished himself.

He then travelled to Sicily and, at an audience with the King and Queen of Naples, he received royal thanks for his effective actions on their behalf. In 1798 he was appointed to take charge of the operations against the important island of Malta, which was at that time occupied by the French. Promoted to the local rank of brigadier-general, he had under his command the 30th and 89th Regiments of foot, Alexander Hamilton as his Brigade Major and some corps embodied under his immediate direction.

Owing to the great strength of the island, he chose to enforce a blockade, and after a siege lasting nearly two years, the garrison were compelled by famine to surrender in September 1800. The island became part of the British Empire, a position it retained until it achieved independence in 1964. Colonel Graham's services were barely acknowledged by the Government of that day, who reserved their patronage and honours for the officers belonging to their own political party.

=== 1801–1807 ===
In the summer of 1801 he travelled to Egypt, where his regiment, the 90th, had already distinguished itself under Sir Ralph Abercromby, but he did not arrive until the campaign had been completed by the capitulation of the French army. He took the opportunity, however, to make a tour of Egypt and subsequently also visited Turkey. He spent some time in Constantinople and then travelled on horseback to Vienna. He would later recall the journey as one of the most agreeable rides he had ever enjoyed.

Returning to spending some time in the discharge of his parliamentary duties, and in attending to the improvement of his estates, Graham was sent to Ireland with his regiment, after which he was deployed to the West Indies, where he remained for three years. In 1807, the government known as the Ministry of "All the Talents" was dismissed for their desire to provide Roman Catholics in the country with equal privileges to other citizens. Graham was supportive of the policy, and publicly denounced the cry of "No Popery" raised by Mr. Perceval as hypocrisy. However, his support for the attitude of the Whig Ministry for Roman Catholic emancipation was not in line with the electors of Perthshire, at the time a small body of men, and on the dissolution of Parliament in May 1807, he declined to seek re-election. In his stead, Lord James Murray was returned without opposition.

=== 1808 ===
In 1808, Graham served as aide-de-camp to Sir John Moore, initially in Sweden, and then in Spain. He served with Moore throughout the whole of the campaign up to the retreat after the Corunna. Graham was particularly commended for his services in the retreat. As Sheridan said in the House of Commons, "In the hour of peril Graham was their best adviser; in the hour of disaster Graham was their surest consolation".

When Sir John Moore received his fatal wound at the battle of Corunna, Graham was at his right hand, with his left hand on the mane of Sir John's horse. Immediately, he rode away to get medical assistance. Before he had returned, Moore noted his absence, and anxiously asked, "Are Colonel Graham and my aides-de-camp safe?". This was some of his last words. On his death, Moore's body was taken to Graham's quarters, and Graham was one of the chosen company that were witness to Moore's burial on the rampart of the citadel of Corunna.

=== 1809–11 ===
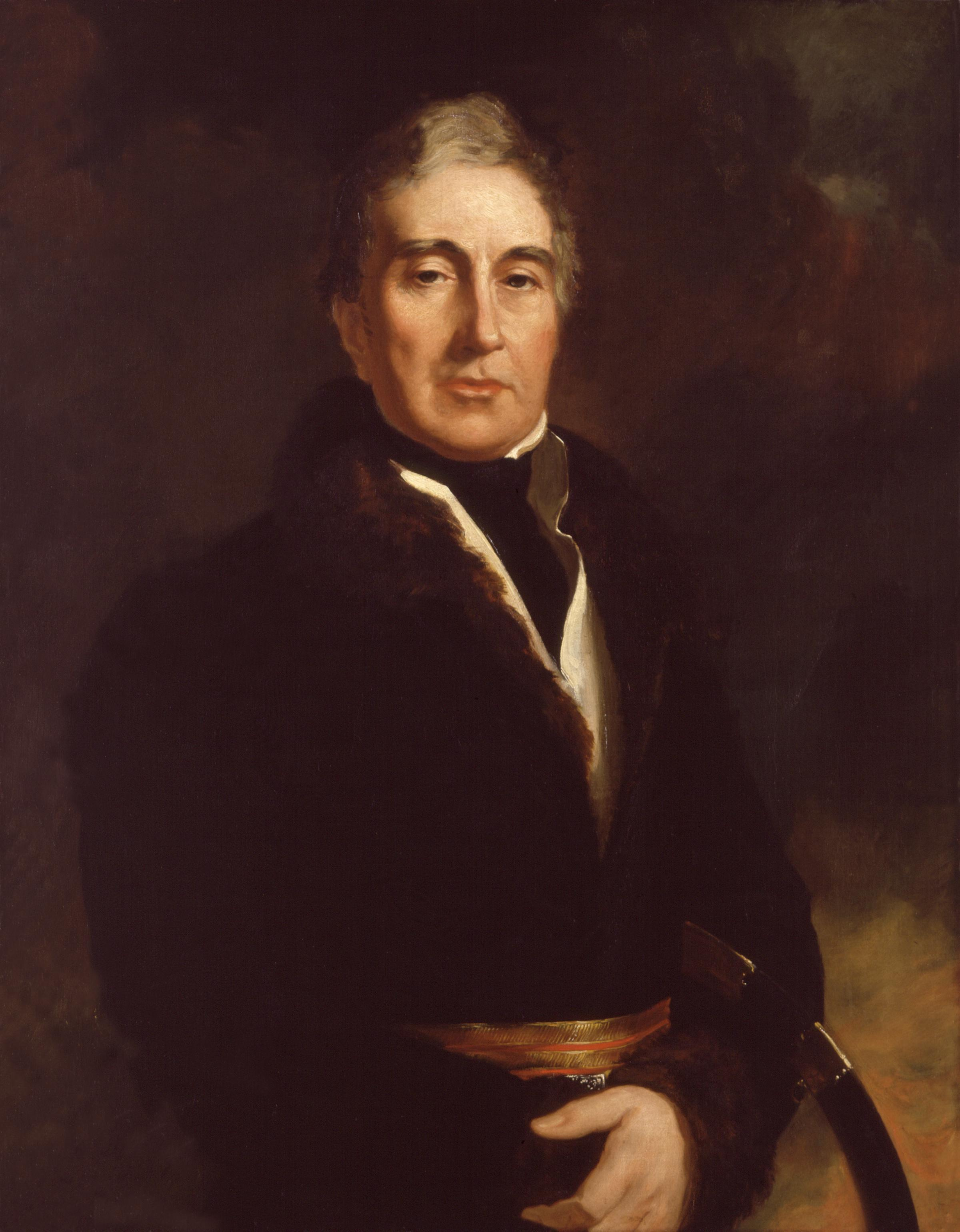
Portrait of Baron Lynedoch 1823 by Sir George Hayter

On his return to England, Graham was promoted to the rank of major general and was appointed, in the summer of 1809, to command a division under Lord Chatham. He was sent to join Chatham as part of an attack on Walcheren but a bout of malaria forced him to return home. Raised to the rank of lieutenant general on his recovery, he was sent to Spain with a new commission, to take command of the British and Portuguese troops in Cádiz, at that time surrounded by a large French force. The British Government attached great importance to the possession of Cádiz, as it was Britain's last stronghold in the Iberian Peninsula. However, the challenge was not simply a military one. As William Napier remarked, while "money, troops, and a fleet—in fine, all things necessary to render Cádiz formidable, were collected, yet to little purpose, because procrastinating jealousy, ostentation, and a thousand absurdities, were the invariable attendants of Spanish armies and government".

To raise the siege, Graham decided to launch an attack on the rear of the investing army, and in February 1811, he sailed from Cádiz with a force of approximately 11,000 soldiers, including 7,000 Spanish troops under General La Pena. For the sake of expediency, Le Pena was named in command. After assembling at Tarifa, in the Straits of Gibraltar, the allied force marched northward and arrived, on the morning of 5 March, at the hills of Barrosa, which lie to the south of Cádiz and so were south of the lines of the French forces.

On the instructions of the Spanish general to secure the communication across the Santi Petri river, Graham moved his troops down from the heights of Barossa to the Torre de Bermeja, which lay halfway to the river. While marching through the wood towards the Bermeja, Graham was told that the enemy was advancing in force towards the height of Barrosa, which launched the Battle of Barrosa. Seeing that the higher position was the key of that of Santi Petri, Graham immediately countermarched with the aim to support the troops left for its defence. However, before the British force could emerge from the wood, he was shocked to see the Spanish troops under La Pena retreating from the French left wing, which was rapidly advancing up the hill.

Seeing that his own right wing was vulnerable to enemy fire, Graham said, "A retreat in the face of such an enemy, already within reach of the easy communication by the sea-beach, must have involved the whole allied army in all the danger of being attacked during the unavoidable confusion of the different corps arriving on the narrow ridge of the Bermeja at the same time. Trusting to the known heroism of British troops, regardless of the numbers and position of the enemy", Graham instead decided to launch an immediate attack.

Under bombardment by Major Duncan's battery of ten guns, a division of the French troops under General Leval advanced on Graham's forces. It was stopped by a determined charge of the British left wing and the eagle of the 8th regiment of light infantry was captured by the British along with a howitzer. A reserve was formed up beyond the narrow valley which pursued the retreating French soldiers so that they were also defeated. At the same time, the British right wing confronted a division commanded by General Ruffin. Confident of success, the French troops advanced up the hill but were driven from the heights in disarray, leaving two pieces of cannon behind to be captured by the British.

"No expressions of mine", said Graham, in his despatch to the Secretary of State for War and the Colonies, the Earl of Liverpool, "could do justice to the conduct of the troops throughout. Nothing less than the almost unparalleled exertions of every officer, the invincible bravery of every soldier, and the most determined devotion to the honour of his Majesty's arms in all, could have achieved this brilliant success against such a formidable enemy so posted". "The contemptible feebleness of La Pena", according to William Napier, "furnished a surprising contrast to the heroic vigour of Graham, whose attack was an inspiration rather than a resolution—so sure, so sudden was the decision, so swift, so conclusive was the execution".

The French lost about three thousand men in this action, and six pieces of cannon and an eagle were captured, along with nearly five hundred prisoners, among whom were Generals Ruffin and Rosseau. The loss on the side of the victors was two hundred killed, and upwards of nine hundred were wounded. Had it not been for the actions of the Spanish general, the victory might have had the effect of raising the blockade of Cádiz. "Had the whole body of the Spanish cavalry", wrote Graham, "with the horse artillery, been rapidly sent by the sea-beach to form on the plain, and to envelop the enemy's left; had the greatest part of the infantry been marched through the pine wood to the rear of the British force, to turn his right, he must either have retired instantly, or he would have exposed himself to absolute destruction; his cavalry greatly encumbered, his artillery lost, his columns mixed and in confusion; and a general dispersion would have been the inevitable consequence of a close pursuit. But the movement was lost".

Lord Wellington, in a dispatch to General Graham, says "I beg to congratulate you and the brave troops under your command on the signal victory which you gained on the 5th instant. I have no doubt whatever that their success would have had the effect of raising the siege of Cádiz, if the Spanish troops had made any effort to assist them; and I am equally certain, from your account of the ground, that if you had not decided with the utmost promptitude to attack the enemy, and if your attack had not been a most vigorous one, the whole allied army would have been lost".

The Spanish general, in order to screen himself from criticism, circulated less damning accounts of his own role in the battle, which General Graham refuted by publishing in Spanish, as well as in English, his dispatch to Lord Liverpool, along with a letter to the British envoy, in vindication of his conduct. Lord Wellington mentions that La Pena was to be brought to a court-martial, where he was acquitted but stripped of command. The Cortes voted to General Graham the title of grandee of the first class; he, however, declined the honour. For his brilliant victory at the Battle of Barrosa he received the thanks of Parliament, in his place as a member of the House of Commons.

=== 1812 ===
Shortly afterwards Graham joined the army under Wellington, and was appointed second in command. In January 1812, he took part in the siege and capture of Ciudad Rodrigo, and Wellington declared that he was much indebted to him for the success of the enterprise. Three months later he and his friend General Hill received the Order of the Bath. A problem with his eyes, from which he had been suffering for some time, made it necessary for Graham to return home at this juncture. "I cannot avoid feeling the utmost concern," wrote Wellington to him, "that this necessity should have become urgent at this moment, and that I should now be deprived of your valuable assistance".

At the general election in October 1812, Graham contested the county of Perth with Mr. Drummond (afterwards Viscount of Strathallan), but though he was supported by a number of influential Tories, he lost the election by seven votes.

=== 1813 ===
His visit to Scotland had the effect of restoring his eyesight, and in May 1813, he rejoined the army at Frinada, on the frontiers of Portugal, bringing with him the insignia of the Order of the Garter to Lord Wellington. On 22 May the British force quit Portugal and moved upon Vitoria in three divisions. The left wing, which was commanded by Sir Thomas Graham, had to cross three large rivers—the Douro, the Esla, and the Ebro—and had to force positions of great strength among the passes of the mountains, continually pressing round the right wing of the retiring French army. General Graham took a prominent part in the battle of Vitoria (21 June), when the French were beaten "before the town, in the town, about the town, and out of the town"; and, by carrying the villages of Gamarra and Abechuco at the point of the bayonet, he intercepted the retreat of the enemy by the high road to Bayonne, and compelled them to turn to that leading to Pampeluna.

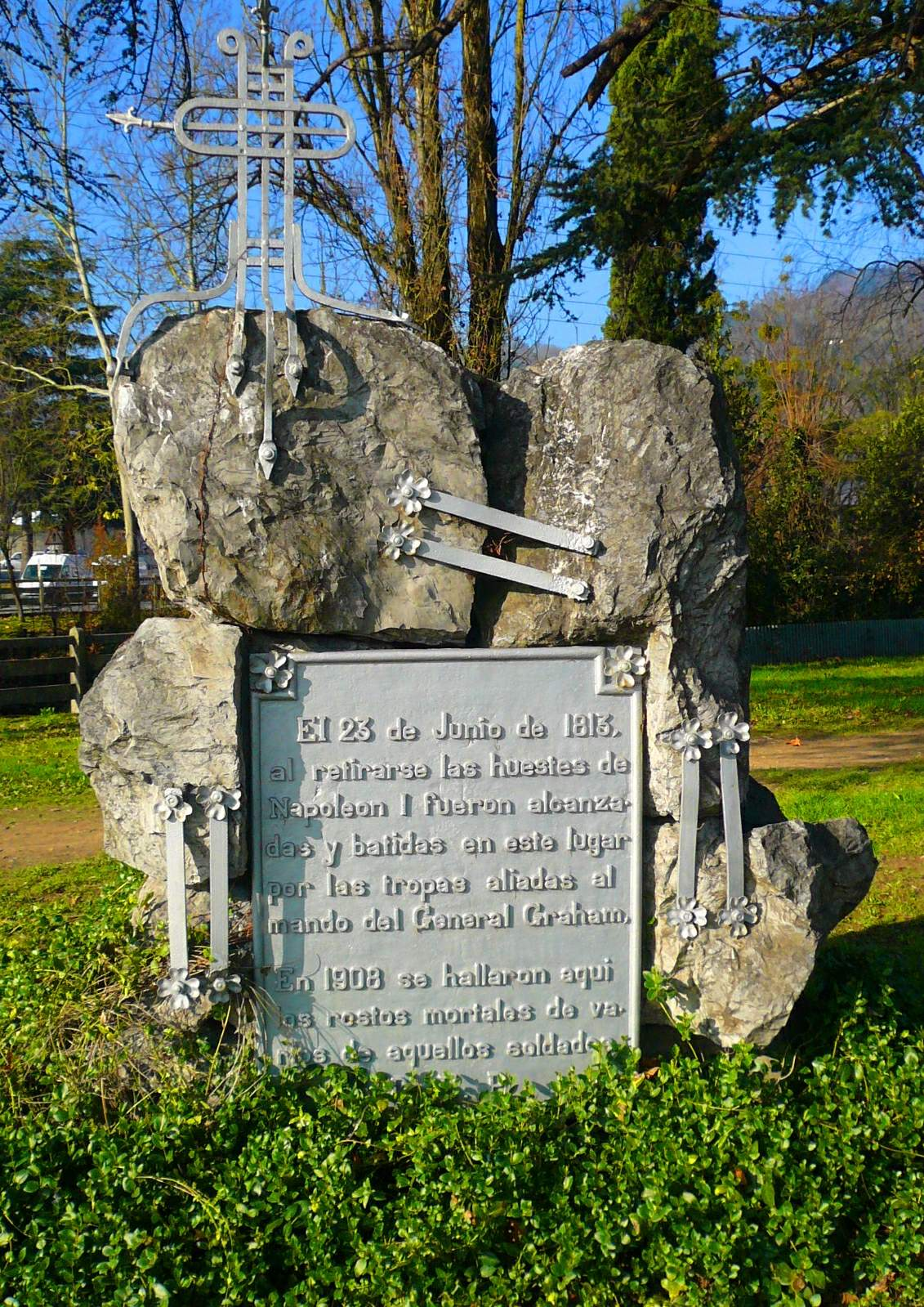
Memorial to the French soldiers surprised and killed by Graham in Beasain, Gipuzkoa, on 23 June 1813

He was shortly after directed to conduct the siege of San Sebastián, which was defended with great gallantry and skill by General Louis Emmanuel Rey. The first assault, which took place on 25 July, was repulsed with heavy loss, and the siege had in consequence to be raised for a time. It was renewed, however, after the defeat of Marshal Soult in the Battles of the Pyrenees, and a second attempt to capture the town was made on 31 August. The breach was found to present almost insuperable obstacles, and the storming party strove in vain to effect a lodgement. In this almost desperate state of the attack, Graham ordered a heavy fire of artillery to be directed against the curtain wall, passing only a few feet over the heads of the British troops in the breach. This novel expedient was completely successful, and taking advantage of an explosion on the rampart caused by the fire of the guns, which created confusion among the French, the attackers gained a footing on the wall, and after a bloody struggle, which lasted two hours, forced their way into the town. Following their capture of San Sebastián, many of the attacking rank-and-file broke ranks and went on a rampage, committing numerous acts of rape and pillage along with killing approximately 1,000 civilians and burning much of the town.

On 31 August the French troops were forced to retreat from the town to their stronghold on the hill and fortress Urgull. On 9 September the Governor Rey surrendered the citadel, and the garrison, reduced to one-third of their number, marched out with the honours of war. The reduction of this important place cost the attackers 3,800 killed and wounded. At the crossing of the Bidasoa separating France and Spain, Graham commanded the left wing of the British army, and, after an obstinate conflict, succeeded in establishing his troops on French territory. However, the return of the complaint in his eyes, and the general state of his health, obliged him to resign his command and return home. In return for his services, for the third received the thanks of Parliament, and the freedom of the cities of London and Edinburgh was conferred upon him.

=== 1814 ===
His eyes and general health recovered and in 1814 he was able to take the command of the British forces in the Netherlands, during which period he successfully supported Bülow's attack on Hoogstraten. On 8 March Graham's attempt to carry the strong fortress of Bergen op Zoom by a night attack ended in failure. In his dispatch to Downing Street he wrote:

"My Lord, It becomes my painful task to report to your Lordship, that an attack on Bergen-op Zoom, which seemed at first to promise complete success, ended in failure, and occasioned a severe loss to the 1st Division, and to Brigadier-General Gore's brigade. It is unnecessary for me to state the reasons which determined me to make the attempt to carry such a place by storm, since the success of two of the columns, in establishing themselves on the ramparts, with very trifling loss, must justify the having inclined the risk for the attainment of so important an object, as the capture of such a fortress."

== Later life and death ==
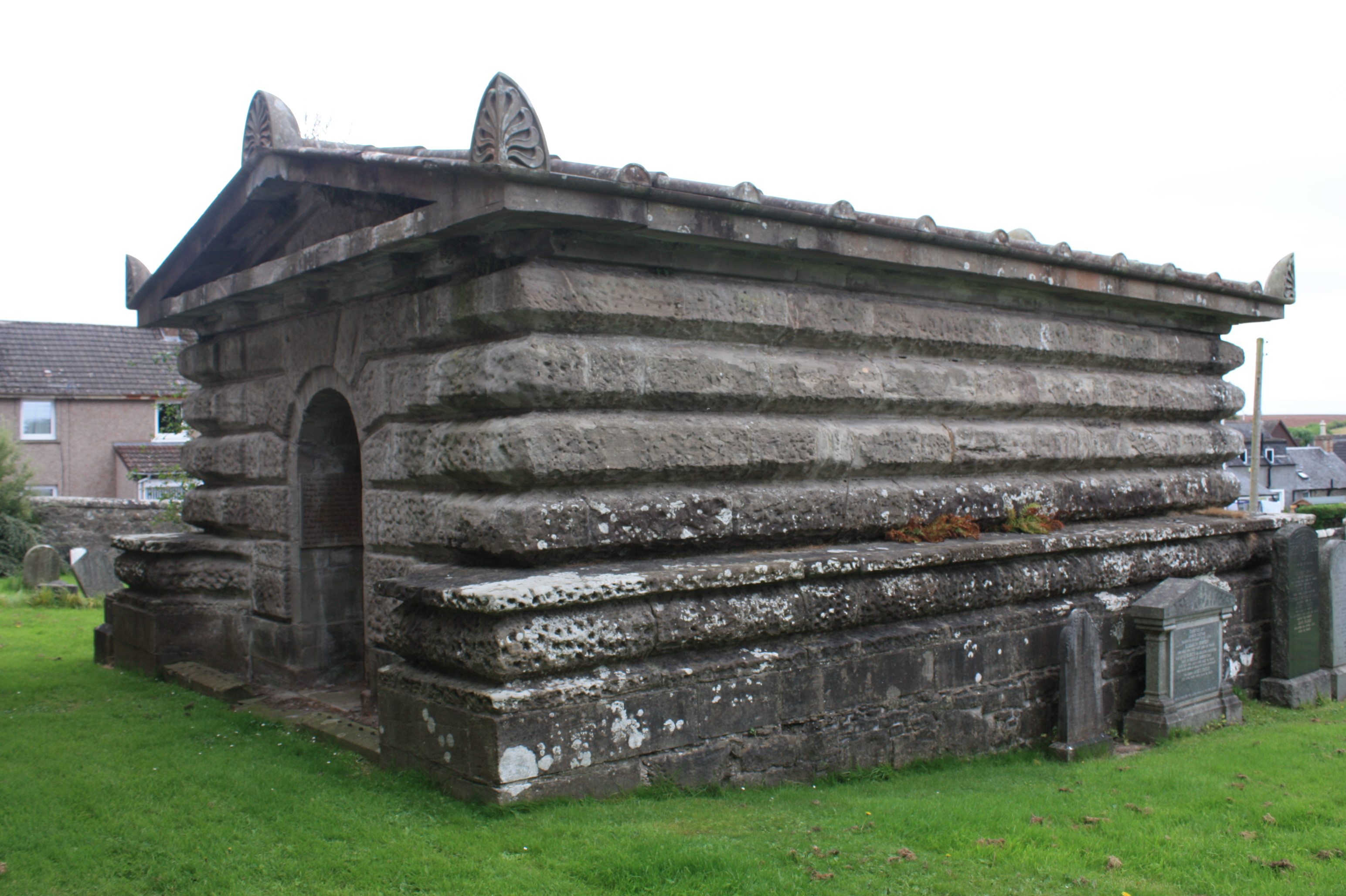
The burial vault of Sir Thomas Graham, Baron Lynedoch, Methven churchyard

On 3 May 1814, he was raised to the peerage with the title of Baron Lynedoch of Balgowan in the County of Perth, but, in keeping with his disinterested and high-minded character, he declined the grant of £2,000 a year, to himself and to his heirs, which was voted as usual to accompany the title. British and foreign honours followed: a Knight Grand Cross of the Order of St. Michael and St. George, of the Spanish Order of St. Ferdinand, and of the Portuguese Order of the Tower and Sword. In 1815, he founded the United Service Club.

He was raised to the full rank of general in 1821 and nominated colonel of the 58th Foot in 1823, followed by the 14th Foot in 1826, which he exchanged in 1834 for the colonelcy of the Royals. He was elected Rector of the University of Glasgow in 1813, and in 1829 appointed Governor of Dumbarton Castle.

He was noted for his vigour in his old age. He travelled frequently, visiting Italy, Germany, France, Denmark, Sweden, and Russia. In 1841, aged 94, he travelled through France to Genoa and Rome. His riding-horses were sent on to Rome, and he rode frequently in the Campagna. He died at his London home in Stratton Street on 18 December 1843, aged 95, after a very short illness: he rose and dressed himself on the day of his death. He was buried near his family home in a large and specially commissioned stone vault in Methven churchyard. The barony of Lynedoch died with him.

== Legacy ==
The names of Lyndoch township and the Barossa Valley in South Australia are derived from "Lynedoch Vale" and the "Barrosa Ranges", named by Colonel William Light, Surveyor General of South Australia, in December 1837 in recognition of his esteemed friend, Lord Lynedoch, who was his commander at the Battle of Barrosa. Both names were mis-spelt on early maps, resulting in the unique names Lyndoch and Barossa.

Graham has a house named after him at the Scottish private school Morrison's Academy in Crieff, Perthshire near his home of Balgowan. There is a house named after him at the English Private school Wellington College.

== See also ==
- Lord Lyndoch (1814 ship)

== Arms ==
Coat of arms of Thomas Graham, 1st Baron Lynedoch
Crest A eagle Or. Escutcheon Or three piles Sable within a double-tressure flory counterflory Gules on a chief of the second a rose between two escallops Argent. Supporters Dexter a dapple-grey horse regardant bridled Proper, sinister a peasant of Andalusia habited and bearing on the exterior shoulder a hoe Proper. Motto Candide Et Secure

== Notes ==
Parliament of Great Britain
Preceded by James Murray	Member of Parliament for Perthshire; 1794–1800	Succeeded by Parliament of the United Kingdom
Parliament of the United Kingdom
Preceded by Parliament of Great Britain	Member of Parliament for Perthshire; 1801–1807	Succeeded by Lord James Murray
Military offices
Preceded by The Duke of Gordon	Colonel of the 1st, or The Royal Regiment of Foot; 1834–1843	Succeeded by Sir George Murray
Preceded by Sir Harry Calvert, 1st Baronet	Colonel of the 14th (Buckinghamshire) Regiment; 1826–1834	Succeeded by Charles Colville
Preceded by Richard Lambart, 7th Earl of Cavan	Colonel of the 58th (Rutlandshire) Regiment of Foot; 1823–1826	Succeeded by Lord Frederick Bentinck
New regiment	Colonel of the 90th Regiment of Foot; 1794–1823	Succeeded by Hon. Robert Meade
Academic offices
Preceded by Lord Archibald Hamilton	Rector of the University of Glasgow; 1813–1815	Succeeded by Lord Boyle
Peerage of the United Kingdom
New creation	Baron Lynedoch; 1814–1843	Extinct
