= Lord Lyndoch (1814 ship) =

History

United Kingdom
- Name: Lord Lyndoch
- Namesake: Thomas Graham, 1st Baron Lynedoch
- Builder: Matthew Smith, Sulkea, Calcutta
- Launched: 27 October 1814
- Fate: Last listed in 1847

General characteristics
- Tons burthen: 589, or 600, or 632, or 63245/94, or 638 (bm)
- Length: Overall: 127 ft 9 in (38.9 m); Keel: 102 ft 6 in (31.2 m)
- Beam: 32 ft 10 3/4 in (10.0 m)
- Depth of hold: 15 ft 11 in (4.9 m)

Lord Lyndoch was launched in 1814, at Calcutta. After she sailed to England she made one voyage for the British East India Company (EIC). Between 1831 and 1841, she made five voyages transporting convicts to Australia, three to Hobart and two to Sydney. She became a transport and suffered a maritime incident in 1844. She was last listed in 1847.

== Career ==
Lord Lyndoch first appeared in Lloyd's Register (LR) in 1816.

Year	Master	Owner	Trade	Source
1816	Creighton	Goldie & Co.	London–India	LR

EIC voyage (1816–1817): The EIC had Lord Lyndoch measured before her voyage for them. Captain James Crichton sailed from the Downs on 23 January 1816, bound for St Helena and China. Lord Lyndoch reached St Helena on 10 April and Penang on 21 July, and arrived at Whampoa Anchorage on 31 August. Homeward bound she crossed the Second Bar on 28 December. She reached St Helena on 18 March 1817, and arrived back at the Downs on 27 May. Thereafter, Lord Lyndoch traded with India under a licence from the EIC.

On 28 November 1817, Lord Lyndoch, Templeton, master, ran on shore at Blackwall, but was gotten off the next day after she had taken out her guns, anchors, and cables. She had not sustained any damage and was expected to resume her voyage to Rio de Janeiro, the River Plate, and Batavia.

Year	Master	Owner	Trade	Source
1818	Creighton; Templeton	Goldie & Co.	London–India	Register of Shipping (RS)
1823	Templeton	Goldie & Co.	London–India	RS

Lord Lyndoch sailed from Valparaiso on 3 September 1819, to the copper ports of Coquimbo, Guasco, and Copiapo. First Officer Andrew Haig described her as "Master: Captain Templeton; 639 ½ Tons, Register, London measurement, but considerably less by the Builder’s measurement – She is very flat floor'd and a stiff Ship of her class, & carries a very large Cargo...". On 28 October, she left Guasco Bay for Calcutta, reaching the Sandheads, Hooghly River Delta on 10 March 1820. (Tasmanian Archives and Heritage Office document CRO83/1/1.)

The Registers were only as accurate as owners chose to keep them. In 1820, Captain Andrew Balfour Clapperton had assumed command of Lord Lyndoch. Though she did not appear in the 1819 volume of the East-India register and directory, she did appear in the 1824 volume (the volumes for the intervening years not being available online). Her master was A.B.Clapperton, her owners Alexander & Co., and her registry was Calcutta again.

Around 1822, Captain Clapperton performed a circumnavigation of the globe. He sailed via Cape Horn with a crew of lascars, and suffered no losses on the voyage.

In 1827, Lord Lyndoch was still listed as being registered at Calcutta. Her master was W.T.Harris, and her owners were still Alexander & Co. However, at some point she was sold to Beadle & Co., of London. She then returned to Lloyd's Register.

Year	Master	Owner	Trade	Source & notes
1827	Beadle	Beadle	London–Madras	LR; Decks & beams large repair 1827

In 1829, Joseph Somes, of London, purchased Lord Lyndoch.

Year	Master	Owner	Trade	Source & notes
1831	Beadle; Luscombe	Beadle	London–Madras	LR; Decks & beams large repair 1827
1832	Luscombe	Somes	London–Van Diemen's Land	LR; Decks & beams large repair 1827

1st convict voyage (1831): Captain John H. Luscombe sailed from Sheerness on 25 July 1831. Lord Lyndoch arrived at Hobart on 18 November. She had embarked 266 male convicts and suffered no convict deaths on her voyage.

2nd convict voyage (1833): Captain William Johnston sailed from Sheerness in June 1833. She sailed via Rio de Janeiro and arrived at Sydney on 18 October. She had embarked 330 male convicts and suffered four deaths on the voyage.

3rd convict voyage (1836): Captain John Baker sailed from London on 24 April 1836, and arrived at Hobart on 20 August. She had embarked 330 male convicts and suffered five convict deaths on the voyage.

4th convict voyage (1838): Captain William Stead sailed from England on 4 April 1838 and arrived at Sydney on 8 August. She had embarked 330 male convicts and suffered 19 convict deaths en route.

Lord Lyndoch was subject to an outbreak of scurvy, was the worst to have occurred on a convict transport. It first appeared as Lord Lyndoch was east of the Cape of Good Hope, and 160 men showed symptoms to a great or lesser degree. Eight men died of scurvy (the other 11 deaths were due to other diseases), and another 20 men died of the disease after she had arrived at Port Jackson. With a loss of one convict for every 17.3 embarked, this was the 10th worst casualty rate (not including the wrecking of George III), in the history of convict transportation to Australia.

5th convict voyage (1840–1841): Captain John Humble sailed from London on 9 September 1840, and arrived at Hobart on 5 February 1841. She had embarked 321 male convicts and suffered six convict deaths on her voyage. For this voyage Somes received £15 14s per ton burthen, for 638 tons, or slightly over £10,000.

Year	Master	Owner	Trade	Source & notes
1842	Humble	Somes	London	LR; large repair 1827 & damages repaired 1829

She then became a transport with Thomas Cauney, or J. Canney, master.

Lord Lyndoch was damaged by fire before 4 January 1844. She was on a voyage from Singapore to Madras. She was carrying the headquarters and part of the 24th regiment of Foot. The fire started with the ignition of some spirits in the spirit room and burned for three to four hours before it was put out.

== Fate ==
Lord Lyndoch underwent small repairs in 1845. In 1847, she was removed from Lloyd's Register, no reason given.
