= Chapel of the Madonna of Loreto =

- Chapel of the Madonna of Loreto
- Kappella tal-Madonna ta' Loretu
- View of the Chapel of the Madonna of Loretu

- Location within Malta
- 35°50′29.8″N 14°30′3.11″E
- Location: Gudja
- Country: Malta
- Denomination: Roman Catholic

History
- Founded: 1676
- Dedication: Madonna of Loreto

Specifications
- Materials: limestone

Administration
- Archdiocese: Malta

The Chapel of the Madonna of Loreto (Maltese: Kappella tal-Madonna ta' Loretu or Kappella ta' Loretu) is a seventeenth-century Roman Catholic chapel located on the southwestern edge of Gudja, Malta.

The chapel was built in 1676, immediately after the 1675–1676 Malta plague epidemic.

During World War II it was used by the British military forces stationed in Malta. An nearby air raid sheleter is accessible through a well adjacent to the chapel.

Today, the building is no longer in regular use for religious functions, except in December, during the annual feast of the Madonna of Loreto, to whom the chapel is dedicated.

The chapel is listed on the National Inventory of the Cultural Property of the Maltese Islands.
