= St Mary's Church, Gudja =

Church of St Mary
- Archpresbyterial and Archmatrix Church of the Assumption of Mary
- Il-knisja Arċipretali u Arci-Matriċi tal-Assunzjoni tal-Verġni Marija
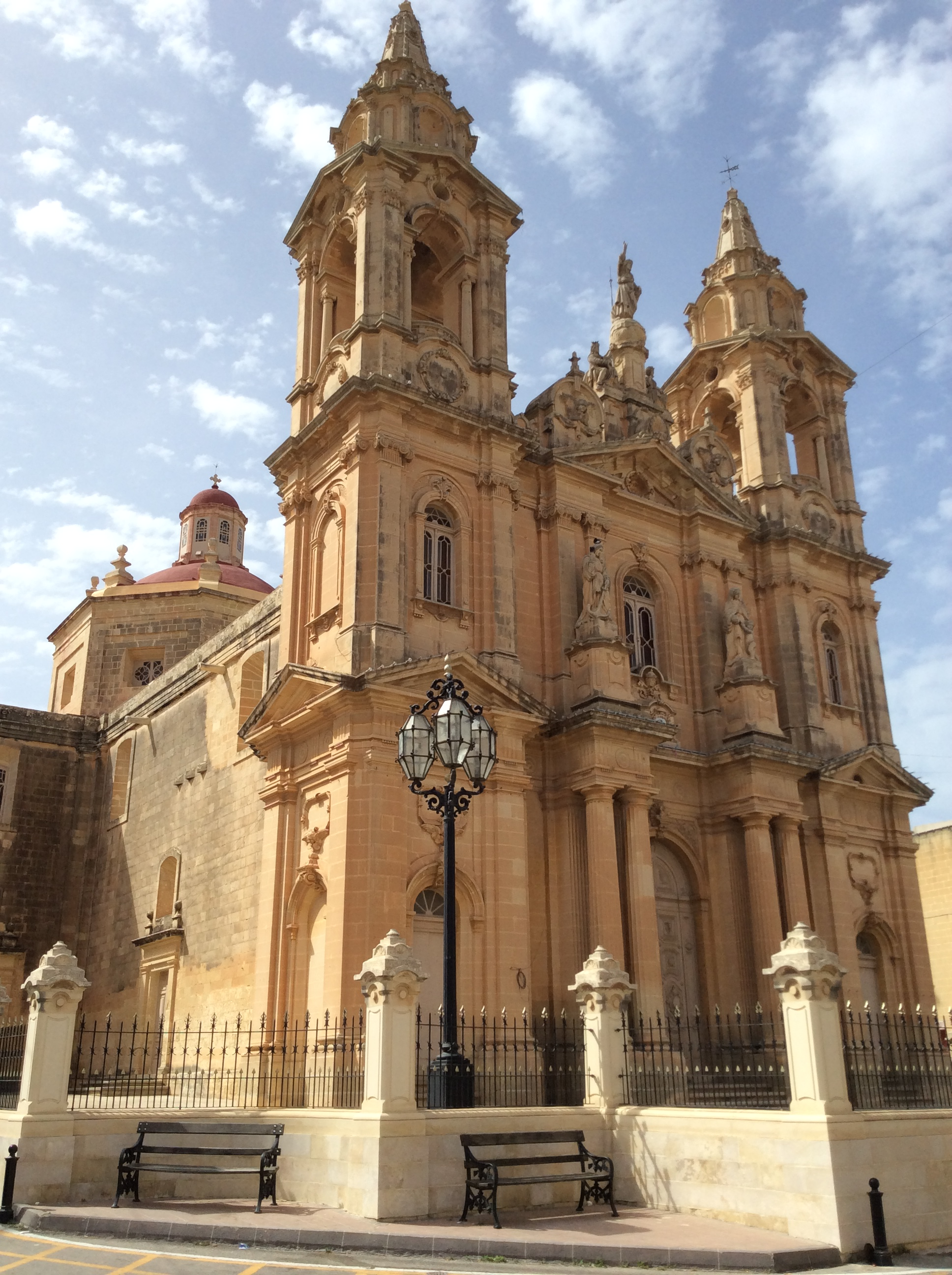
- Church of St Mary
- 35°50′53.4″N 14°30′08.7″E
- Location: Gudja
- Country: Malta
- Denomination: Roman Catholic

History
- Status: Active
- Dedication: Assumption of Mary
- Consecrated: 11 December 1785

Architecture
- Functional status: Parish church
- Architect: Tommaso Dingli
- Architectural type: Church
- Style: Baroque

Specifications
- Materials: Limestone

Administration
- Archdiocese: Malta
- Parish: Gudja

The Archpresbyterial and Archmatrix Church of the Assumption of Mary also simply known as St Mary's Parish Church is a Baroque Roman Catholic parish church serving the village of Gudja, in Malta.

== History ==
The parish of Bir Miftuħ, part of present-day Gudja, was one of the medieval parishes mentioned in the report by Bishop Senatore de Mello in 1436. The parish church was that of St Mary's Bir Miftuħ. After the population of the village grew it eventually moved away from the medieval centre. Consequently, the present Parish church of St Mary was built in 1656 on plans by Thomas Dingli. Construction was completed by 1666. The church was consecrated on December 11, 1785. In 1858 a third bell tower was added. In fact it is the only church in Malta with three bell towers. The third tower differs from the two original baroque towers. It was built in the Neoclassical style on plans by William Baker, hence the tower's name as the William Baker Tower.

== Interior ==
The titular painting is that of the Assumption of the Virgin, painted by Italian artist Pietro Gagliardi in 1877. The same painter was commissioned for the Our Lady of Mount Carmel painting in 1879. Another notable painting is The Death of Saint Joseph, by Italian artist Domenico Bruschi in 1884. The most important sculpture, inside the church, is the titular statue of the Assumption of Our Lady, sculpted out of solid wood, in 1807, by the Maltese Vincenzo Dimech. It is the oldest statue in the Maltese Islands when featuring the Assumption of Our Lady.
