= Ħal Resqun Catacombs =

Christian catacombs in Gudja, Malta

- Interactive map of Ħal Resqun Catacombs
- 35.8526238°N 14.4945603°E
- Type: Catacombs
- Location: Gudja

Site notes
- Owner: Public
- Public access: No

The Ħal Resqun catacombs at Gudja are interpreted as early Christian catacombs or paleochristian hypogea in Malta. The Ħal Resqun catacombs are especially notable for their carved decorations, and other features which are uncommon in Maltese catacombs, and of exceptional value. Some historians have suggested that, unlike other catacombs, those at Ħal Resqun portray enough Christian markers to be classified as paleochristian remains, while others view these features to be inconclusive. Some of the graffiti, interpreted by a number of historians as portraying a biblical scene, are thought to be unique in the world, and considered one of the most important remains from Late Antiquity in Malta.

First excavated in 1912, the catacombs were disturbed in 1887 during the laying of a water main. After a further excavation in the 1930s, the location of the catacombs was lost in the 1970s, with their exact location remaining unknown until their re-discovery underneath a roundabout outside the Malta International Airport in 2006.

The catacombs are again at risk of damage, due to proposed major roadworks involving the digging of a tunnel in their vicinity.

== History ==
The catacombs are dug into the local Globigerina Limestone. The catacombs were first excavated by Temi Żammit in 1912, and again in 1934 by Żammit and his son, C. G. Żammit; although Temi Żammit reported how the site had already been disturbed in 1887 during the laying of a water main. In 1975 the catacombs were covered over during roadworks, and located again in 1978, when they were sealed with concrete and an access slab hidden beneath soil. The exact location was then lost and only re-discovered in 2006.

The site is accessed via a flight of steps, four courses below the current road level. The doorway is flanked by two engraved columns, while the apsed arched entrance has carvings of a peacock and a peahen feeding a chick.

The catacombs contain an unusual number of fluted columns and pilasters, most of them short and in unusual positions. A small chamber lies at the foot of the steps, with a window tomb on the right of the entrance. Another window tomb faces the entrance, with a carved triclinium between the two tombs. The tombs contain fluted pilasters, sometimes twisted, circular decorations, and carvings including fish, and three heads (one upside down), flanked by outstretched arms. A fan-like design, possibly representing a winged bird is also present, as well as a number of animals, some also carved upside down. Żammit gave these features a Christian interpretation. The tombs have deep U-shaped headrests, and again include a number of sculpted features, including scallop shells, arrowheads and other motifs. A number of lampholes are also present.

An apsed arch is cut through by a modern wall, with a sizeable pipe. A step on the left leads up to the triclinium, which differs from other similar finds in Malta.

Żammit records that fragments of glass and pottery found in the catacomb "were also of the late Roman period," but this date does not indicate the first time the site was in use. More recent archaeologists have interpreted Żammit's classification of the catacombs as Christian with caution, stating that the iconography does not clearly indicate that it was originally cut or ever used for Christian burial. Cilia, however, presents a number of Christian interpretations to supplement the view that the hypogeum was used for Christian burials. Cilia also finds similarities in the style of the carvings with North African and Punic artistry.

== Conservation ==
A modern wall and a pipe have already damaged the site. An upgrade to the Malta International Airport roundabout was proposed in 2019. Two new tunnels are set to be dug on the site, beneath the roundabout. Infrastructure Malta has denied that the tunnel will impact the catacomb, with studies underway to protect them.

== See also ==
- Abbatija Tad-Dejr

== Bibliography ==
- Bonanno, Anthony; Cilia, Daniel (2005). Malta: Phoenician, Punic, and Roman. Midsea Books. pp. 348–349. ISBN 9789993270355.
- Cilia, Joseph (2001). A Note on the Interpretations of the Iconography at Hal Resqun Palaeochristian Hypogeum, Gudja (Malta). Grupp Arkeologiku Malti. pp. 45–48.
