= Xlejli Tower =

Tower in Gudja, Malta

- It-Torri tax-Xlejli
- Gudja, Malta
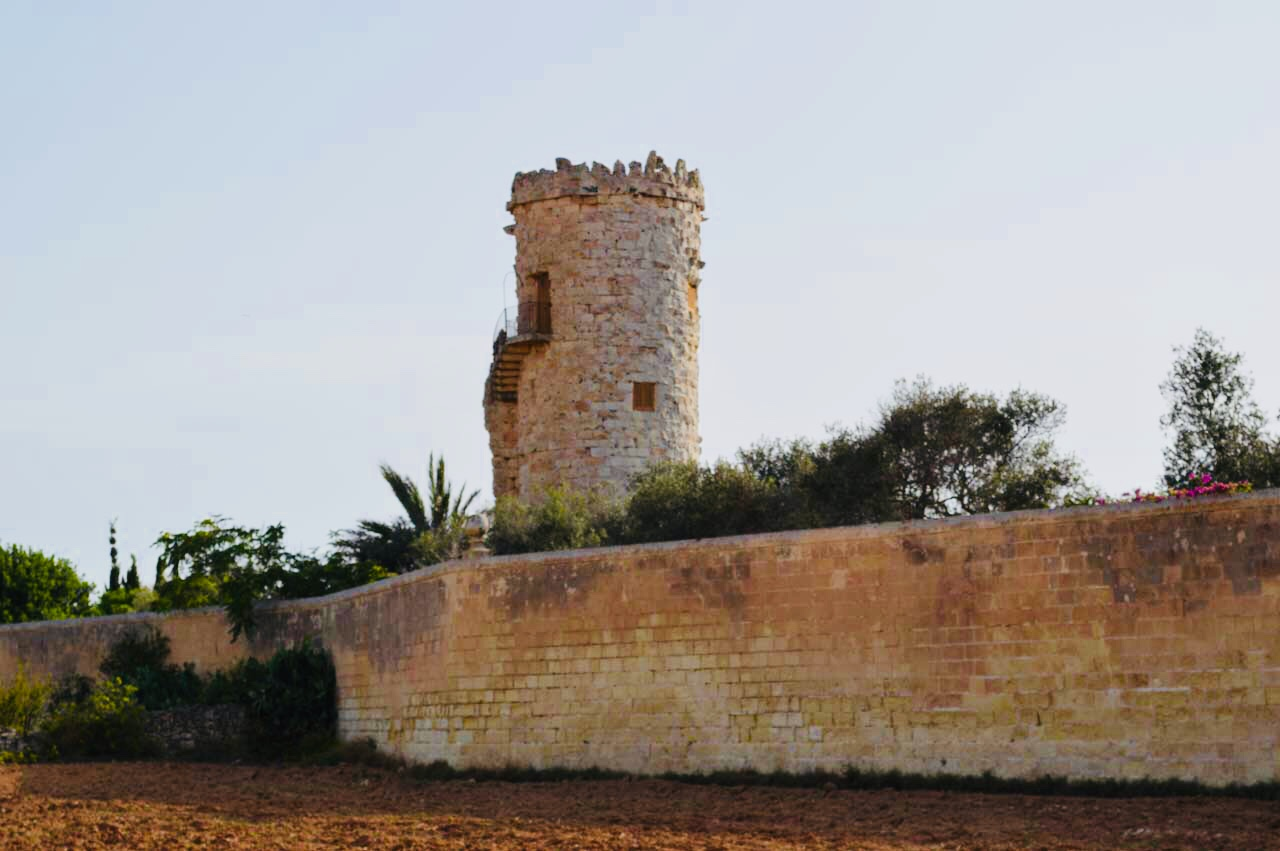
- View of the Xlejli Tower

Site information
- Type: Watchtower
- Owner: Private
- Open to the public: No
- Condition: Preserved

Location
- Coordinates: 35°50′59.9″N 14°30′27.6″E

Site history
- Built: Unknown
- Built by: Unknown
- Materials: Stone and glass

Xlejli Tower (formerly spelt Shilejli Tower, Maltese: Torri tax-Xlejli or Torri Xulliela), also known as Bettina Tower, is a tower in Gudja, Malta. It was probably built as a watchtower since it has views over a large area of land. The age of the tower is not known, and it could date back to the Roman or medieval periods, or possibly a later reconstruction. The tower is now located in the grounds of Palazzo Dorell, and is closed to the public.

== History ==
Its date of construction is not known, but it might have Roman origins. According to Pierre-Marie-Louis de Boisgelin de Kerdu, the historian of the Order of St. John, an urn full of Roman copper medals was found at the tower. The tower also has a round shape, similar to other Punic-Roman towers in Malta. It is believed that the remains of an old and round building are those of a watchtower. The Xlejli Tower was built in the parametres of these remains in an architectural style to appear as a ‘ruined’ tower.

The oldest reference to the tower dates back to 1570, when it was described as a lookout tower built in the 12th or 13th century. The tower was almost definitely built as a watchtower, since it has views of the southern part of Malta, stretching from Bengħisa to the Grand Harbour.

In the 17th century, the Palazzo Dorell was built close to the tower, and the latter was included in its grounds within a large walled garden. Since then, the tower has been closed for the public. The palace was the property of Marquees Bettina Testaferrata Dorell, and she restored the tower and decorated its interior. Due to this, it also became known as Bettina Tower after her. She had actually named it as Xlejli, which has a literal meaning of "tacked together" in old Maltese.

Some sources suggest that though the foundations of the old tower were retained on site, the present tower was built within the remains around 1780. In World War II, a bomb fell close to the tower, destroying a statue as well as an entire orchard. The tower is built of Maltese limestone and purposely used shiny pieces of glass, with an appearance of a ruined tower (hence the name).
