= Gudja =

- Local council
- Il-Gudja
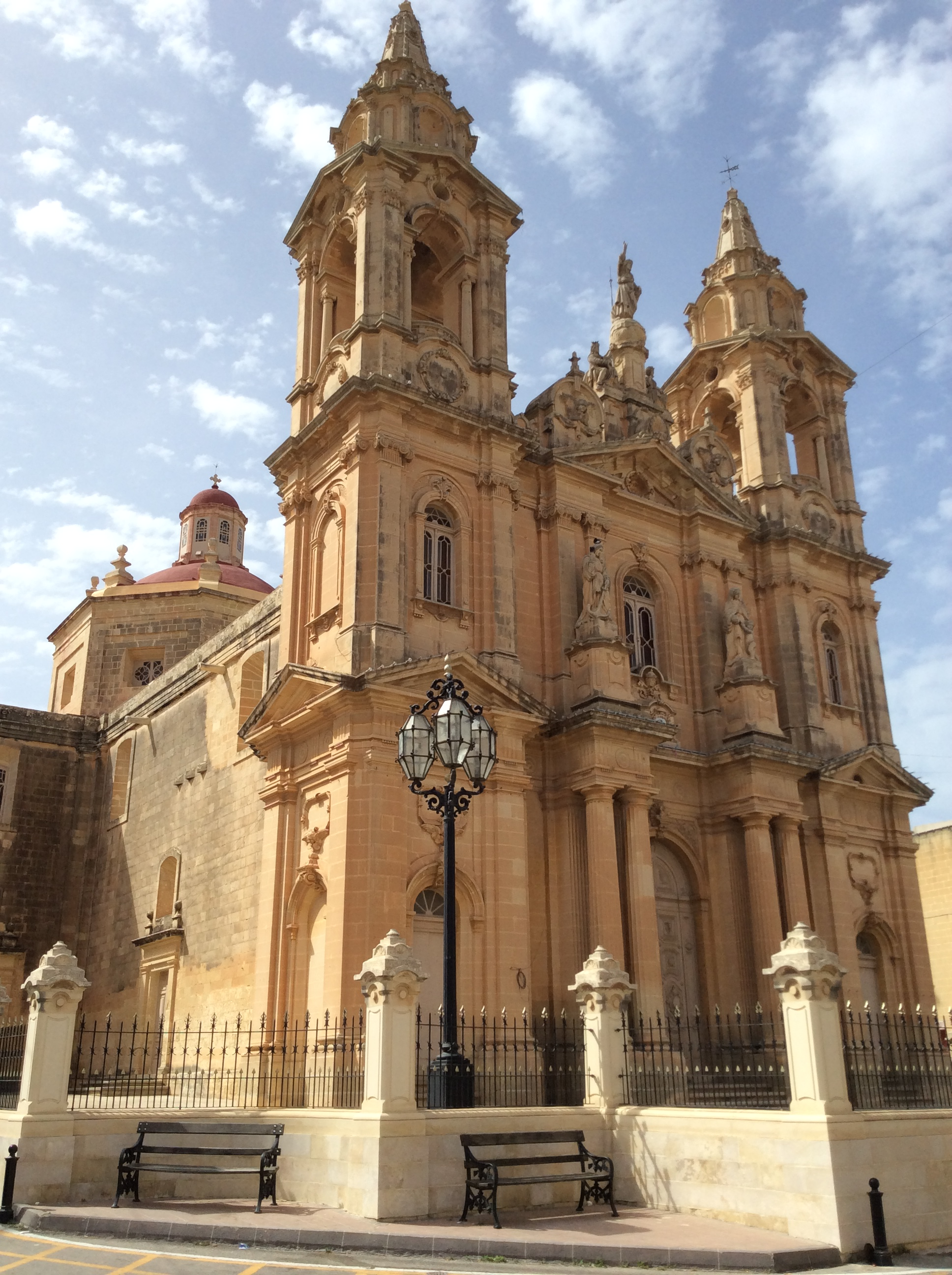
- Parish Church of the Assumption

- Flag Coat of arms
- Motto: Pluribus Parens
- Coordinates: 35°50′54″N 14°30′9″E
- Country: Malta
- Region: Southern Region
- District: South Eastern District
- Founded: Pre-1400s
- Borders: Għaxaq, Luqa, Santa Luċija

Government
  - Mayor: Romeo Baldacchino (PL)

Area
  - Total: 2.3 km^{2} (0.89 sq mi)

Population (Jul 2024)
  - Total: 3,501
  - Density: 1,500/km^{2} (3,900/sq mi)
- Demonym(s): Gudjan (m), Gudjana (f), Gudjani (pl)
- Time zone: UTC+1 (CET)
  - Summer (DST): UTC+2 (CEST)
- Postal code: GDJ
- Dialing code: 356
- ISO 3166 code: MT-11
- Patron saint: Assumption of Mary
- Day of feast: 15 August
- Secondary saints: Our Lady of the Rosary, Our Lady of Consolation
- Day of feast: October

Gudja is a village in the Southern Region of Malta. The village is located on high grounds, south of the capital Valletta. It is administered by the Gudja Local Council. A number of schools, clubs, public gardens and recreation places are found around the village. The population of Gudja was 3,501 in July 2024. This included 1,790 males and 1,711 females; 3,028 Maltese nationals and 473 foreign nationals.

The area has been inhabited since prehistoric times, evident from remains still in situ. Scarce Punic remains were found in an area known as Xlejli, within the village. Several remains of the Roman period are scattered in the whereabouts, particularly the Ħal Resqun Catacombs. The area was inhabited during the Arab and subsequent medieval periods, and the settling found today dates to the Order of St. John. The centre of the village further developed during the British period, after which a number of modern neighbourhoods were built.

The village has a concentration of churches, some dating to the medieval period, and other secular historic buildings such as Palazzo Dorell. Prominent buildings are now scheduled as Grade 1 or 2. Some buildings and a number of niches and statues are listed on the National Inventory of the Cultural Property of the Maltese Islands.

== Name and motto ==
Gudja means a land located on a higher ground but not a hill, with approximately round peripheries.

Gudja's coat of arms bears the motto "pluribus parens", which means 'mother of many children'. These children are Safi, Kirkop, Ħal-Farruġ, Luqa, Mqabba, Birżebbuġa and Tarxien, which at one time were all part of the parish church of Gudja. From Tarxien another three parishes emerged. From the latter, another parish emerged: the Our Lady of Lourdes parish at Paola.

== History ==
Gudja was inhabited since prehistory, as evidenced by Ta’ Għewra dolmen. Other pre-historic remains are found in Gudja, such as those at the entrance close to the Malta International Airport. as well as the Paleochristian catacombs known as ta' Ħal Resqun which are more than 1,600 years old. They were originally excavated by Sir Temi Zammit in 1912, and have only been re-discovered in 2006 by officers of the Superintendence of Cultural Heritage close to the Malta International Airport.

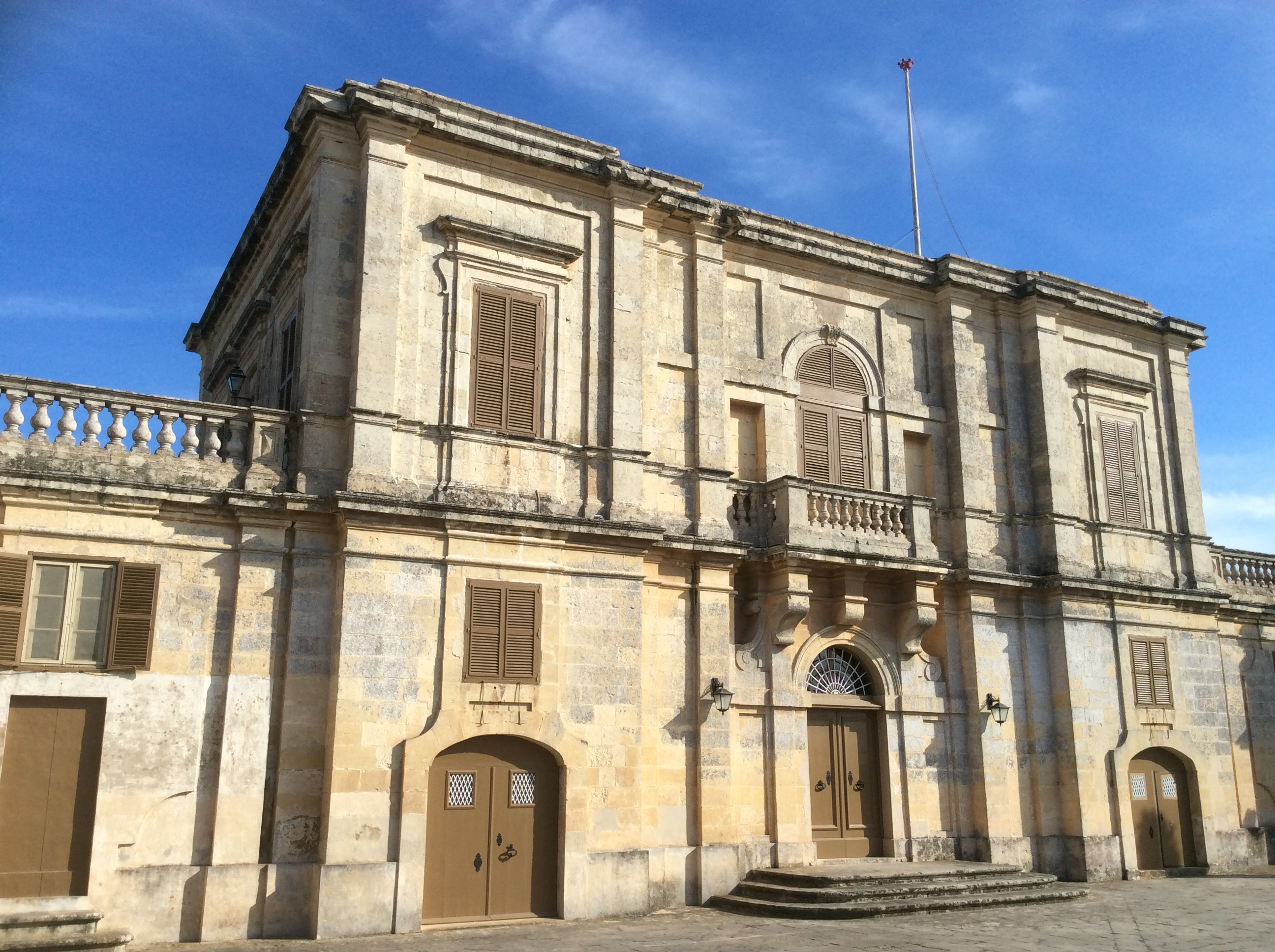
Palazzo Dorell, a prominent building in Gudja

The oldest still inhabited houses in Gudja date to at least 1533. A house built by this date is located close to the main square. A Gothic inscription, with Sicilian influence and Greek letters, sheds history on this residence. Though the words in relief are largely unreadable, there are old photographs and documentation on the considerably unusual inscription.

An unusual tower dating to 1780 was built on the spot of a possible Punic-Roman tower in an area known as Xlejli. A palace, known as Palazzo Dorell, was built nearby and its garden has enclosed the tower within its grounds. The palace served as the headquarters for British forces under General Graham during the French blockade of 1798–1800.

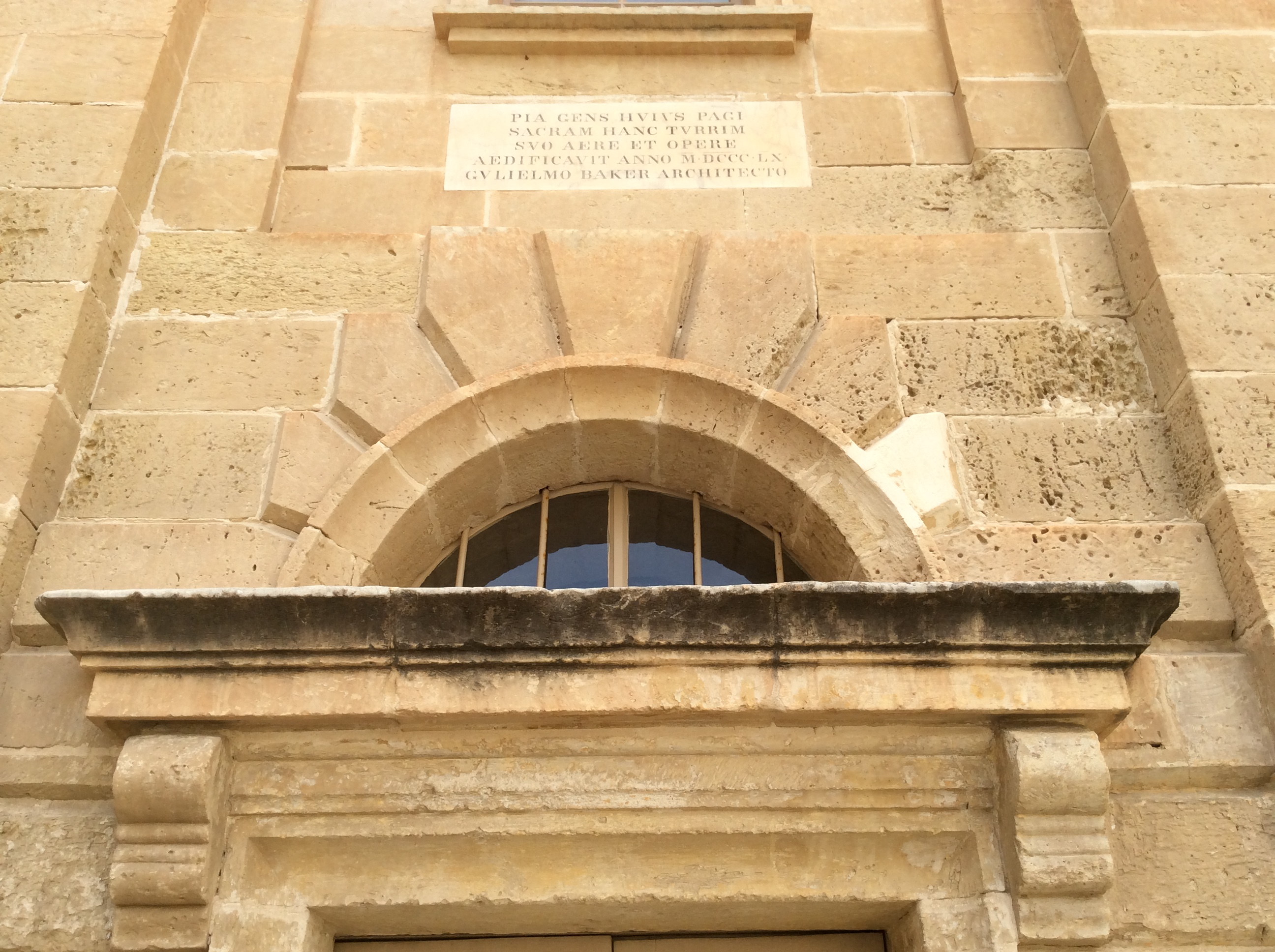
Plaque on the William Baker Tower

The Baroque parish church is dedicated to the Assumption of the Virgin Mary, and it is the only one in Malta with three bell towers. The most conspicuous of these is the non-symmetric Neoclassical William Baker Tower.

The interior of the church is decorated with objets d'art. The titular painting is that of the Assumption of the Virgin, painted by Italian artist Pietro Gagliardi in 1887. The same painter was commissioned for the Our Lady of Mount Carmel painting in 1889. Another notable painting is The Death of Saint Joseph, by Italian artist Domenico Bruschi in 1894. The most important sculpture, found inside the church, is the titular statue of the Assumption of Our Lady, sculpted out of solid wood in 1807 by the Maltese Vincenzo Dimech. It is the oldest statue in the Maltese Islands featuring the Assumption of Our Lady.

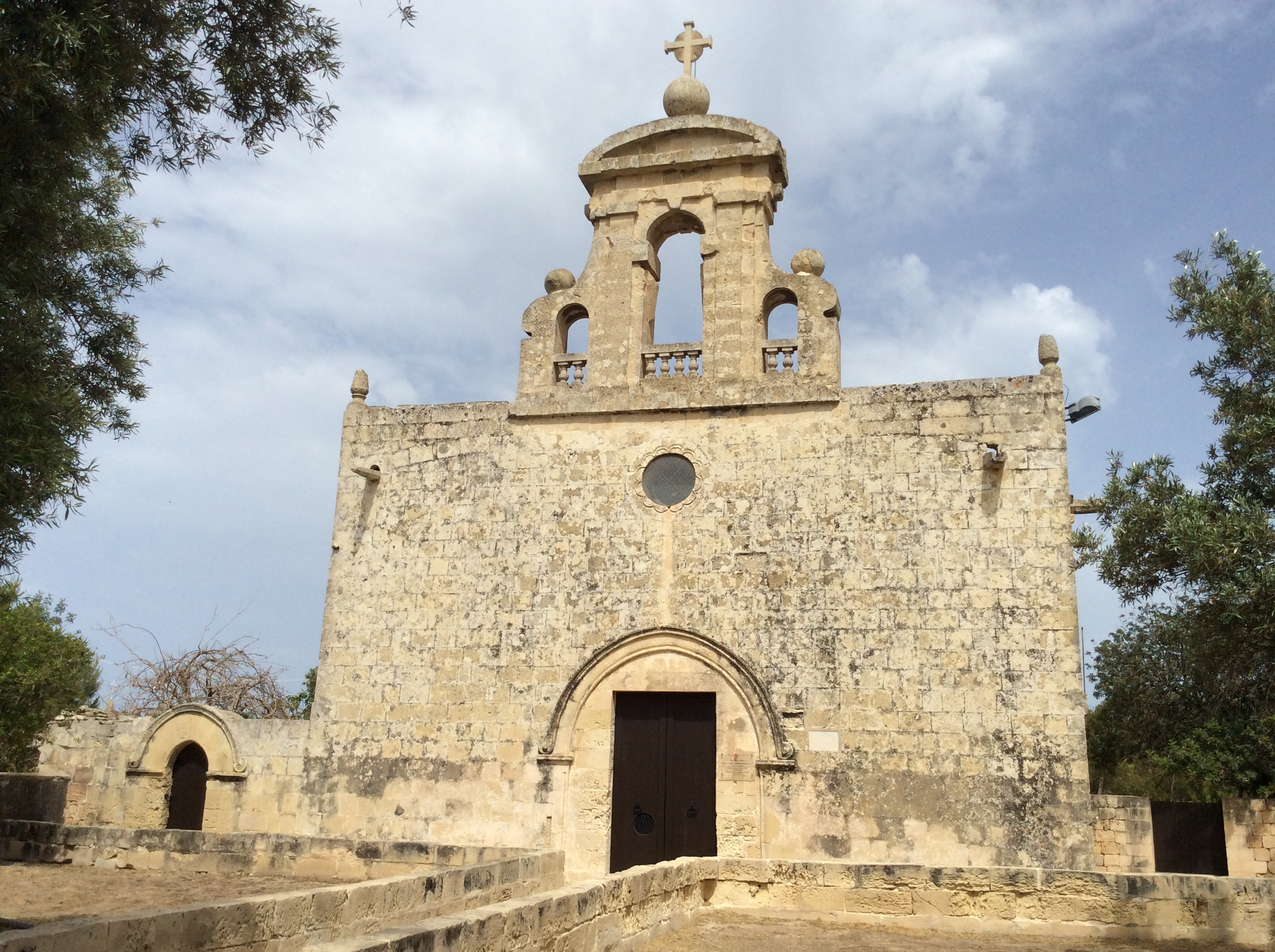
Chapel of Bir Miftuh

Gudja is known for its 15th century Chapel of Bir Miftuħ. Bir Miftuh was already established as a parish by 1436, making it one of the first parishes on the Maltese Islands. Pre-historic stones are found close to the site, now forming part of a rubble wall.

The Chapel of the Madonna of Loreto was built in 1548 by Knight Imbert de Morine as thanksgiving for his safekeeping during a Turkish battle which took place in the area. It was probably built on the same grounds where an older chapel stood.

The Chapel of St Catherine, found at Raymond Caruana street, is an Early Modern church on the site of an earlier chapel.

Raymond Caruana Street was named for murder victim Raymond Caruana. His assassination took place at the Nationalist Party Club and was politically motivated.

The Chapel of the Annunciation dates to 1754. According to the pastoral visit of Bishop Bartolomeo Rull, the chapel was built on the design of a Greek cross plan and with a dome. The facade is plain, with strategically placed architectural feats. Flanking either side of the facade, there are two flat, austere-looking Doric pilasters which are topped by a blank entablature. The main portal is surrounded with a stone moulding with emphasis on the two corners above the door. Above the door is a triangular pediment with an arch embedded within. Piercing the facade, there is a window executed in the Baroque style. This window and a square belfry on top were added by sculptor and mason Anglu Dalli on the design of Carlo Farrugia. At the corners of the facade are two statues representing St Anne and St Joachim, while on the belfry there is a figure of the archangel Gabriel. These are the work of Antonio Zammit.

The architect Girolamo Cassar, who is known for designing many buildings in Valletta, was possibly born in Gudja.

== Schools ==
- St Benedict's College, Gudja Primary School, St. Mark Street
- St. Joan Antide Primary School, Filippu Castagna Street

== Zones in Gudja ==
- Bir Miftuħ ('Open Well')
- Ta' Loretu (Loreto's Village)
- Ta' Xlejli
- Tal-Ħamra (Reddish Village)
- Tal-Lampat
- Tal-Lebbien
- Tal-Mitħna (Mill's Village)
- Tat-Tajjara (Cotton's Village)

== Main roads ==
- Dawret il-Gudja (Gudja By-Pass)
- Triq Bir Miftuħ (Bir Miftuh Road)
- Triq Ħal-Far (Hal Far Road)
- Triq Ħal-Tarxien (Tarxien Road)
- Triq il-Kbira (Main Street)
- Triq iż-Żebbuġa (Olive Street)
- Triq Raymond Caruana (Raymond Caruana Street)
- Vjal l-Avjazzjoni (Aviation Avenue)
- Triq Ħal-Ghaxaq (Ghaxaq Road)
- Triq Ħal-Resqun (Resqun Street)

== Organisations ==
=== Musical groups ===
- Soċjeta Filarmonika La Stella
- Ghaqda Muzikali Marija Assunta
- Kor u Orkestra 'Assumpta Est'

== Sport ==
=== Football ===
Gudja's football team is known as Gudja United F.C. They compete in the Premier League after achieving a historic promotion from the 1st Division in 2019.

The club was officially founded in 1945. However, the first-ever official participation in the Maltese League was recorded in the 1949–1950 season. The initial club colours were black and white, but were later replaced by red, which represents the emblem of the town. However, another change of colours was later adopted with the use of blue and white colours that represent the colours of the patron saint of Gudja.

=== Rugby ===
Although matches are played at the rugby pitch in Marsa, UM Wolves RFC currently train at the Guja United Football Ground.

== Government ==
The local authority responsible for Gudja and its constituents is the Gudja Local Council, which is made up of five democratically elected councillors. The first Local Council elections in Gudja took place in 1994 after the Local Councils Act was approved in Parliament in 1993. Since then, a further seven elections took place – in 1997, 2000, 2003, 2006, 2009, 2013 and 2019. For the first few years, Local Councils served for a mandate of three years, while for the 2009–2013 term, the mandate was increased to four years. The current Local Council is expected to serve till 2024, due to changes in the Act itself, which extended the term served to five years to coincide with the European Parliament elections, which also take place every five years.
