= St Mary's Chapel, Bir Miftuħ =

Chapel of St Mary
- The Medieval Chapel of the Assumption of Mary
- Kappella Medjevali ta' Santa Marija
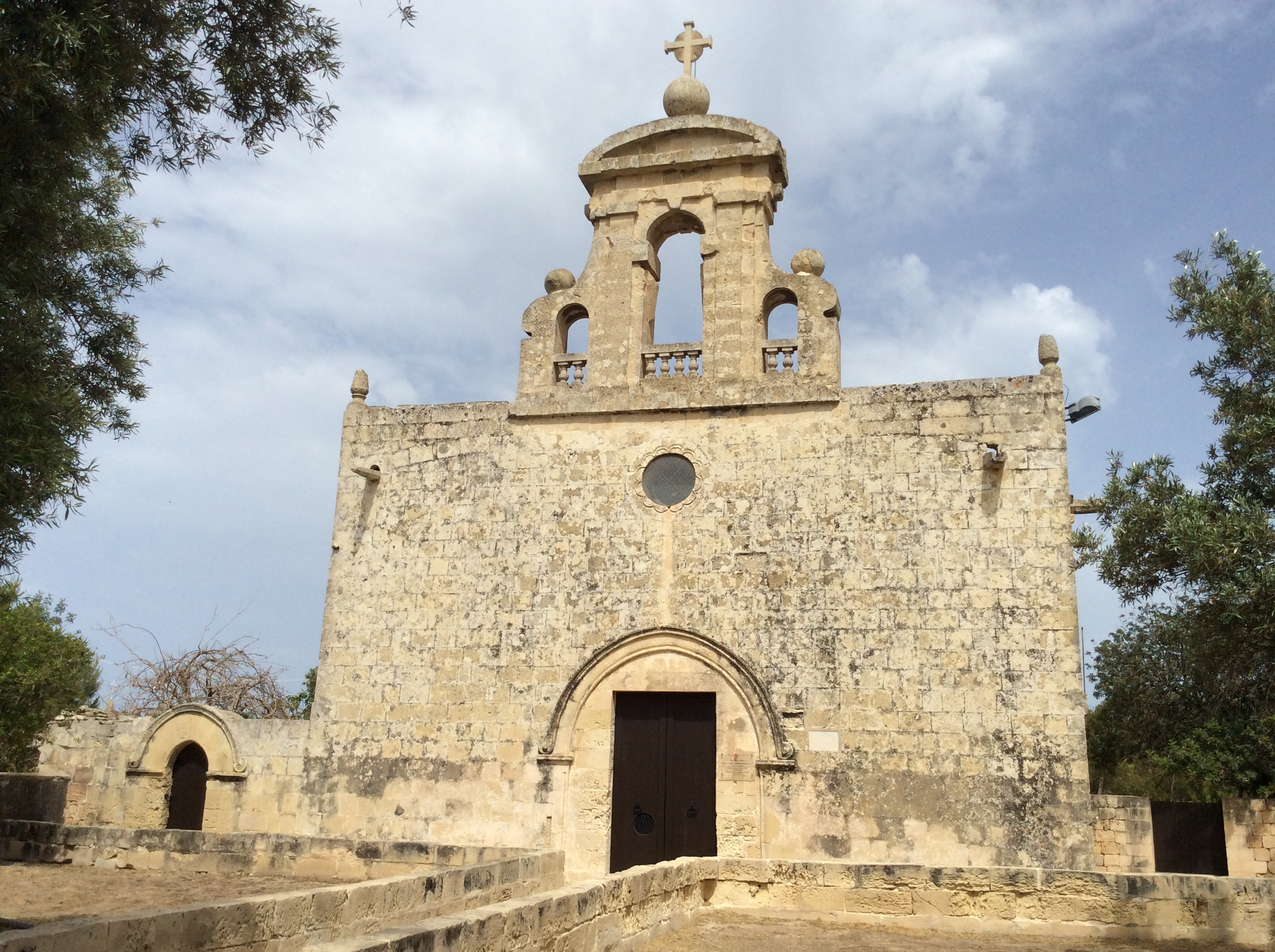
- View of the Chapel of St Mary, Ta' Bir Miftuh

- Location within Malta
- 35°51′05.9″N 14°29′50.8″E
- Location: Gudja
- Country: Malta
- Denomination: Roman Catholic

History
- Dedication: Assumption of Mary

Architecture
- Style: Medieval

Administration
- Archdiocese: Malta

The Chapel of St Mary (Maltese: Kappella ta' Santa Marija) is a medieval chapel located in Bir Miftuħ, limits of Gudja, Malta.

== History ==
The Chapel of St Mary was built some time in the fifteenth-century, most probably in around 1430.

In 1436, the chapel was mentioned as one of the 12 existing parishes by Bishop Senatore de Mello; it is believed to have existed long before that. It was not in the village centre, but mainly covered the areas of Gudja, Ħal Kirkop, Ħal Safi, Mqabba, Ħal Tarxien, Ħal Luqa, Ħal Farruġ and Birżebbuġa.

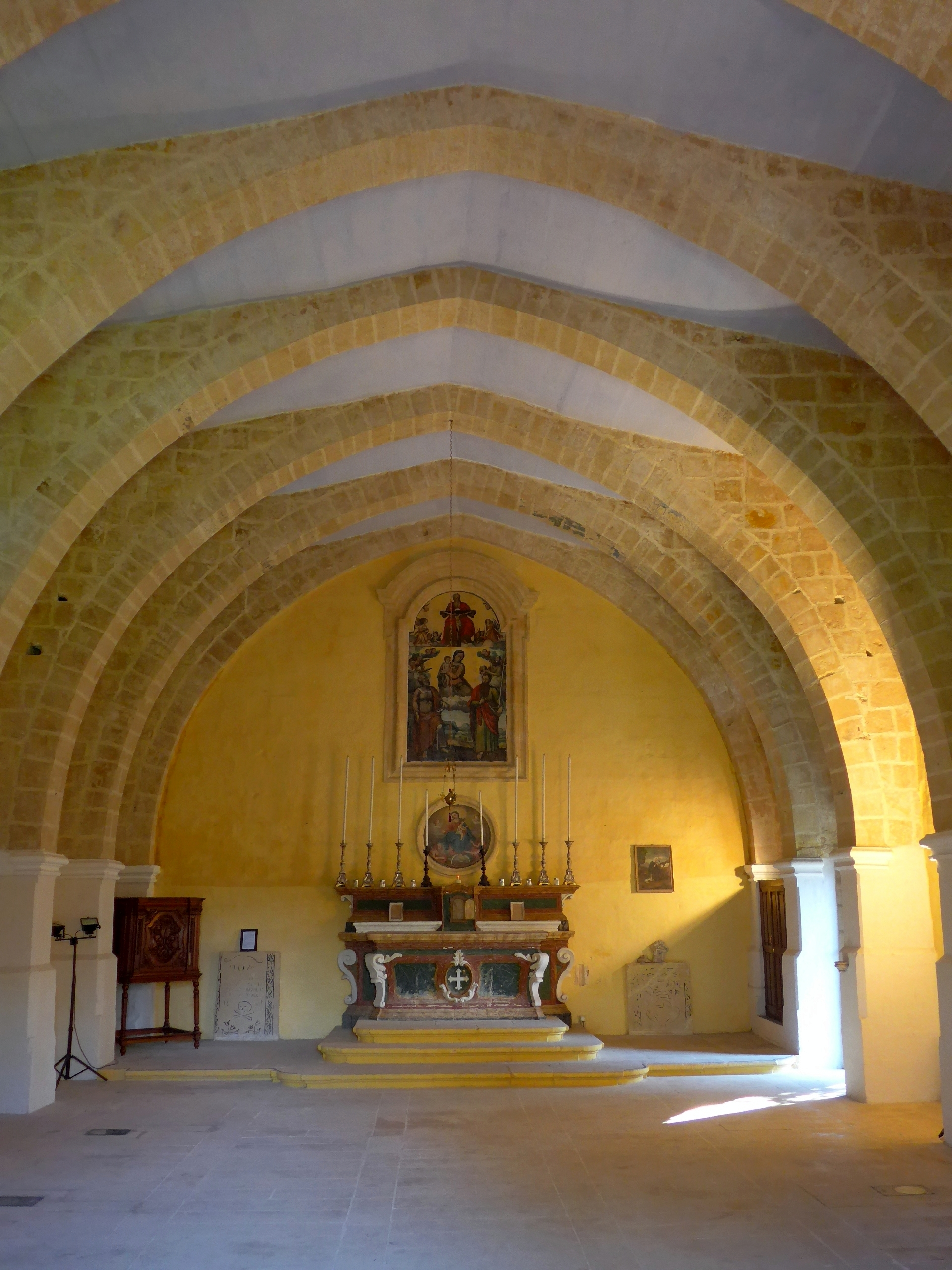
Interior of the chapel

The chapel stands freely and has a rectangular plan which measures about eleven by fourteen metres. Having said that, it was originally built in the shape of a cross. In 1512, the rear end of the chapel was demolished and the stones were used in the construction of the present church. It also had six doors though only two remain. The church served as parish church until 1676 when the present church was built. A belfry was added in the 16th century.

On the arrival of the Knights of St John, a captain was appointed to defend the area of Bir Miftuħ. In 1565, during the Great Siege of Malta, the church was desecrated by the invading Turks. It is said that in order to preserve the treasures of the church, including the bells, from the invaders, the people buried them in the tombs of the church.

The church was visited by the Apostolic Delegate Monsignor Pietro Dusina in 1575 who found it well equipped for divine services. In 1655, the people of Gudja decided to build a new church in the centre of the village. Everything was transferred to the new church once it had been built in 1676.

In 1830, Bettina Muscat Cassia D’Aurel restored this church. On April 9, 1942 the church ceiling collapsed as a result of an air raid during World War II. The church was again restored by the parish priest of Gudja. Unfortunately, the church was abandoned until 1970 when it was handed over to the national trust Din l-Art Ħelwa. In 1973, the trust, sponsored by the Malta International Airport, started restoring this church. During the restoration, frescos were discovered above the front door. A new pavement was installed. Restoration was finished in 2004.

=== Present Day ===
Today the church is in good condition. Din l-Art Ħelwa is curator to the church and opens it on the first Sunday of each month from 9.00 am till 12.00 pm.

The chapel is listed on the National Inventory of the Cultural Property of the Maltese Islands.

== Interior ==
The altar painting dates from the 16th century. It is painted on wood and depicts the Eternal Father holding a crucifix surrounded by angels. Under the crucifix there is the Virgin Mary holding baby Jesus with St Peter and St Paul. The church has one altar which was consecrated on March 26, 1591.

=== Frescos ===
Frescos from the 16th century were uncovered between 1978 and 1980. Frescos covering the inside western wall were discovered under six layers of lime. Only parts of the frescos remain though it is clear that the topic is the Last Judgment divided into three tiers of figures.

The upper tier shows the Apostles and Mary with Christ in the centre. Various saints and figures are portrayed below this tier. The second tier shows the condemned taken into the fires of hell by demons with horns, tails and webbed feet. On the left side, one can make out the wing of an angel and the back of one of the faithful being drawn towards God and the Virgin Mary. The expulsion of Adam and Eve from the Garden of Eden is depicted in the lower tier. On the north wall, there is a fresco of a woman, in a costume typical of the 16th century, holding a lily in one hand and pointing to the main altar painting with the other.

== See also ==
- Culture of Malta
- History of Malta
- List of Churches in Malta
- Religion in Malta
