= Palazzo Dorell =

Palace in Gudja, Malta

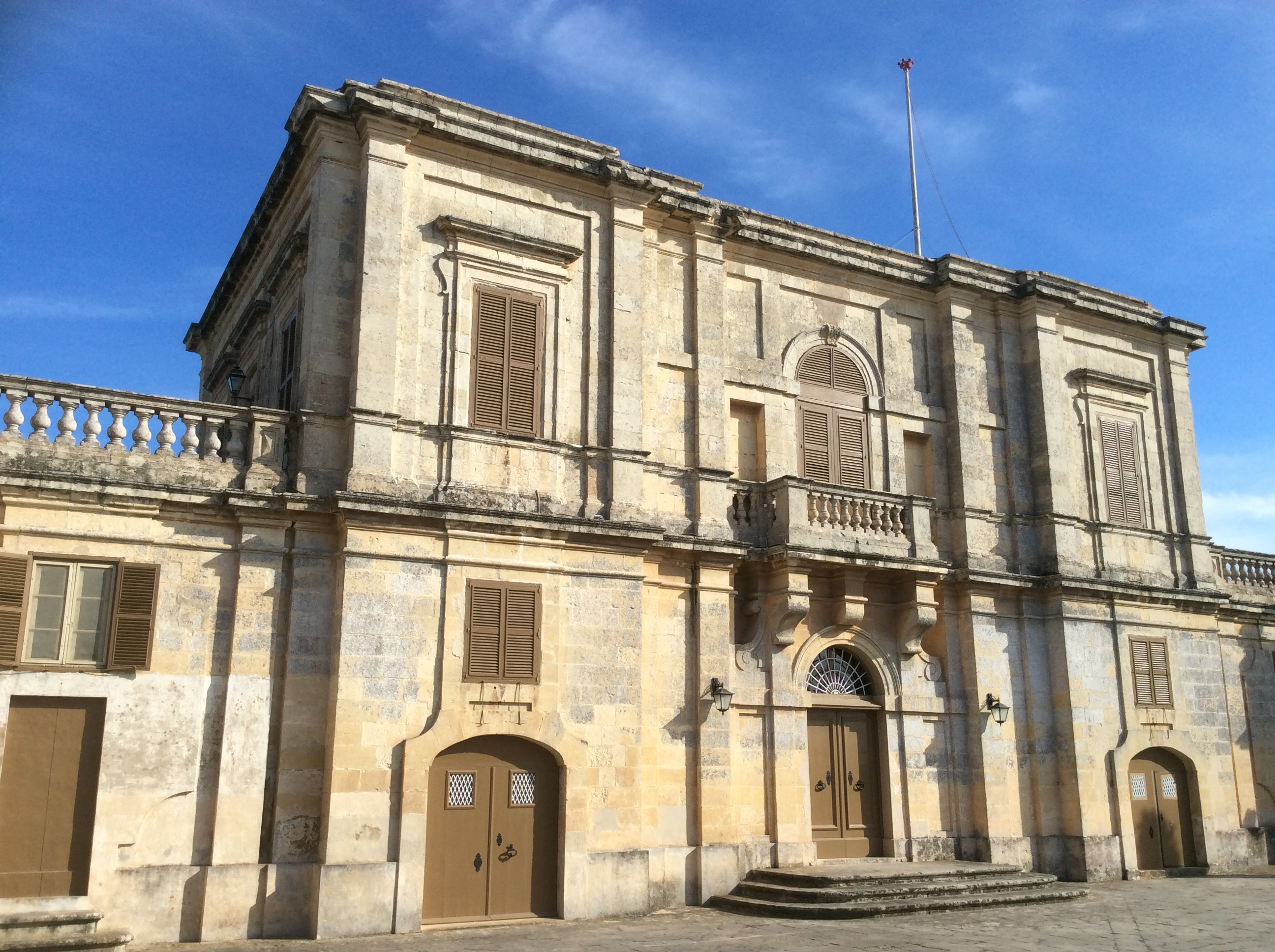
- Front façade of Palazzo Dorell

- Location within Malta
- Former names: Bettina Palace, Villa Dorell, Villa Bettina, Palais d'Aurelle

General information
- Status: Intact
- Type: Hunting lodge Palace
- Architectural style: Palladian architecture
- Location: Gudja, Malta
- Coordinates: 35°51′2.27″N 14°30′25.29″E
- Named for: Pietro Paolo Dorell Falzon
- Completed: 1670
- Owner: Gino, Baron di San Marco

Technical details
- Material: Limestone
- Floor count: 2

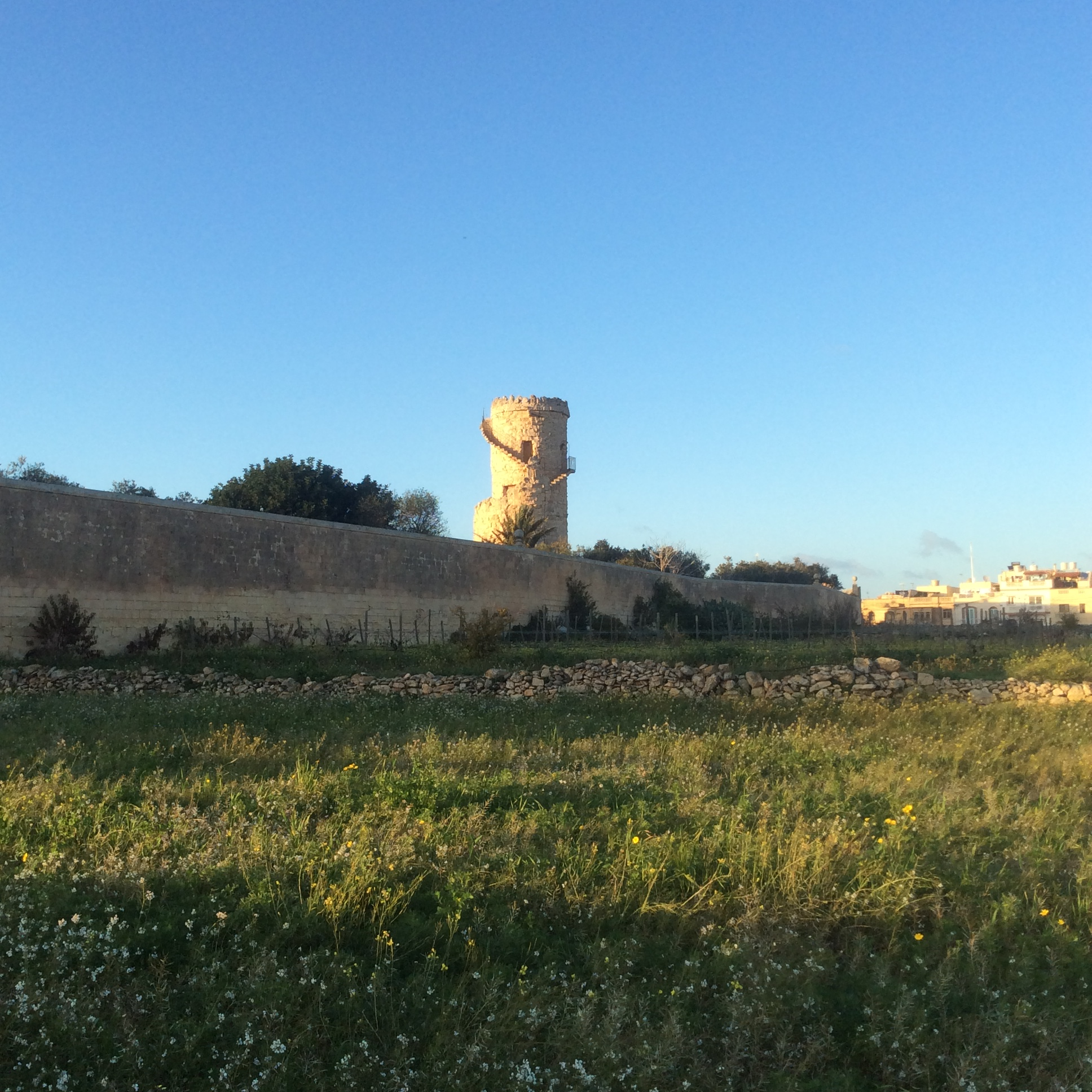
Xlejli Tower

Palazzo Dorell (French: Palais d'Aurel), also known as Bettina Palace, (Note: Also known asVilla Bettina, Villa Dorell (Villa d'Aurel), Xlejli Palace and among the nearby community as simply 'The Palace' (Il-Palazz),) is a 17th-century Palladian palace located in Gudja, Malta.

== History ==
The property was built during the Order of St. John by Count Ignatius Francesco Moscati Falsoni Navarra as a family home and country residence in 1670. The palace was bought in 1760 by Pietro Paolo Falzon d'Aurelle (English: Dorell) Falzon, and is interchangeably named for him and his daughter Marchesa Lady Elisabetta Testaferrata Dorell.

The palace served as the headquarters for the British forces, under General Graham, during the French blockade (1798–1800).

The interior of the building has some of the ceiling covered in frescoes which were painted by Antonio Grech (1758-1819), known as "Naici" (Antonaci).

It was the last building used by the British, with the consent of the owners, before having to leave Malta in 1979 on Freedom Day.

Since the 19th century the place has become limitedly open to the public with special permission of the owners, starting from the Patron Lorenzo Galea.

== Gardens ==
The Xlejli Tower and a chapel are located inside the walled private gardens of the property. In the garden is also a small cemetery where British armymen who died during the French occupation of Malta are buried. The garden is considerably large compared to other general houses. It has a French style.

== Modern ==
Today the palace is a private residence and is not open to the public.

The palace is scheduled as a grade 1 scheduled property by the Malta Environment and Planning Authority (MEPA) and listed on the National Inventory of the Cultural Property of the Maltese Islands (NICPMI).

== Other Dorell residences ==
The aristocratic French family d'Aurelle had other notable properties in Malta. The palace should not be confused with Palazzo Bettina in Birgu, nor Casa Dorell in Valletta; which both belonged to the same family once.
