= Ta' Ċieda Tower =

Ancient tower in San Ġwann, Malta

- It-Torri ta' Ċieda (Maltese)
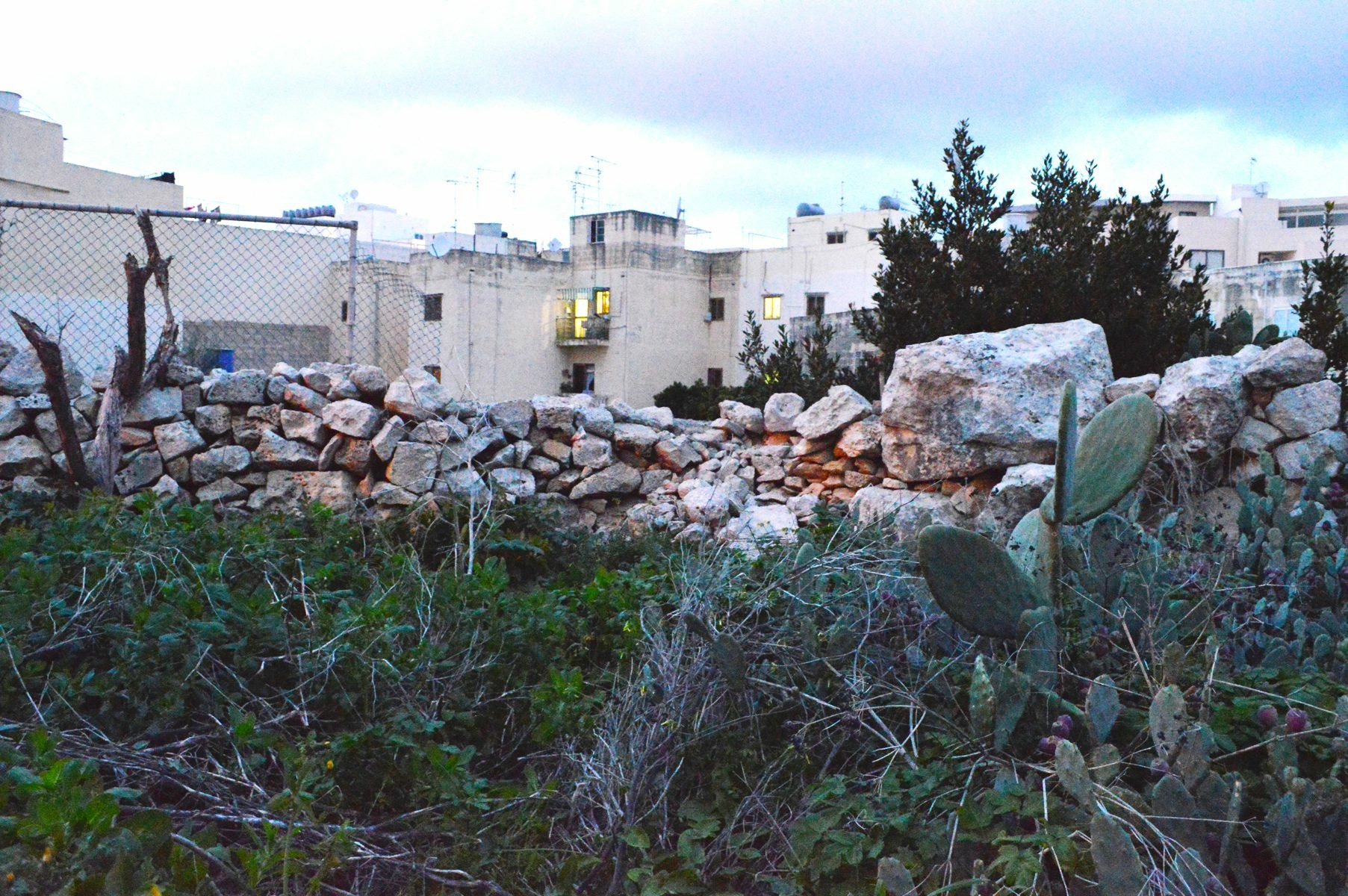
- View of the lower remains of Ta' Ċieda Tower
- Interactive map of Ta' Ċieda Tower
- 35°54′27″N 14°28′48″E
- Type: Tower
- Location: San Ġwann, Malta
- Part of: Punic-Roman towers in Malta

History
- Built: 3rd century BC
- Built by: Phoenicians or Carthaginians or Romans

Site notes
- Material: Upper Coralline Limestone
- Excavation dates: 1960
- Archaeologists: Thomas Ashbey and David Trump
- Condition: Bottom base and ruins
- Owner: Government of Malta
- Management: San Ġwann Local Council
- Public access: Yes

Ta' Ċieda Tower, also known as San Ġwann Roman Tower, is a Punic-Roman tower in San Ġwann, Malta. The exact origins of the tower could date back to pre-history with different architecture. It is argued that the tower could be of Punic origins rather than Roman but the latter have adapted it. The site of the tower was used as a cemetery, or more, during the Muslim caliphate in the medieval times. Following the expulsion of the Muslims in Malta a church dedicated to St. Helen was built on the site.

Today roughly one-third of the tower still stands and is neglected. The tower is one of a chain of towers that were built at their time, probably designed to aid each other from invasion coming from the sea. Eight coastal towers are believed to have existed in Malta and none on the nearby island of Gozo; six of which are known as the Punic-Roman towers. The remains of rural villa, consisting of a cistern and Roman wall, are found close by.

== Name ==
The name Ta' Cieda was given in the medieval ages by Christians of which origins is from the devotion to St Helen.

== History ==
=== Prehistoric origin ===
The area of San Ġwann has been inhabited since pre-historic times and evidence of this are the cart ruts in San Ġwann situated not far from the tower. Excavation have suggested that the tower may have pre-historic origins but archaeologists believe that some rocks may have had adaptive reuse. Indeed, the round shape tower suggests that it was built sometimes later as other pre-historic fortification in Malta show different construction of pre-historic defense. A Neolithic/Bronze structure has also been found close by at Wied Ghomor (Ghomor Valley).

=== Punic and Roman ===
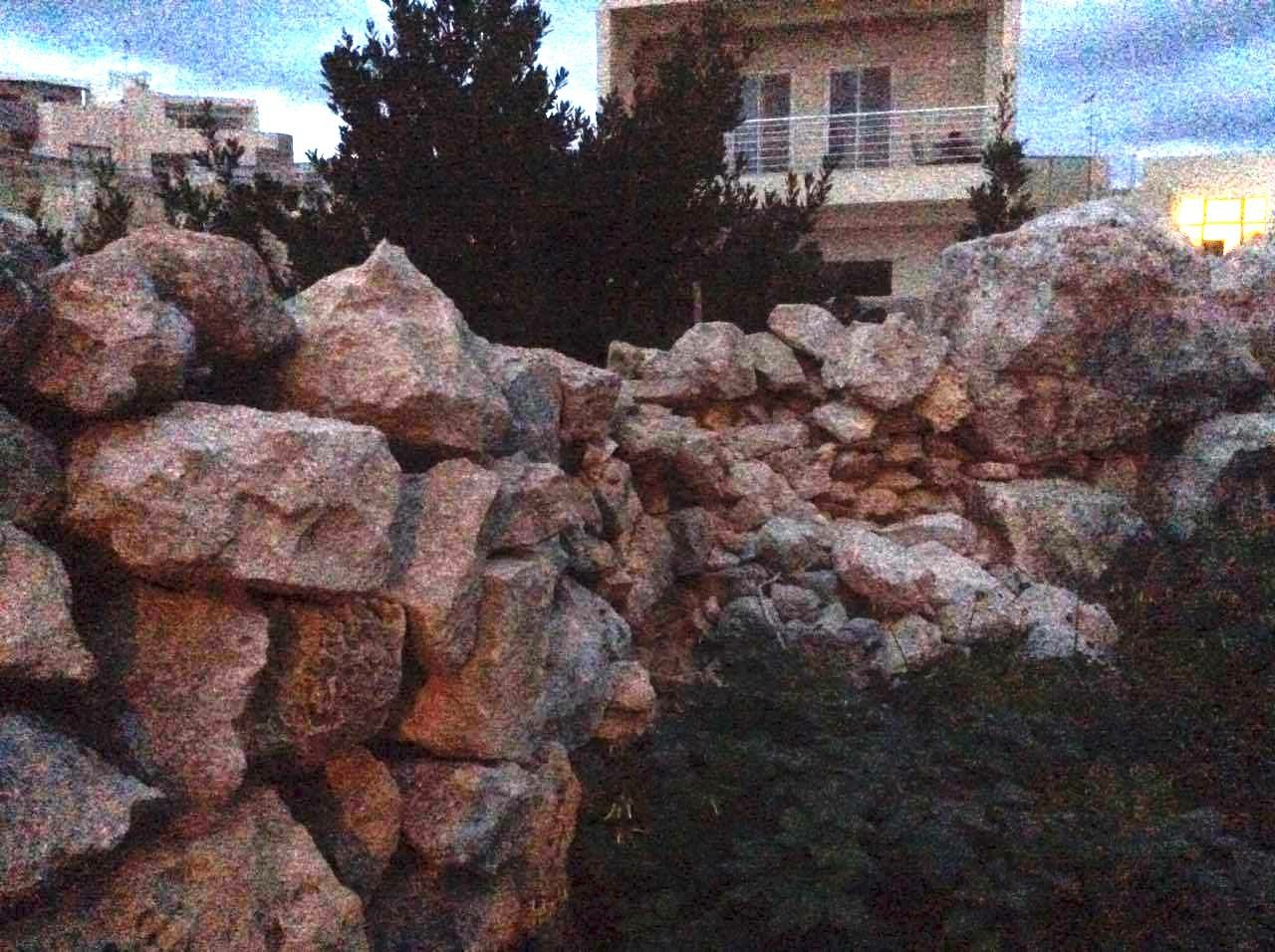
The Ta' Cieda Tower and modern housing at the back

In 1915 archeologist Thomas Ashbey said that the tower was of Phoenician origins. The tower is generally believed to be a Roman tower, hence the references as San Gwann Roman Tower or Ta' Cieda Roman Tower or Ta' Cieda Round Tower. Archeologists, such as Professor A. Bonanno, argue that speaking on the context of the time it is more likely that the tower was built during the Punic period rather than the Roman period as attacks were less likely during the latter. Round tower designs were already established at the time of the Punic period. Indeed, historians hold that the Maltese archipelago in the third century was at the aim of Carthage and the Romans by invading the native Punic civilisation. Despite these plausible arguments it is also argued that the tower may have been built by the Punic people and then embellished by the Romans. From the findings it is also suggested that the Romans may have built it in the form of a folly to overlook the plantation of the olive trees which originate in the area since Roman times. Even if so it is not clearly known as no Roman villas were ever recorded to exist in the area, but Romans did rule the islands for a long period. For instance Roman villas and Roman buildings were excavated near other Roman towers in the south of Malta such as in Hal Safi and Żurrieq, and as a chain of towers working together this may be also a plausible argument.

In 1960 Doctor David Trump has brought to the attention of a Roman cistern not far from the tower. This structure is historically important as the use of cement, that at times is thought to be a modern use, was used by the Romans that does not date to the Punics. This concludes that the origins of the tower is Punic but that the tower was readopted by the Romans. Roman pottery was unearthed and Roman tombs have been excavated and documented. It has been said that the tower "may have served as a centre point around which one of Malta's more important mediaeval settlements had developed out of late Roman economic activity in the area".

=== Muslim period ===
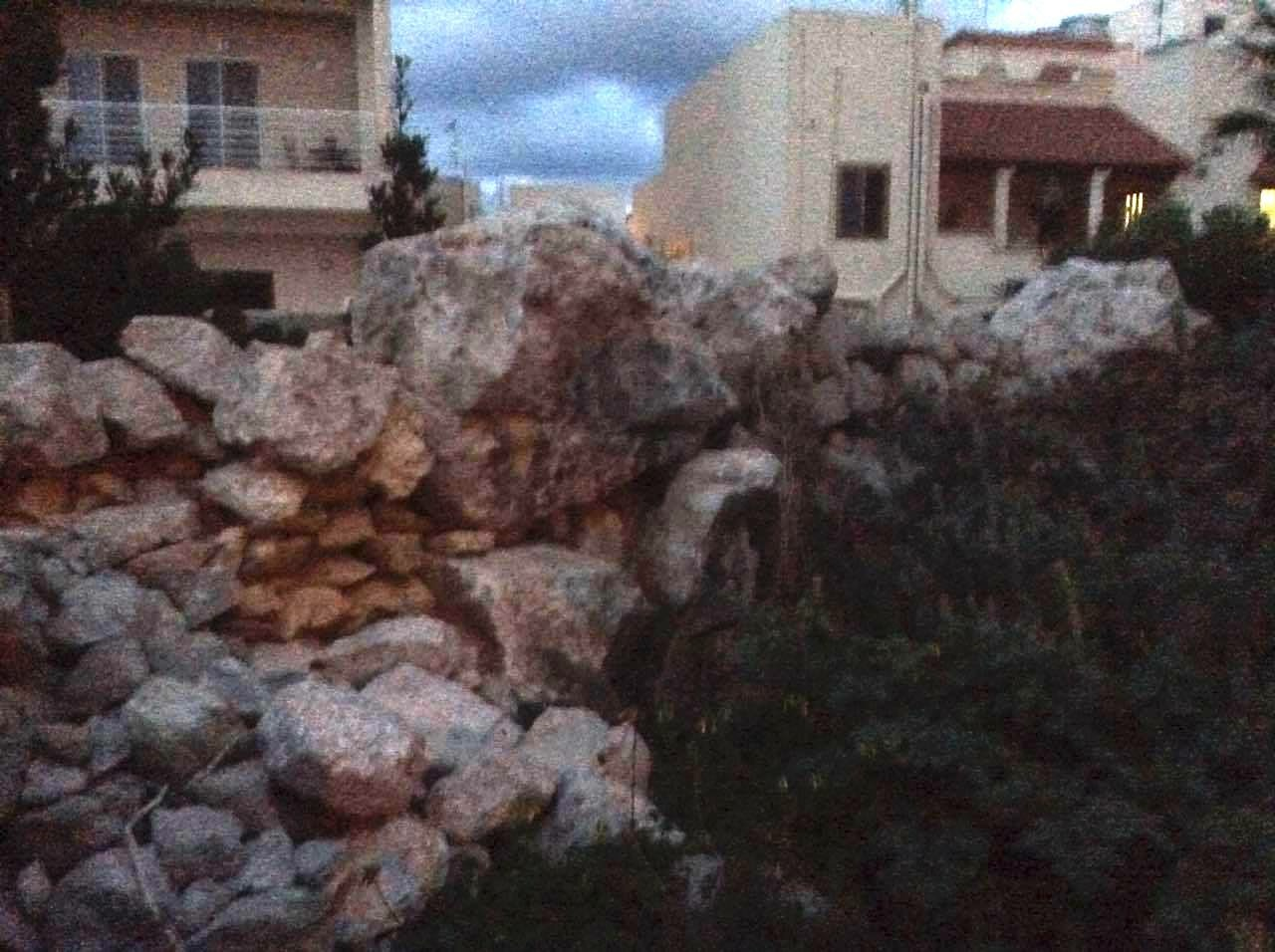
A different angulation of the remains

During the Muslim period the area at the tower is known to have at least been used as an Islamic cemetery, one of the early Islamic cemeteries in Malta. The reuse of former building by the Arabs was common as it facilitated effort from cutting rock. Some Punic and Roman building have been discovered to be reused in Malta during the Islamic caliphate, this could have possibly included the Ta' Cieda Tower. On site of the tower there were burial ground dating to the Arab period but these stone slabs and other evident Islamic symbol on the islands were eradicated after the expulsion of the Muslims from the lands. However several names of areas in San Gwann are still carrying Arab names. Some of the Muslim burial stones are believed to be found at the saracenic burials in Rabat. Some of the saracenic burial remains are still at present place at the Ta' Cieda Tower.

=== Christian period ===
The Islamic cemetery has almost completely disappeared from the site of the tower after the Christian came again to rule the islands. It is documented that close by the Ta' Cieda Tower a church dedicated to St. Helen was built. This church is important in the Roman Catholic Church's history in Malta as it was the first parish church to be built for the parish of Birkirkara. It is to note that back then, when the parish church was built, the San Gwann lands were all (or most of) part of Birkirkara. The church was named as St. Helen Church, also known as Capella di Birchirchara, built before 1402 and was abandoned in the late 14th century of which no traces remain. The title of the parish church of Birkirkara was transferred to the 'Old Church', namely the Santa Maria Church in Mriehel, Birkirkara. Today Birkirkara's parish church is also dedicated to St. Helen as St Helen's Basilica.

== Modern ==
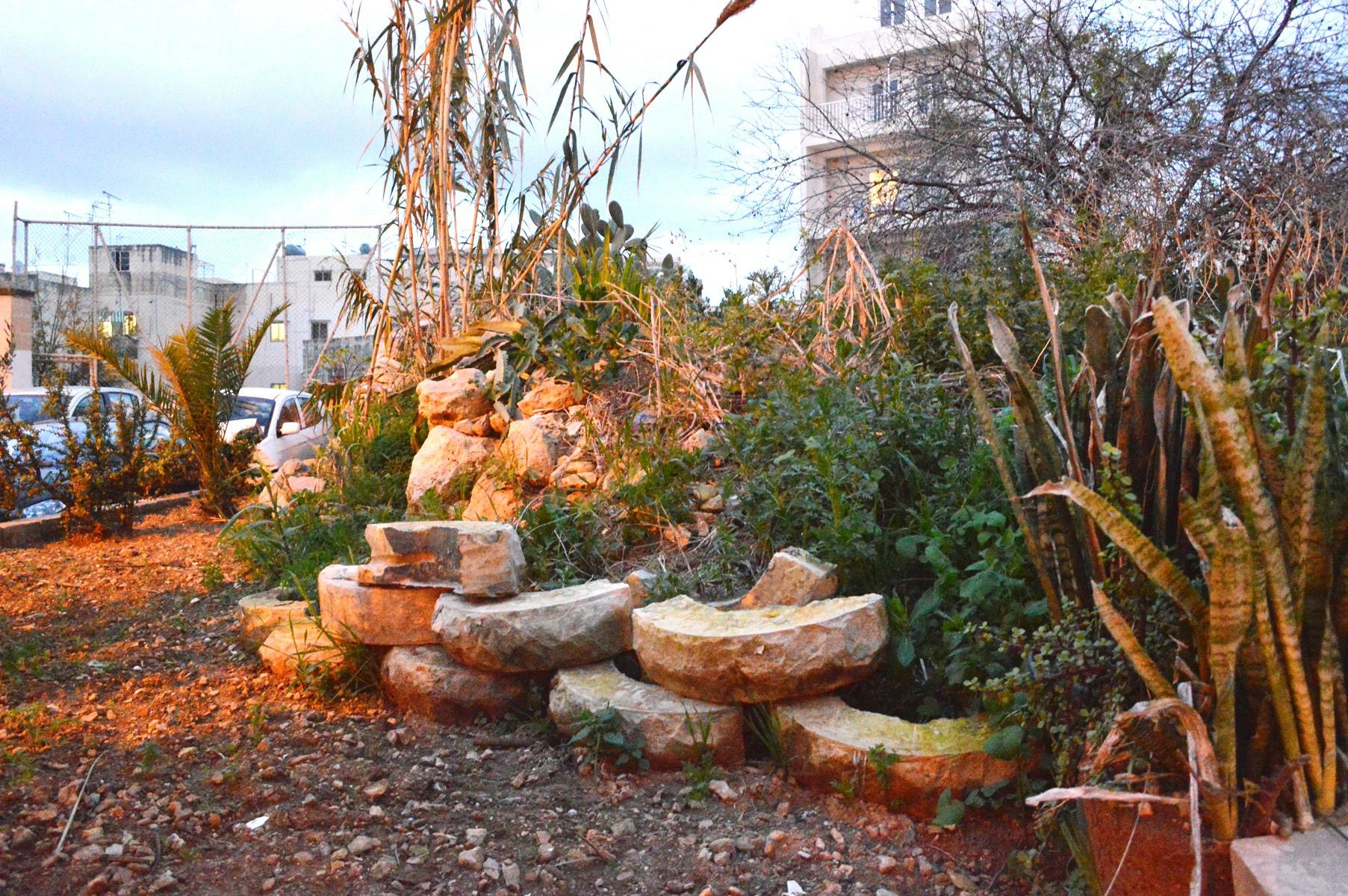
Vegetation, dumping and dilapidation at the site of Ta' Cieda Tower

The remaining base of the Ta' Ċieda Tower today is in a dilapidated state and subject to further deterioration due to vandalism and the growth of vegetation. It is located in Triq il-Baruza (Il-Baruza Street) surrounded by modern housing estates.

=== Heritage ===
The tower has been on a list of protected antiques of the Malta Environment and Planning Authority (MEPA) since 1932 with amendments in 1935 and 1939, when the area used to be part of St. Julian's. The San Gwann Local Council has successfully managed to schedule the tower as a national monument (together with other remains), by the Malta Environment and Planning Authority (MEPA), but has failed in addressing its preservation. The site have been an issue of development but because of the protection of the tower this was not permitted. Some of the remains have been used to build rubbles walls on site and the vicinity.

== See also ==
- Punic-Roman towers in Malta
- Ta' Ġawhar Tower
- Xlejli Tower
