= St Paul's Church, Safi =

St Paul's Church
- The Parish Church of the Conversion of St Paul
- Il-Knisja Parrokkjali ta' San Pawl
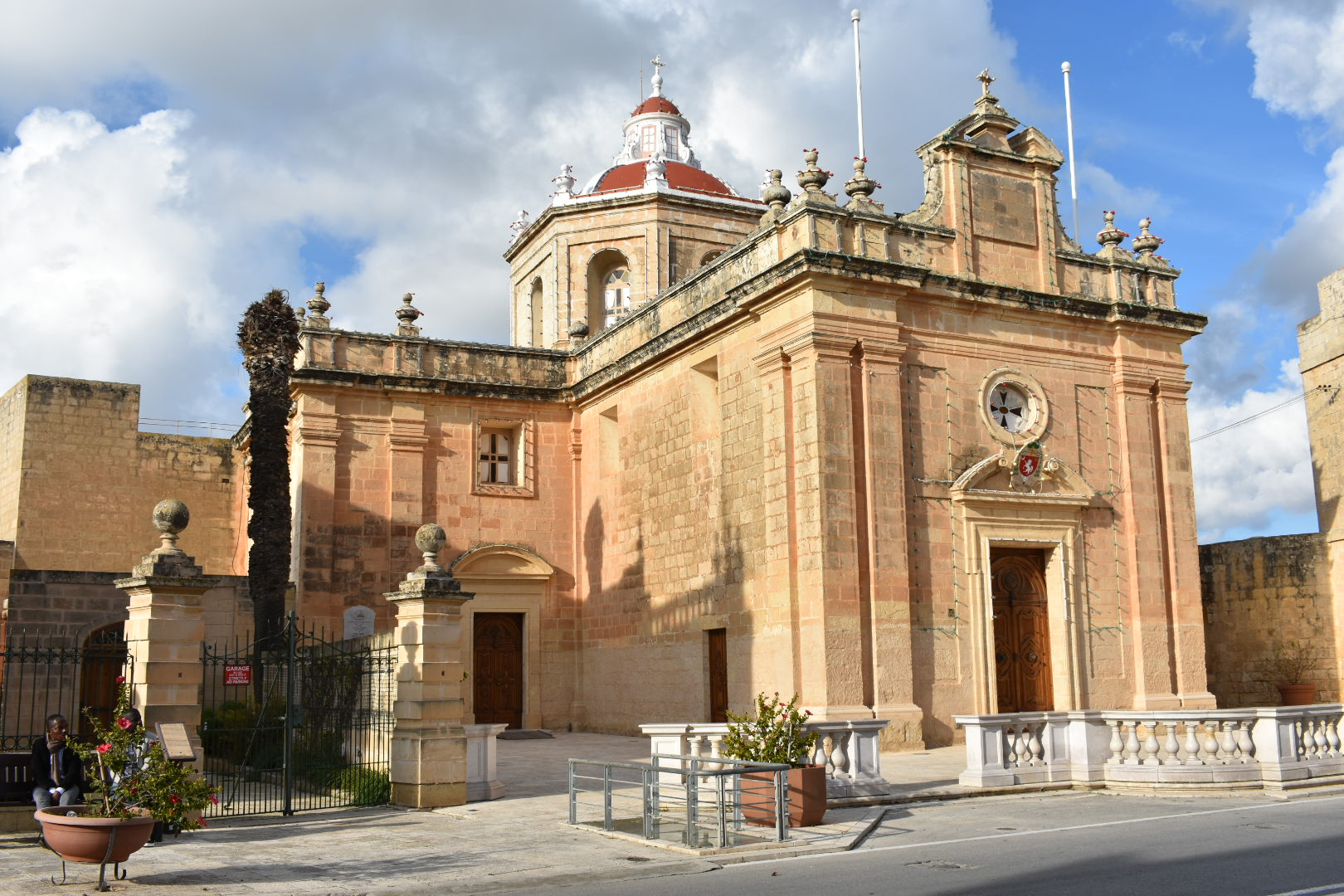
- St Paul's Church
- 35°50′01.9″N 14°29′01.0″E
- Location: Safi, Malta
- Denomination: Roman Catholic

History
- Status: Active
- Dedication: Conversion of Paul the Apostle
- Consecrated: 10 October 1784

Architecture
- Functional status: Parish church
- Architectural type: Church
- Style: Baroque; Doric
- Groundbreaking: 1727
- Completed: 1744

Specifications
- Materials: Limestone

Administration
- Archdiocese: Malta
- Parish: Safi

St Paul's Church, formally known as The Parish Church of the Conversion of Saint Paul, is a Roman Catholic parish church located in the village of Safi in Malta.

== The Parish ==
Before Safi became an independent parish in 1598, it formed part of the medieval parish of Bir Miftuħ, which is nowadays part of the parish of Gudja. The parish of St Mary of Bir Miftuħ is one of the original medieval parishes that are mentioned by Bishop Senatore de Mello in 1436. In 1592, the villages of Safi, Mqabba, and Kirkop were merged into a single parish, with St Leonard in Kirkop becoming the parish church. On April 13, 1598, Safi became an independent parish.

== The church ==
The original church of St Paul was much smaller than the present building. It was chosen from among five of the churches in the village to serve as the parish church. The present Baroque church, which is in the doric style, was built on the site of the original one between 1727 and 1744. It was consecrated on October 10, 1784.

== Interior ==
The church has a number of paintings. Among these are the titular painting, by Stefano Erardi, which is located behind the high altar and depicts the conversion of St Paul.
