= Punic-Roman towers in Malta =

Six ancient defensive structures

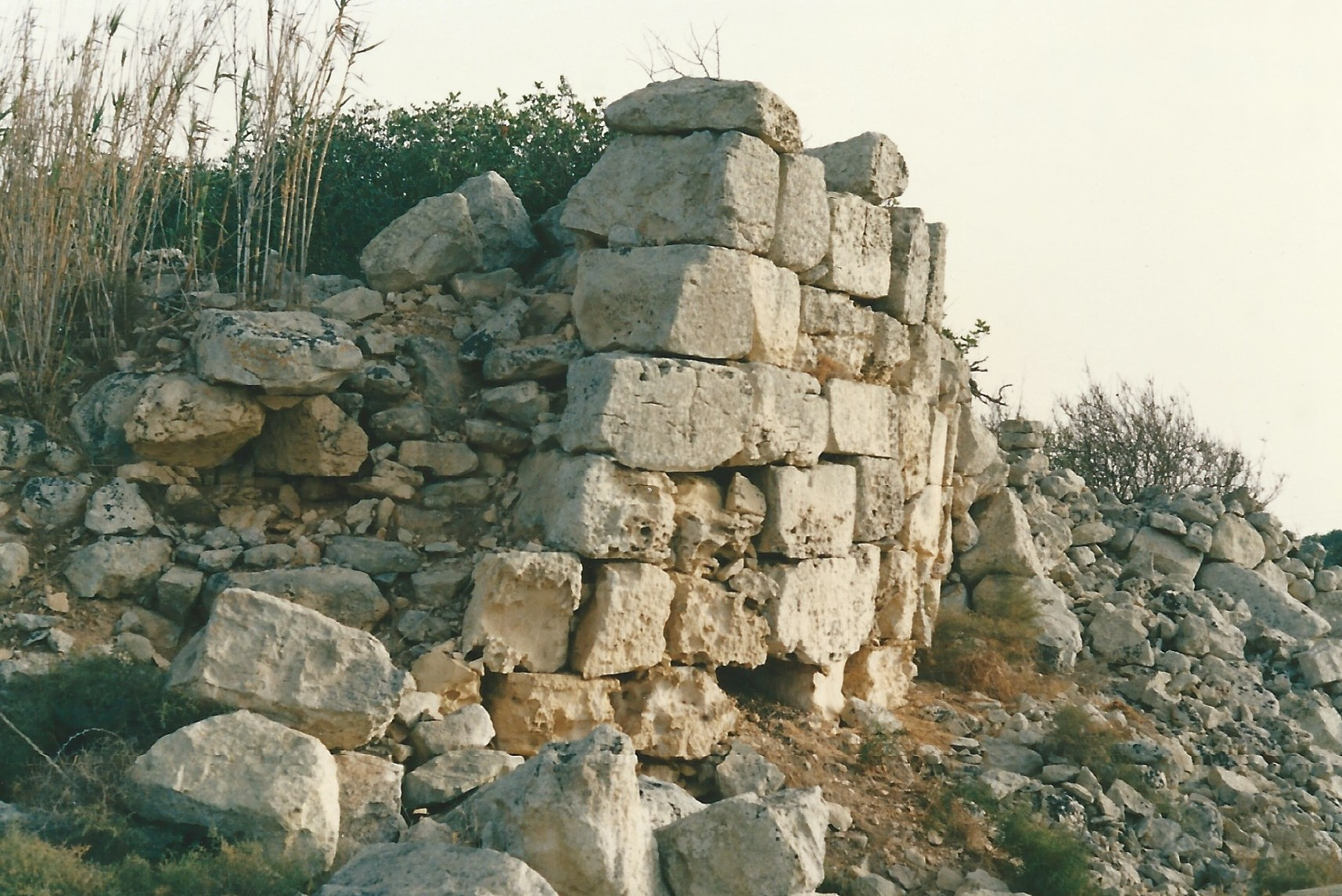
Remains of Ta' Ġawhar Tower in Safi

The remains of six Punic-Roman towers have been identified in Malta. They are believed to have been built while the island was part of the Punic or Roman Empires. Their architecture suggests a late Punic origin, and they remained in use throughout the Roman period, until at least the 3rd century AD. Evidence suggests that the towers were used to defend the island. The towers are clearly all built on high grounds, in specific locations, and could considerably communicate with signals from one to another. Similar towers are also found in nearby Tunisia with the same defensive system. In the context of time some locals still lived in caves with few others living in vernacular housing with similar characteristics to nearby Sicily.

The towers are generally held to be built during the Punic era and embellished by the Romans. Roman and Greek housing were constructed much later and generally not in the proximity to the towers which suggests that by the time the towers may have decreased their importance with the use of other military system such as the fortifications of Melite. However the last time when the towers were burned, to send signals, was in the third century AD. Some towers, such as Ta' Ċieda Tower, were primarily built with the adaptive reuse of pre-historic stones and after the destruction of the towers, when they were not rebuilt again, the ruins were used for funerary tombstones and rubble walls during the Arab period. The bottom base of six towers still survive, at varying extant, while some objects found at the towers are now displayed in museums. Two others were probably completely demolished during the building of the runway of the Malta International Airport.

== List of towers ==
Six sites, all on the main island of Malta, have been identified as being the remains of towers built either in the Punic or Roman periods. These are:

Name	Location	Status	Coordinates
Għajn Klieb Tower	Rabat		35°53′10.6″N 14°23′3.3″E
Tal-Baqqari Tower (also spelt tal-Bakkari)	Żurrieq		35°49′10.1″N 14°29′46.2″E
Ta' Ċieda Tower	San Ġwann	One third of base remains	35°54′26.6″N 14°28′48.1″E
Ta' Ġawhar Tower (also known as Ta’ Hlantun	Safi	Remains up to seven courses high	35°49′57.8″N 14°29′58.2″E
Tas-Santi Tower	Rabat	Some masonry blocks remain	35°53′50.3″N 14°21′26.6″E
Ta' Wilġa Tower (also known as tat-Torrijiet)	Mqabba	Part of base remains	35°50′59.2″N 14°27′34.5″E

In addition, archaeologist David Trump mentioned a further two towers, bringing the total to eight. The remains of some other towers might have been demolished to make way for the runway of the Malta International Airport.

No Roman towers have been identified on Malta's sister island Gozo, but some archaeological finds on the island are sometimes believed to be the remains of towers. However, the ruins are not sufficient to determine if they were actually Punic or Roman towers, and almost nothing is known about them.

Another Punic tower is found in the garden of the house of the parish priest of Żurrieq. It is 5.5 m (18 ft) high, and it is in relatively good condition. Unlike the other towers, this has a square shape, and it is believed to have been part of a larger building.

== Architecture, age and purpose ==
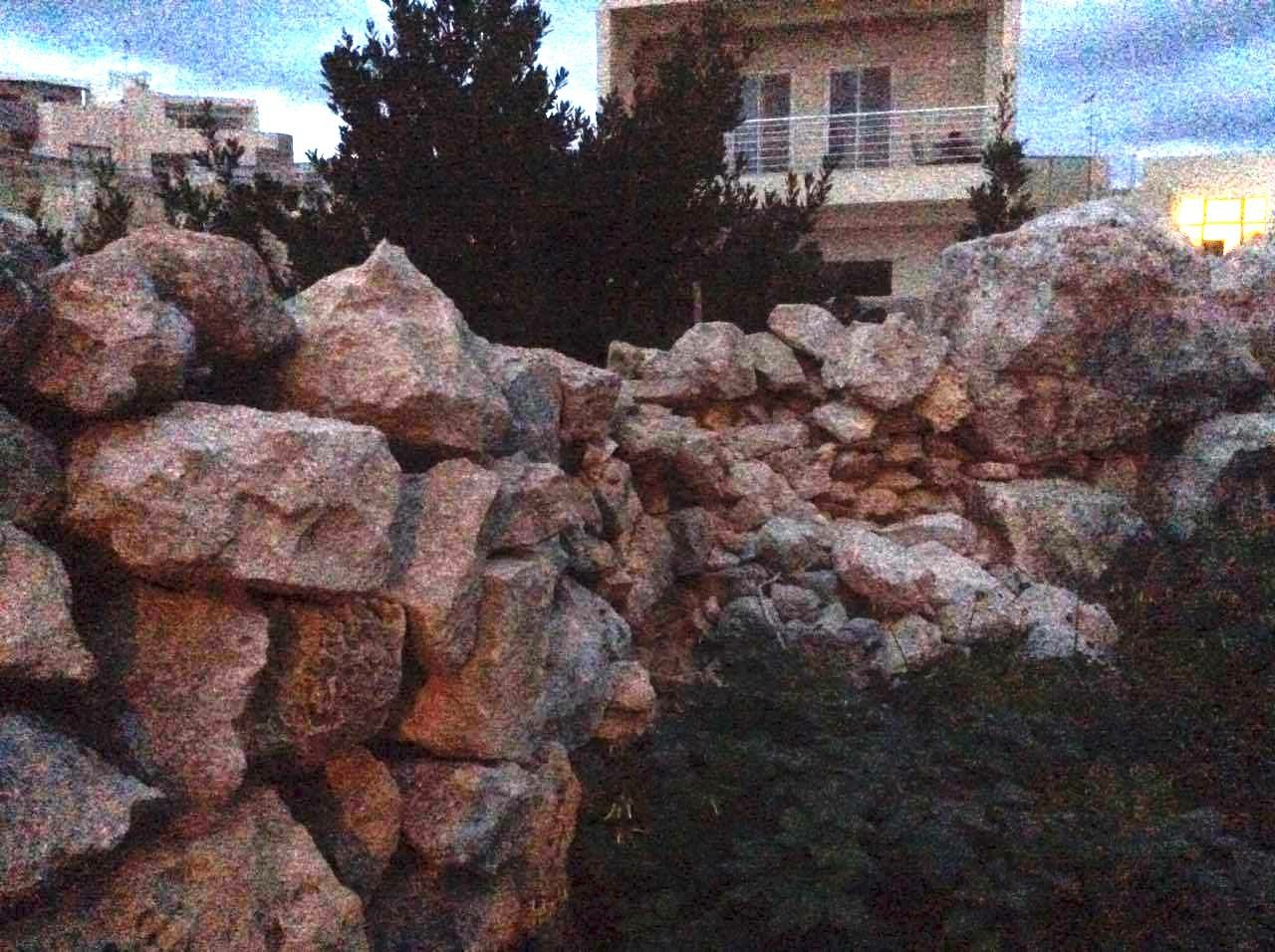
Remains of the base of Ta' Ċieda Tower in San Ġwann

All six towers have a round shape, and were built out of large ashlar blocks, typical of late Punic buildings. Ancient cisterns have been found at the towers of Ta' Ġawhar and Ta' Ċieda.

The age and purpose of the towers is not exactly known. Although some theories suggest that the towers are prehistoric, it is generally believed that they date back to the late Punic period, as evidenced by their architecture as well as by pottery and other artefacts uncovered at Ta' Wilġa and Ta' Ġawhar. A Phoenician tomb was also found close to Ta' Wilġa Tower. Ta' Ġawhar Tower is believed to have been burnt twice, initially during the First Punic War and again in around the 3rd century AD. Coins dating back to 35 BC and the 3rd century AD have been found at Ta' Ġawhar, along with an iron ace and a gold earring. This shows that the towers were definitely in use during the Roman period. Several theories have been suggested as to the purpose of the towers:

- According to Professor A. Bonanno, the towers might have been built by the Carthaginians in the 3rd century BC, to defend the island from a Roman attack during the Punic Wars.
- They might have been built to warn the garrison of the city of Melita of an approaching enemy, but some disagree saying that their locations do not make sense in defensive systems.
- They might have been located in hamlets, surrounding and defending a large settlement in the Żurrieq-Safi area.
- They might have been built near villas to guard olive estates, but no remains of villas have been found in the vicinity of any of the towers.
- At one point there were over thirty Roman villas in rural areas of which most remains were for most of them demolished for modern housing while others lie abandoned, buried and some have limited remains.
- They might have been built to protect Malta from an attack by the Heruli people.

The towers are believed to have been abandoned in around the 3rd century AD.

== Archaeology ==
Ta' Wilġa Tower was excavated by the Museums Department in 1910. Tal-Baqqari Tower was identified on 6 September 1920, but was never properly excavated. Ta' Ġawhar and Ta' Ċieda Towers were investigated by British archaeologist David Trump in 1960.

Ta' Wilġa and Ta' Ċieda towers were included on the Antiquities List of 1925.

The best preserved of the six towers is Ta' Ġawhar Tower, parts of which have survived up to seven courses. This tower is listed on the National Inventory of the Cultural Property of the Maltese Islands.

== Other towers with possible Roman origins ==
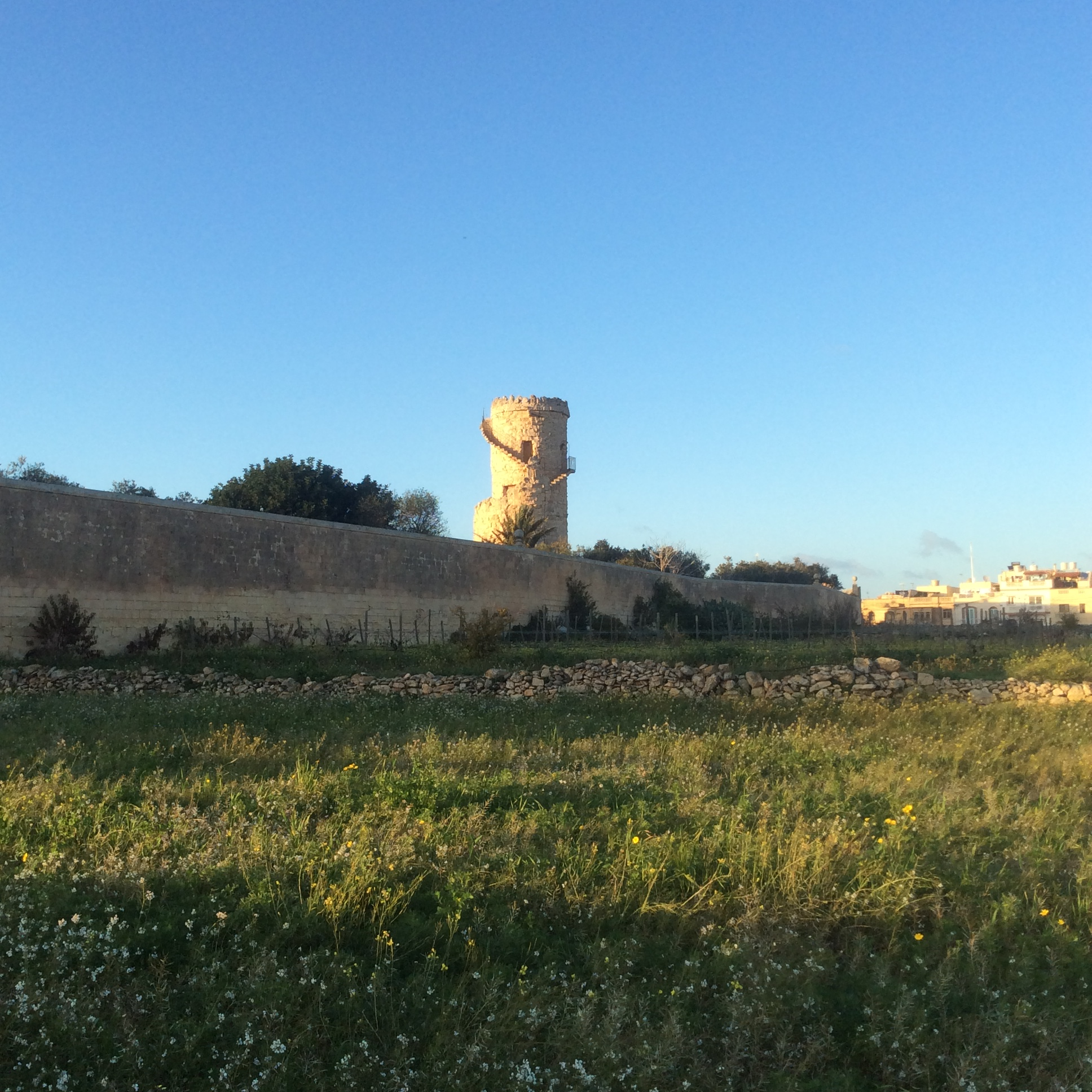
Xlejli Tower, which might have Roman origins

The Xlejli Tower in Gudja, which is still in good condition, also possibly has Roman origins. According to historian Louis de Boisgelin, an urn full of Roman copper medals was found at the tower, and its round shape makes it similar to other Roman towers in Malta. However, according to other sources, the tower was built in the 12th or 13th century AD.
