= Zurrieq dialect =

Dialect of Maltese

Żurrieq dialect
- Żurrieqi
- Region: Żurrieq
- Language family: Afro-Asiatic: Semitic; West Semitic; Central Semitic; Arabic; Maghrebi Arabic; Pre-Hilalian; Sicilian Arabic; Maltese; Żurrieq dialect
- Writing system: Maltese alphabet

Language codes
- ISO 639-3: –
- Glottolog: zurr1238
- Żurrieq in Malta

Żurrieqi is one of the dialects of the Maltese language. It is spoken in Żurrieq, a town in the Southern Region of Malta.

== Differences ==
Żurrieqi differs from Standard Maltese in lexicon, grammar and pronunciation. For example, in Standard Maltese "he is not working" is translated as mhux qed jaħdem, but in the Żurrieq dialect one says ma qedx jaħdem instead.

== Example ==
Żurrieqi	IPA transcription
Il-lanza tagħmel il-lanza tagħmel ġebla teħt, u n-nassa turbutha fursi skunt fej’ tkun trid turbutha b’erbat eqjem b’ħamse, b’sitta. U mbagħad ikillha biċċa sufra ‘il fuq min-nassa, iżżummha dik. Is-sufra qatta jgħidulha. Imbagħad il-lanza tista’ tirħiha. Le, bex iżżumm, bex ma tinżilx mal-qegħ in-nassa.	ɪlˈlɐntsɐ ˈtɐːmɛl ɪlˈlɐntsɐ ˈtɐːmɛl ˈʤɛblɛ tɛht ʊn ˈnɐssɐ tʊrˈbʊtɐ ˈfʊrsɪ skʊnt fɛj tkʊn trɪt tʊrˈbʊtɐ bɛrˈbɐt ɛʔˈjɛm ˈbhɐmsɛ ˈbsɪttɛ ʊmˈbɐt ɪˈkɪllɐ ˈbɪʧʧɐ ˈsʊːfrɐ ɪl fʊʔ mɪnˈnɐssɐ ɪzˈzʊmmɐ dɛjk ɪsˈsʊːfrɐ ˈʔɐttɐ jɐjˈduːlɐ ɪmˈbɐt ɪlˈlɐntsɐ ˈtɪstɐ tɪrˈhiːjɐ lɛ bɛʃ ˈɪzzʊmm bɛʃ mɐ tɪnˈzɪlʃ mɐl ʔɛːh ɪnˈnɐssɐ
