= Ta' Ġawhar Tower =

- It-Torri ta' Ġawhar (Maltese)
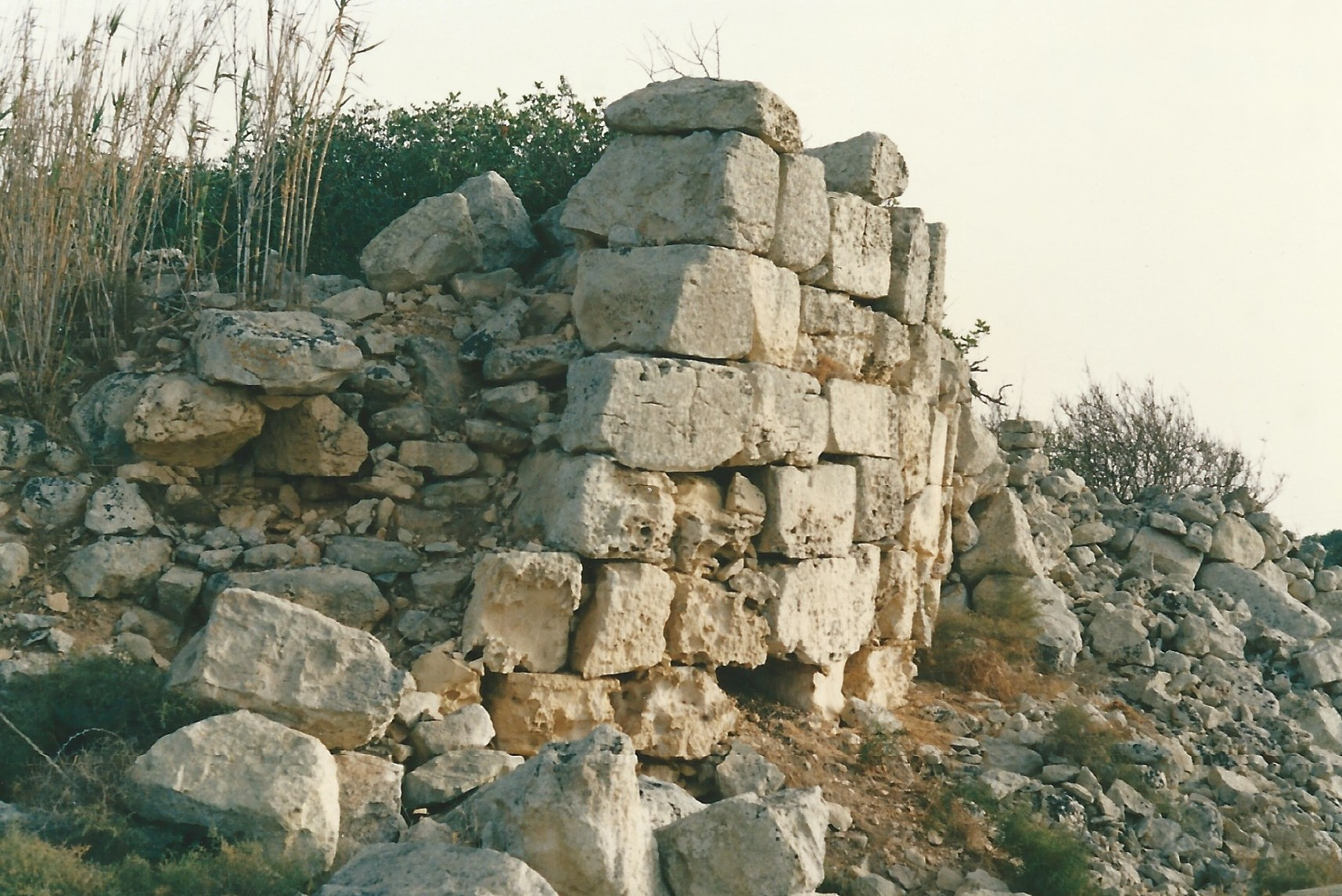
- The remains of Ta' Ġawhar Tower
- Interactive map of Ta' Ġawhar Tower
- 35°49′57.8″N 14°29′58.2″E
- Type: Tower
- Location: Safi, Malta
- Part of: Punic-Roman towers in Malta

History
- Built: 3rd century BC
- Built by: Phoenicians or Carthaginians or Romans
- Abandoned: Yes

Site notes
- Material: Upper Coralline Limestone
- Excavation dates: 1960s
- Archaeologists: David Trump
- Condition: Seven courses of the bottom base and ruins
- Owner: Government of Malta
- Management: Safi Local Council
- Public access: Yes

Ta' Ġawhar Tower is a round Punic-Roman tower in the village of Safi, Malta. The tower is the best preserved of the six Punic-Roman towers in Malta at approximately seven wall courses high. The tower was probably built at the time of the Punic Wars, although it continued in use during the Roman period before its destruction in the 3rd century AD.

== Description ==
Six round towers survive in various degrees of preservation on the main island of Malta. Thought likely to be of Punic construction, they appear to have been built in response to the period of unrest associated with the Punic Wars in the 3rd and 2nd centuries BC.

The remains of Ta' Ġawhar Tower consist of the lower seven courses of the tower. It is built up of large ashlar blocks, typical of Punic architecture. The walls at the foundation level are 3 metres thick, and the tower has an overall diameter of 14 to 16 metres. The tower also has a rectangular cistern attached to it.

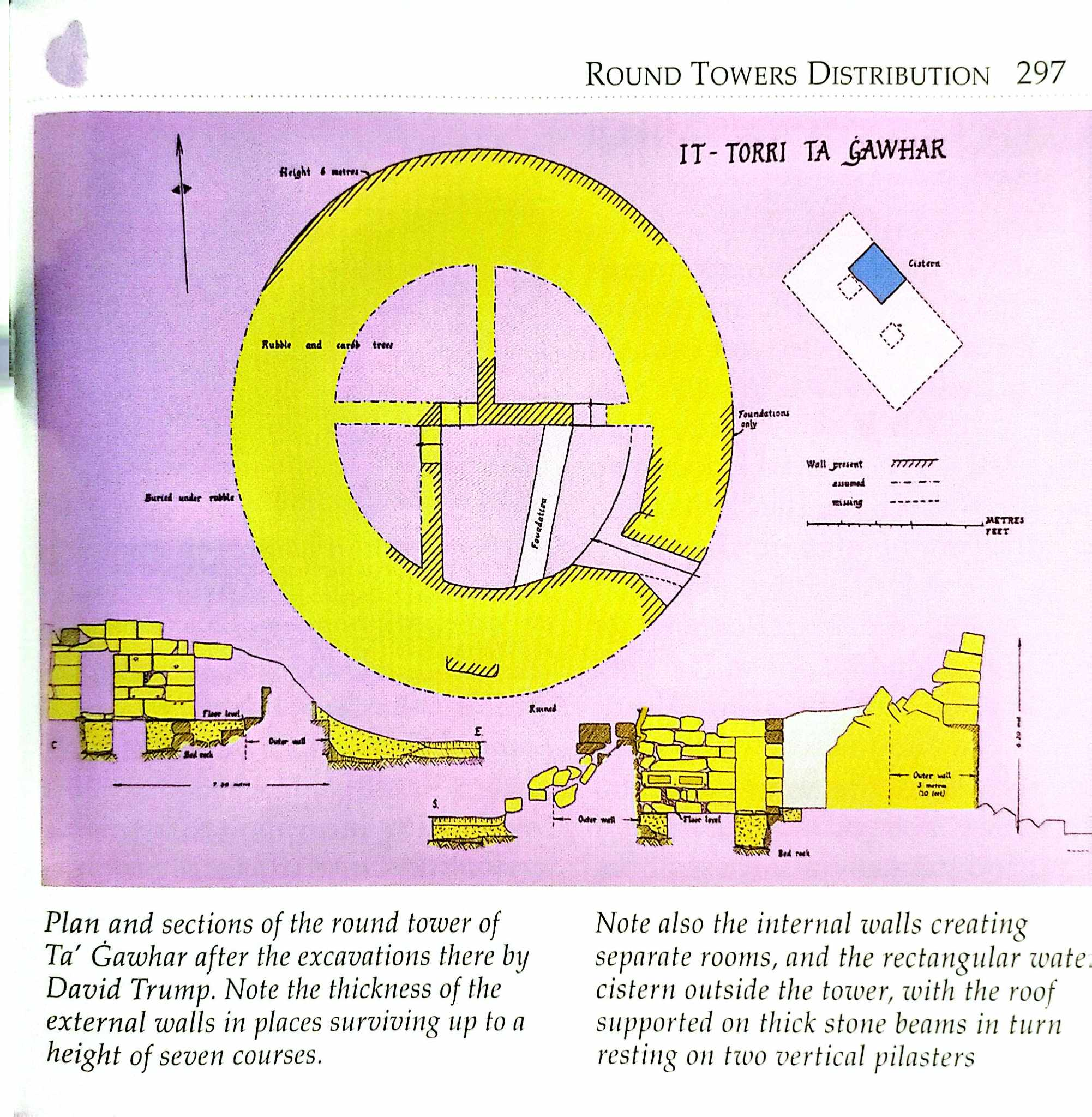
Plan and sections of the round tower of Ta' Ġawhar Tower after excavations by David Trump

The Ta' Ġawhar Tower was excavated by archaeologist David Trump in the 1960s. Finds included two bronze buckets, a double-bladed axe head, a gold wire earring, and a carbonised bread roll buried following the burning of the building. Two coins were found: one was minted in Malta dated to 35 BC with the legend of Arruntanus Balbus, and the other was a coin of the 3rd century AD representing the Roman emperor Claudius II Gothicus. Trump dated the destruction of the tower towards the end of the 3rd century AD, and suggested an association with the invasion of the Heruli in 269. The tower is scheduled as grade 1 national monument by the Malta Environment and Planning Authority and is also listed on the National Inventory of the Cultural Property of the Maltese Islands.

== See also ==
- Punic-Roman towers in Malta
- Ta' Ċieda Tower
