= Punic building, Żurrieq =

Unidentified Punic building in Żurrieq, Malta

Punic building
- Punic Tower, Żurrieq Tower
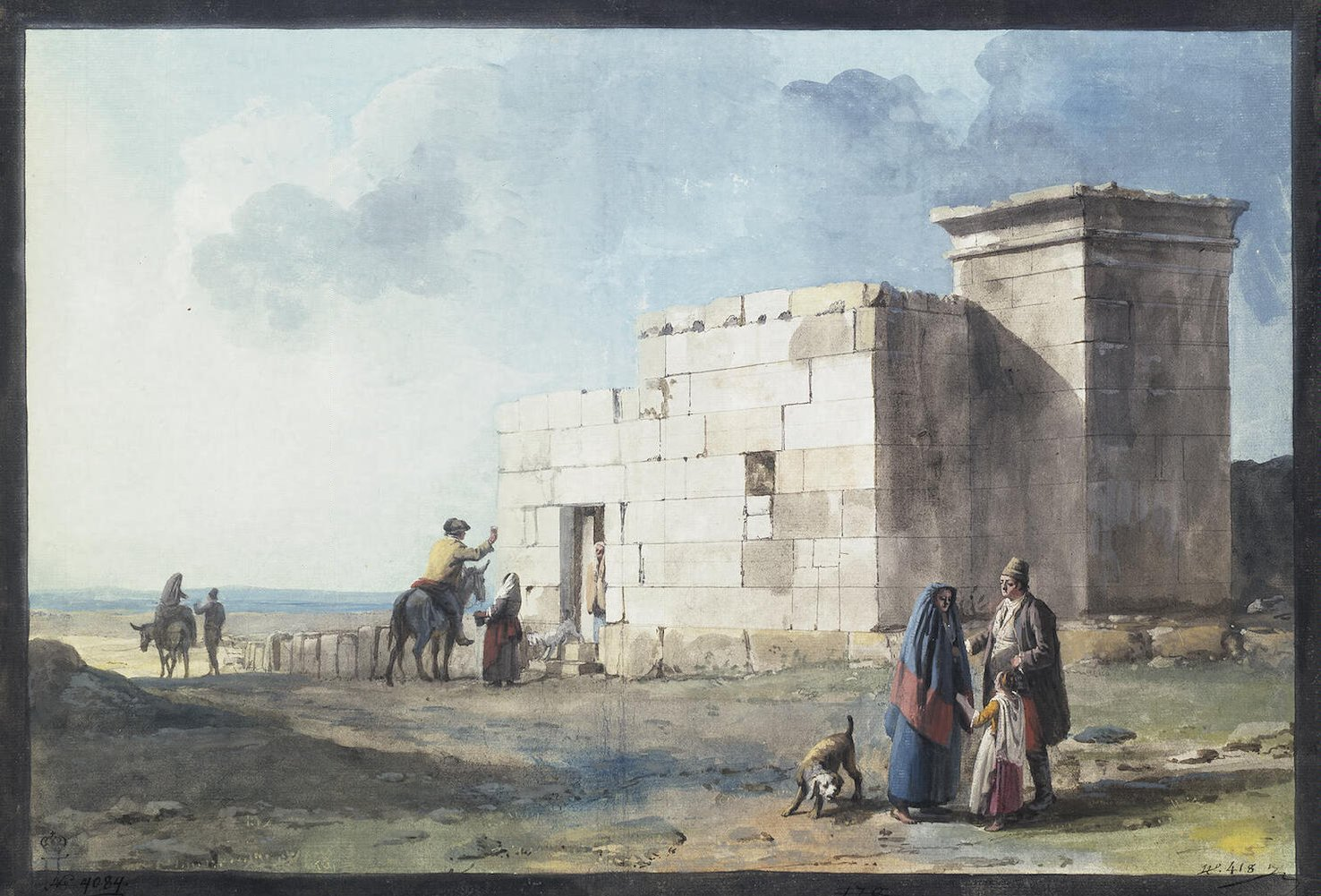
- The Punic building with tower as painted by Jean-Pierre Houël around 1770s

- Location within Malta
- 35°49′48.7″N 14°28′32.9″E
- Periods: Phoenician/Punic
- Location: Żurrieq, Malta

History
- Built: c. 6th century BC

Site notes
- Material: Limestone
- Excavation dates: 1938, 1964
- Archaeologists: R. V. Galea, Charles Zammit
- Condition: Partially intact
- Public access: By appointment

The remains of an unidentified Punic building exist incorporated into several properties in Żurrieq, Malta. They include a well-preserved structure commonly known as the Punic Tower or the Żurrieq Tower which is found inside the private garden of the Domus Curialis, the house of the town's archpriest, and which is the most substantial surviving example of Punic architecture on the island.

== Description ==
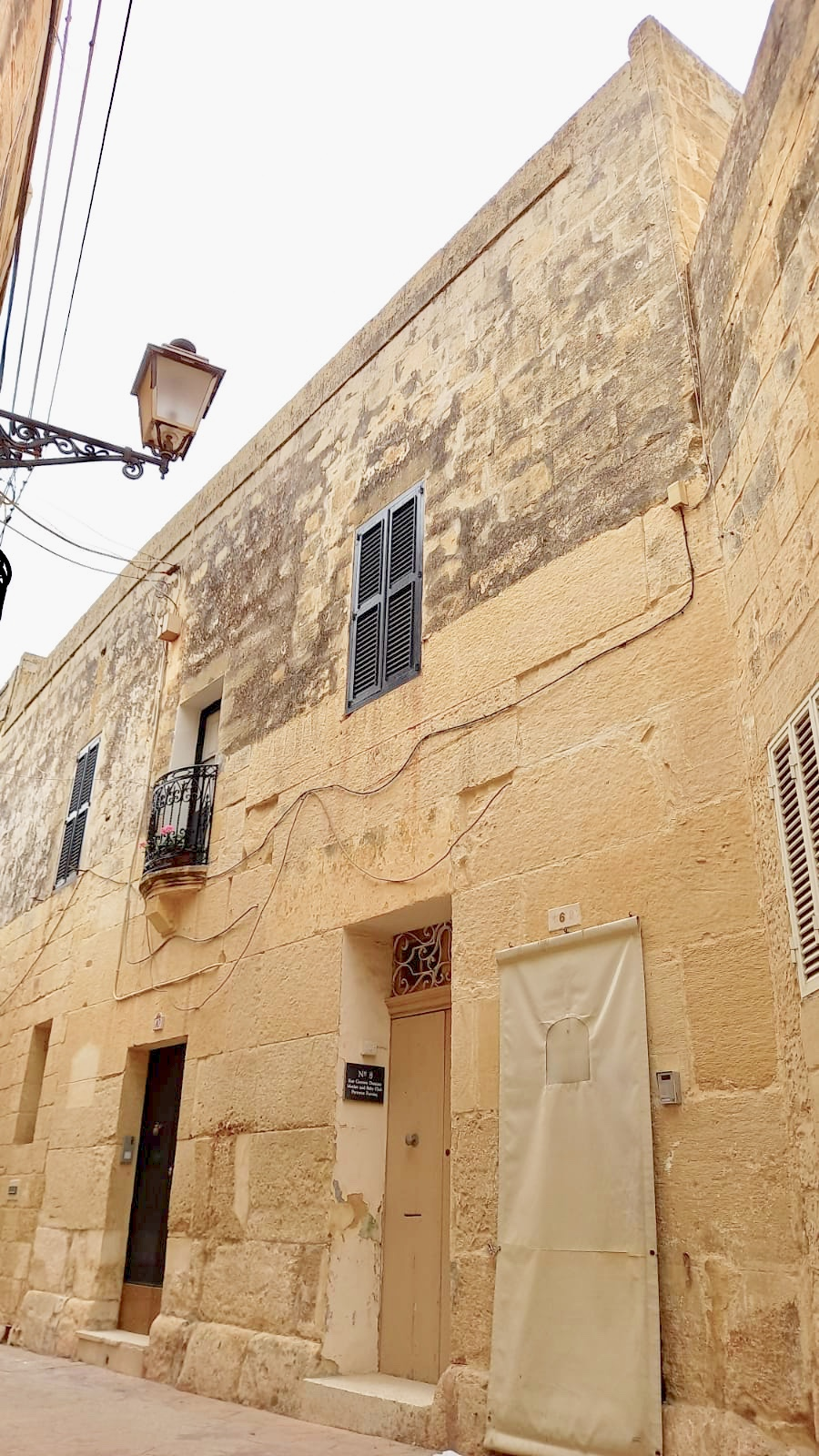
Houses in Carmel Street incorporating remains of the Punic building (note the larger size masonry)

The site consists of a well-preserved 5.6 m (18 ft)-high tower with a square plan topped by a cavetto cornice showing inspiration from ancient Egyptian architecture, along with some adjacent walls which are believed to have originally formed part of a larger building. Both the tower and the walls are constructed out of ashlar limestone masonry without mortar, with each block having dimensions of up to 66 cm × 180 cm (26 in × 71 in).

The building's age and purpose are not known, but it might date back to around the late 6th century BC. The tower's architecture suggests that it formed part of a prominent building, and it has been speculated that it could have been a temple, possibly that of Melqart which was mentioned by Ptolemy. It might have also been a country house or a monumental tomb. The building is not believed to have been a defensive tower, and it has a different typology from other Punic-Roman towers whose remains have been found in Malta.

== History ==
The building's existence was first recorded by Bishop Miguel Jerónimo de Molina in 1680. Believing that the ruins were of Greek origin, Jean-Pierre Houël visited the site around the 1770s and produced paintings and plans of it which were included in his 1785 work Voyage Pittoresque de Sicile, Malte et Lipari. Houël's illustrations document the ruins while they were freestanding, prior to their incorporation into later buildings.

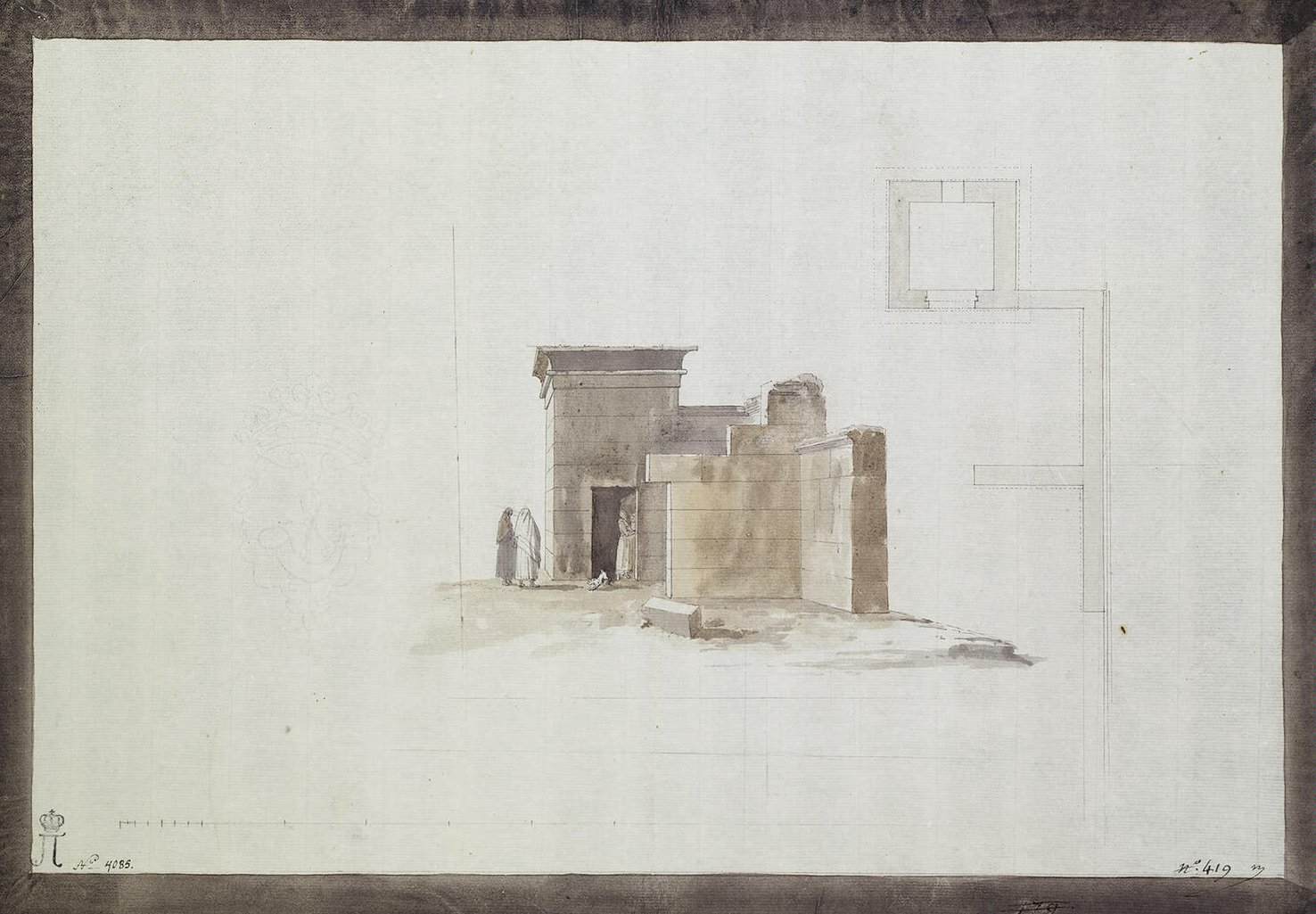
The other side of the building as drawn in the 1770s

In his 1882 Report on the Phœnician and Roman Antiquities in the group of the islands of Malta, Antonio Annetto Caruana referred to the building as "an old Greek house." By that time, the remains had been incorporated into the house of the parish priest of Żurrieq, and the tower was "in complete preservation" while the adjacent walls' cornice which had been depicted by Houël no longer existed. Today the remains of the building still survive within the priest's residence (known as the Domus Curialis) and in adjacent properties at nos. 134–138, Carmel Street (Maltese: Triq il-Karmnu), with the tower being located within the archpriest's private garden.

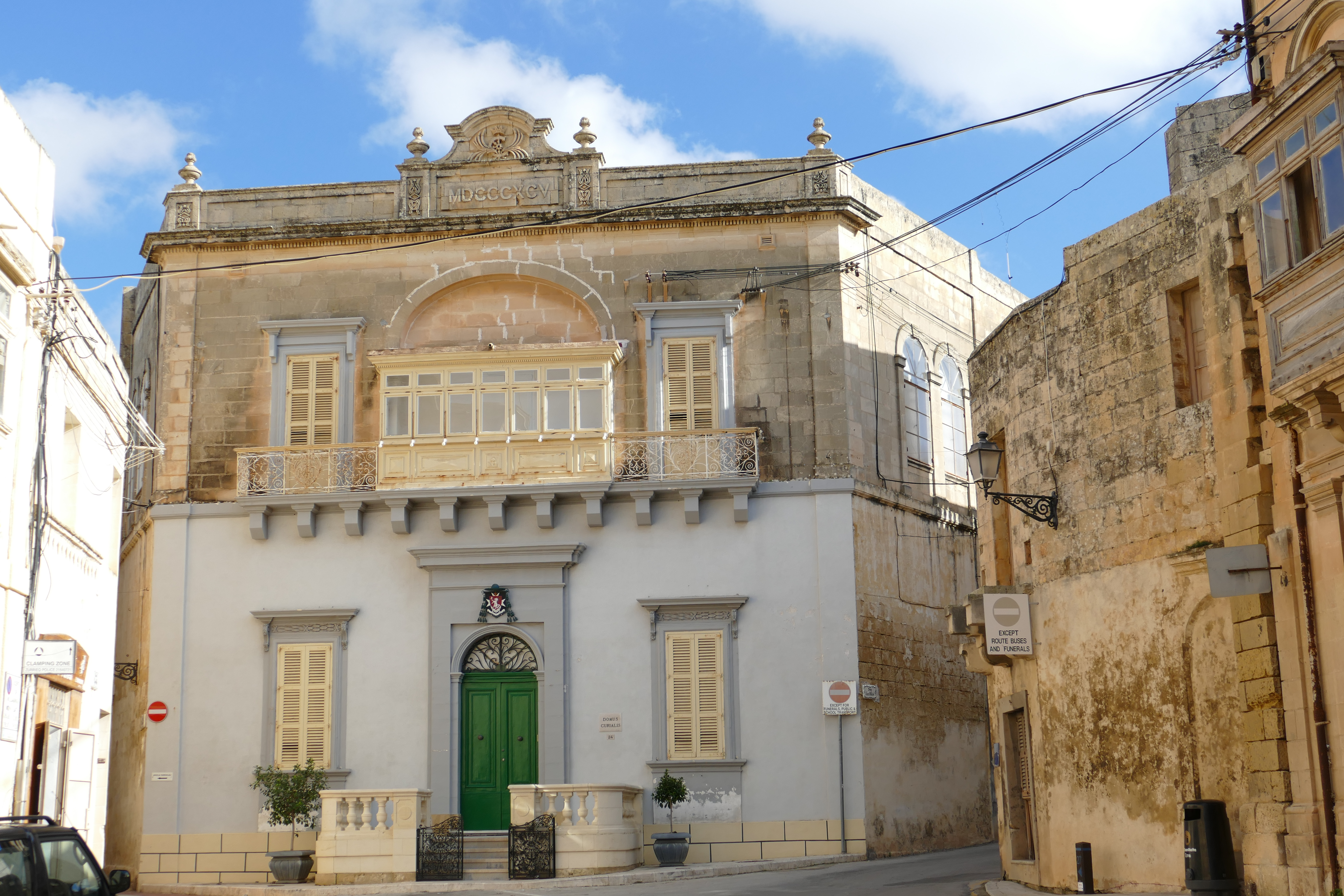
The Domus Curialis

The building was noted by archaeologists Albert Mayr in 1909 and Thomas Ashby in 1915, with the latter identifying it as "the remains of a pre-Roman building, probably a country house of the Phoenician period." The first archaeological investigation of the site was carried out on 13 June 1938 by R. V. Galea and Charles Zammit of the Archaeological Section of the Museum, who were accompanied by Dun Ġwann Farrugia, a priest from Żejtun. They determined that most of the remains depicted by Houël still existed despite some alterations, and they identified a nearby cellar which might have been the quarry from where the limestone used to construct the building was extracted.

Further excavations were carried out in 1964 in an attempt to date the tower, and they revealed the building's foundations and found pottery ranging from the Punic to the modern periods. This matched the building's attribution to the Phoenician/Punic period but it did not conclusively prove it. The structural technique used in the tower's cornice is typical of Punic architecture.

The remains of the building, especially the well-preserved tower, are regarded as "the most outstanding surviving structure of the Punic period" within the Maltese Islands. The Planning Authority scheduled the remains as a Class A archaeological site on 17 April 1998, while the Domus Curialis and the adjacent buildings into which the Punic structure has been incorporated were scheduled as Grade 2 properties. The tower is not normally open to the public and it can only be accessed by appointment.

== See also ==
- Punic-Roman towers in Malta
