= Safi, Malta =

Safi Ħal Safi
- Local council
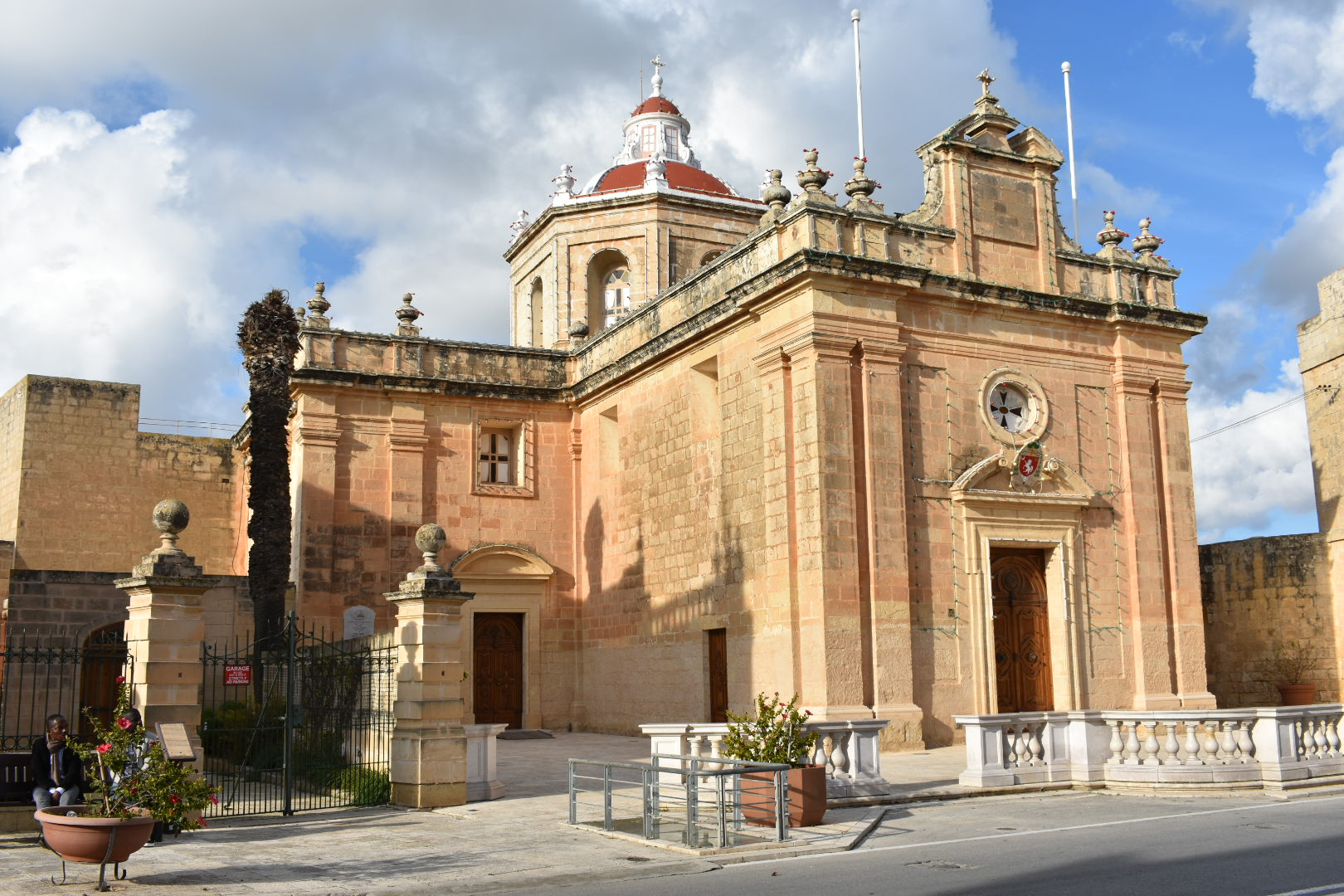
- Safi Parish Church

- Flag Coat of arms
- Motto: Sine Macula
- Coordinates: 35°50′0″N 14°29′6″E
- Country: Malta
- Region: Western Region
- District: South Eastern District
- Borders: Żurrieq, Kirkop, Luqa

Government
  - Mayor: Johan Mula (PL)

Area
  - Total: 2.3 km^{2} (0.89 sq mi)

Population (Jul. 2024)
  - Total: 3,324
  - Density: 1,400/km^{2} (3,700/sq mi)
- Demonym(s): Ħalsafi (m), Ħalsafija (f), Ħalsafin (pl)
- Time zone: UTC+1 (CET)
  - Summer (DST): UTC+2 (CEST)
- Postal code: SFI
- Dialing code: 356
- ISO 3166 code: MT-47
- Patron saint: St. Paul
- Day of festa: last Sunday of August
- Website: Official website

Safi (Maltese: Ħal Safi) is a village in the Western Region of Malta, bordering Żurrieq and Kirkop. The population of Safi was 3,324 in July 2024. This included 1,714 males and 1,610 females; 2,985 Maltese nationals and 339 foreign nationals.

The formation of the village, as known today, goes back to the Punic-Roman period: the Ta' Ġawhar Tower, a round Punic-Roman tower in the village, was probably built at the time of the Punic Wars. The village of Ħal Safi is surrounded by four other major villages. Farmers and peasants used to interact on their way back home from work. After a niche was erected, people began to settle, a new village started to form and expanded over the years.

In 1417, the village was already recorded as being named Ħal Safi. According to 1419 records of the Standing Army (id-Dejma), between eighty and ninety people were considered as village residents. The job occupations of the period were based on primary economic functions, mainly rearing animals and agriculture.

The origin of the village's name is uncertain. Some historians believe that the name derived from the pure (Maltese: safi) air of the area, others insist it is due to its similarity to the City of Safi in Morocco, and others say the name came about since none of the residents were contaminated during an epidemic infection that hit vast zones in Malta. However, the most considered-reputable origin is that the village is named after a family with the surname Safi, as with numerous other Maltese Villages, especially those beginning with Ħal such as Attard, Balzan, Luqa, etc. The coat-of-arms, a horizontal light-blue stripe on a silver background, and the motto, Sine Macula, emphasize the meaning of the village.

== Declaration of the village as a parish ==
For several years Ħal Safi formed part of Bir Miftuħ. However, the residents were not happy with this, mostly because of the distance between the two villages. Instead they wished to at least form part of Żurrieq, which was much nearer. In 1575 when Monsignor Pietro Dusina visited Ħal Safi, the residents put their wish forward, but nothing came out of it.

At last, in 1592, Bishop Gargallo decided to separate Ħal Safi, Imqabba and Ħal Kirkop from Bir Miftuħ. He amalgamated the three villages into one Parish. Father Carl Taliana from Luqa was appointed as its Parish Priest. Ħal Safi residents were still not satisfied because they had to walk long distances when visiting the church dedicated to Saint James at Ħal Kirkop for the celebration of sacraments such as Holy Communion and Funerals.

When Ħal Safi residents got to know that a new church was going to be built at Ħal Kirkop, they were not keen on donating money for the project.

In 1598, a delegation of twelve men from Ħal Safi paid a visit to Bishop Gargallo. In the name of all Ħal Safi residents, they filed a petition requesting that the village of two hundred and ten residents become a Parish. This time the Bishop accepted their request. So, in April 1598, a contract to this effect was drawn up in front of Notary Debono.

According to the agreement, Ħal Safi residents had to pay the Parish Priest an annual sum of money, precisely on the feast of the Conversion of Saint Paul. The administration of this new Parish was assigned to Dun Gwann Mizzi. After three months, Dun Gwann Mizzi was appointed Parish Priest of Imqabba. Dun Mattew Xiriha was put in his stead on a temporary basis.

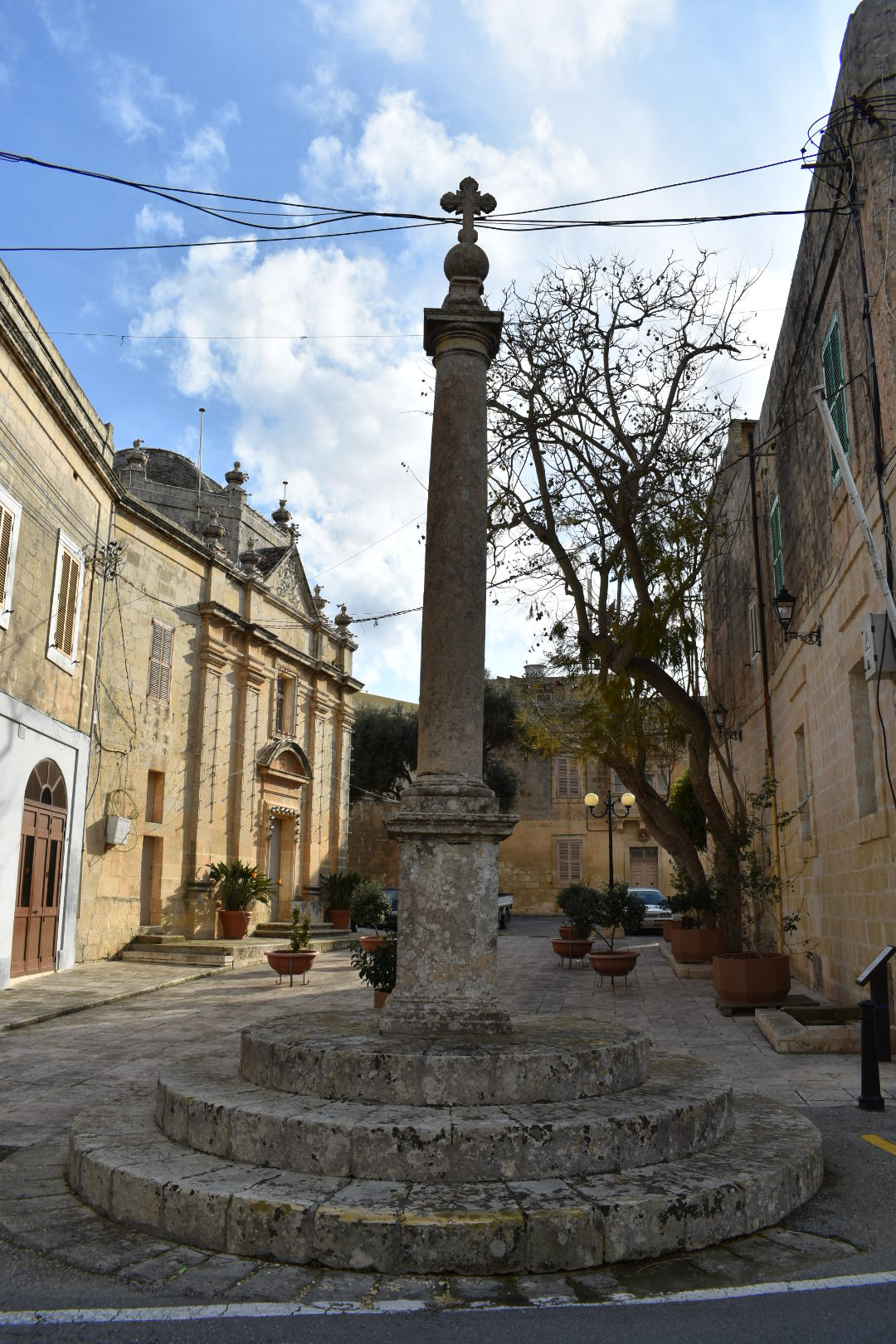
The Dejma cross, and the chapel of St Mary (left)

In those years, there were five chapels in Ħal Safi. The largest one, which was dedicated to Saint Paul, was chosen to serve as the Parish Church. As a commemoration of the foundation of the Parish, a church bell was bought. An image of Saint Peter and another one of Saint Paul together with the following inscription "Sancte Paule Ora Pro Nobis" were engraved in it. The other four chapels were dedicated to: St. Agatha, the Assumption of the Virgin Mary, and two to the Birth of the Virgin Mary. The only one still in existence is that dedicated to the Assumption of the Virgin Mary, which was re-built in 1761.

== Feast ==
Back in 1575, a small feast in honour of Saint Paul was already being celebrated in church. Then, in 1725, external celebrations were added on. A procession with the relic of St. Paul was first held in 1732. In 1840, a statue of St. Paul, sculptured in wood by Xandru Farrugia of Zejtun, was introduced and paraded during the procession. That year, feast celebrations were organised to their very best. These included ground fireworks, petards, band services and liturgical ceremonies. From that year onwards, band services became a fixed contribution and in 1874 a stage was constructed purposely for the band. Since feast celebrations were expanding year after year, a feast club (St. Paul's Club) was set up in 1929 to help with the feast's organization.

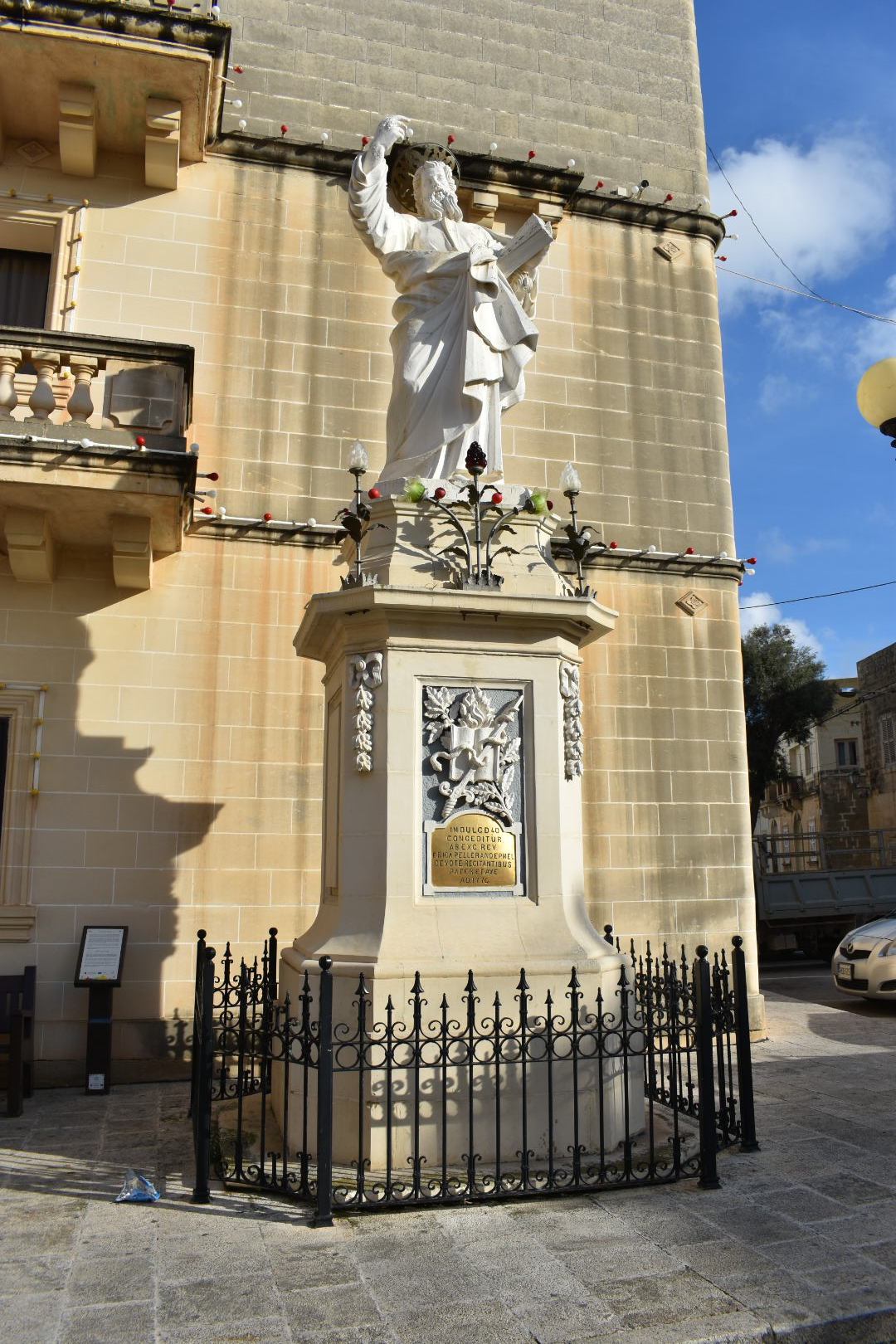
Another statue of St. Paul, in Safi, in front of the band club

Four outstanding feasts were celebrated in 1960, in 1984, in 1998 and in 2008. The first one commemorated the arrival of Saint Paul on our island; the one celebrated in 1984 commemorated the 200th anniversary of the Consegration of Ħal Safi Parish Church; the third one commemorated the 400th anniversary of Ħal Safi Parish, whilst the fourth commemorated "Is-Sena Pawlina". Pilgrimages, sermons, choir participation, band services and fireworks were organised to commemorate each anniversary.

Up till the year 1959, the feast in honour of St. Paul was held on 25 January. From 1960 onwards, mainly due to January's bad weather, this feast was diverted to the last Sunday of August .

In the year 1971, a new feast hymn was composed by Mro. A. Muscat Azzopardi to lyrics written by Paul Callus. Then in 1981, another hymn was written, this time by J. Zerafa and composed by Mro. E. Bugeja. A major hymn called "Is-Sejha", written by Paul Callus and composed by Mro. Ray Sciberras, came into being in 2002.

When Fr. Michael Agius took up office as Parish Priest, feast activities rapidly increased. On the initiative of Saint Paul's Club, two band marches were added to the programme - one on Friday evenings and another on Sunday mornings. Moreover, persons in charge of fireworks organized another band march on Sunday night, right after the procession. Likewise, decorations, such as lights and banners, in preparation for this religious feast were also increased especially in several roads and in the main square.

The day following the feast of Saint Paul is considered a holiday by all the residents. The majority of them go on the ‘xalata’ to Armier where they spend the day on the beach.

== Culture ==
In the past, the most common job occupied by Ħal Safi residents was in the agriculture sector. Others were soldiers employed by the Standing Army. Some others were sailors, builders, stonemasons, white-washers and quite a number of residents were street hawkers.

Soon after the Second World War, many farmers left their fields to join the government sector. Nowadays, the work force is vaster and includes employees in the government sector, private sector, dry docks, factories. In addition, one can find several self-employed persons and contractors. Lately, the trend has changed and the number of university qualified people is always increasing earning high-profile jobs such as doctors, lawyers, teachers, accountants and management personnel. Farming is now mostly done as part-time and to some extent more as a hobby than as a means of making a living.

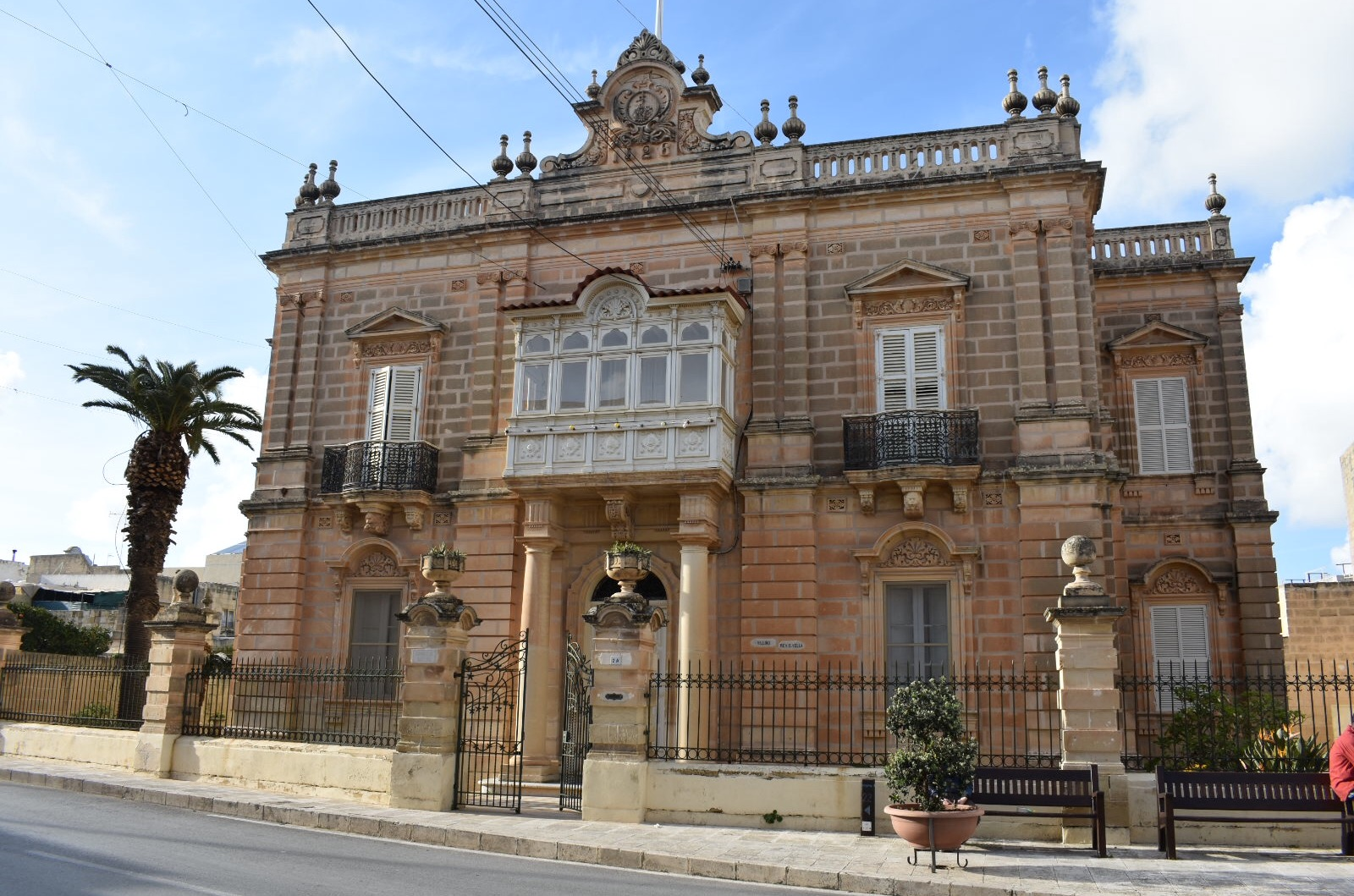
Early 20th-century Villa Dun Gwann, now a convent, was damaged during the war.

By the end of the Second World War, the street lanterns and the drinking fountains became obsolete, and instead, improved services such as electricity, sewage, postage mail, telecommunication, water and other services were introduced. In 1962, the construction of a new and modern school was initiated to replace the one situated in St. Paul's Street.

In the 80's a playing field adjacent to the school was inaugurated, later refurbished with synthetic turf in 2000. In 1986, a public health clinic started to operate in Saint George Street. Moreover, the number of houses and consequently the number of residents is always increasing. In fact, from latest statistics, the population of Ħal Safi has reached one thousand and eight hundred persons. Furthermore, the number of retail outlets multiplied in the last few years. The most two common surnames in the village are Busuttil and Zammit.

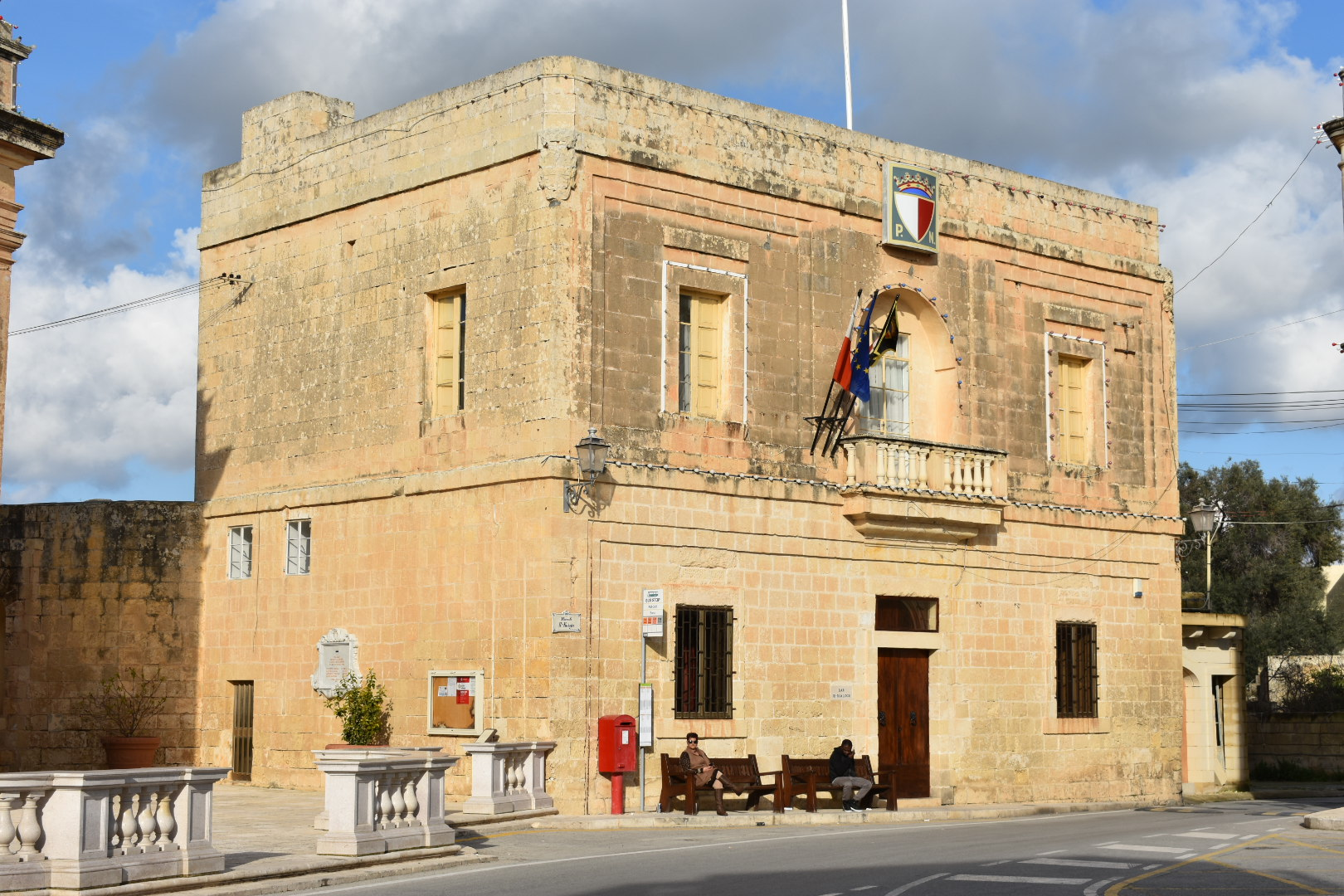
Dar id-Djalogu, built during the Order of St. John, with coat of arms defaced during the French occupation, and now a political club of the Nationalist Party

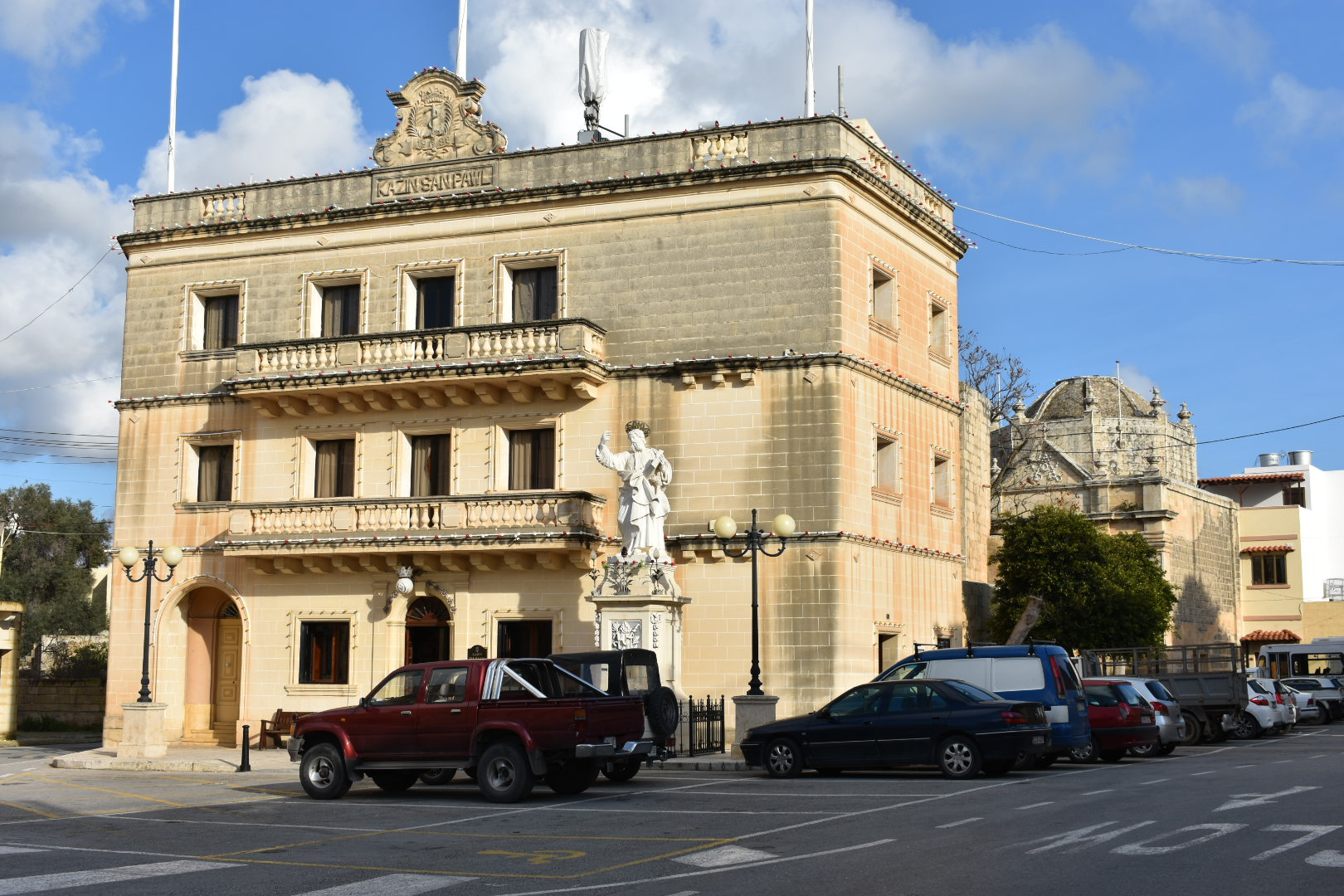
St Paul Band Club building

The climax of the social life is the celebration of the village festa, celebrated through the last week of August. The patron Saint of Ħal Safi is St. Paul. Like most villages, Ħal Safi residents had nobody representing them in central government. Since 1994, Ħal Safi has had its own Local Council which contributed in no small way to increasing the number of projects created for the benefit of Ħal Safi residents, prominently Neil Eric Zammit.

There are few social clubs which happen to be frequented by the locals in the early evening hours. Passing through Ħal Safi one can remark the lack of social activity where the empty tranquil roads are often associated to a Gozitan village. St. Paul's Band (L-Għaqda Mużikali San Pawl) was formed in 1989, and it falls under the auspices of St. Paul's Club, Ħal Safi.

== Zones in Ħal Safi ==
- Il-Għadir
- Misraħ Ħlantun
- Ta' Amparell
- Tal-Karwija
- Tal-Ibraġ
- Ta' Mnejqiet
- Ta' Sant' Agata
- Wara l-Ġnien

== Ħal Safi's roads ==
The village roads can be divided into two: the old ones, which formed part of the old village and the newly constructed ones. The older ones were all named after various saints, but the more recent ones were named using several other criteria. The main roads are:

- Misraħ San Ġużepp (St Joseph Square)
- Misraħ tal-Knisja (Church Square)
- Sqaq San Mikiel (St. Michael Alley)
- Sqaq San Pawl (St. Paul Alley)
- Triq Ananija (Ananias Road)
- Triq Dun Guzepp Caruana (Rev. Joseph Caruana Street)
- Triq Dun Karm Vella (Rev. Carmel Vella Street)
- Triq il-Biedja (Agriculture Street)
- Triq il-Kuccard (Honey Buzzard Road)
- Triq il-Kaccaturi (Hunters Road)
- Triq il-Kenn (Sheltered Road)
- Triq in-Nassaba (Trappers Road)
- Triq il-Palma (Palm Street)
- Triq is-Summien (Quail Street)
- Triq l-Iskola (School Street)
- Triq iż-Żurrieq (Żurrieq Road)
- Triq San Ġorġ (St. George Street)
- Triq San Ġwann (St. John Road)
- Triq San Pawl (St. Paul Street)
- Triq San Tumas (St. Thomas Street)
- Triq Santa Marija (St. Mary Street)
- Triq Salvu Cauchi
- Triq Ta' Gawhar (Ta' Gawhar Road)

== See also ==
- Safi, Morocco
- Alexander Ball
