= St Leonard's Church, Kirkop =

Parish Church of St Leonard
- Il-Knisja Parrokkjali ta San Leonardu
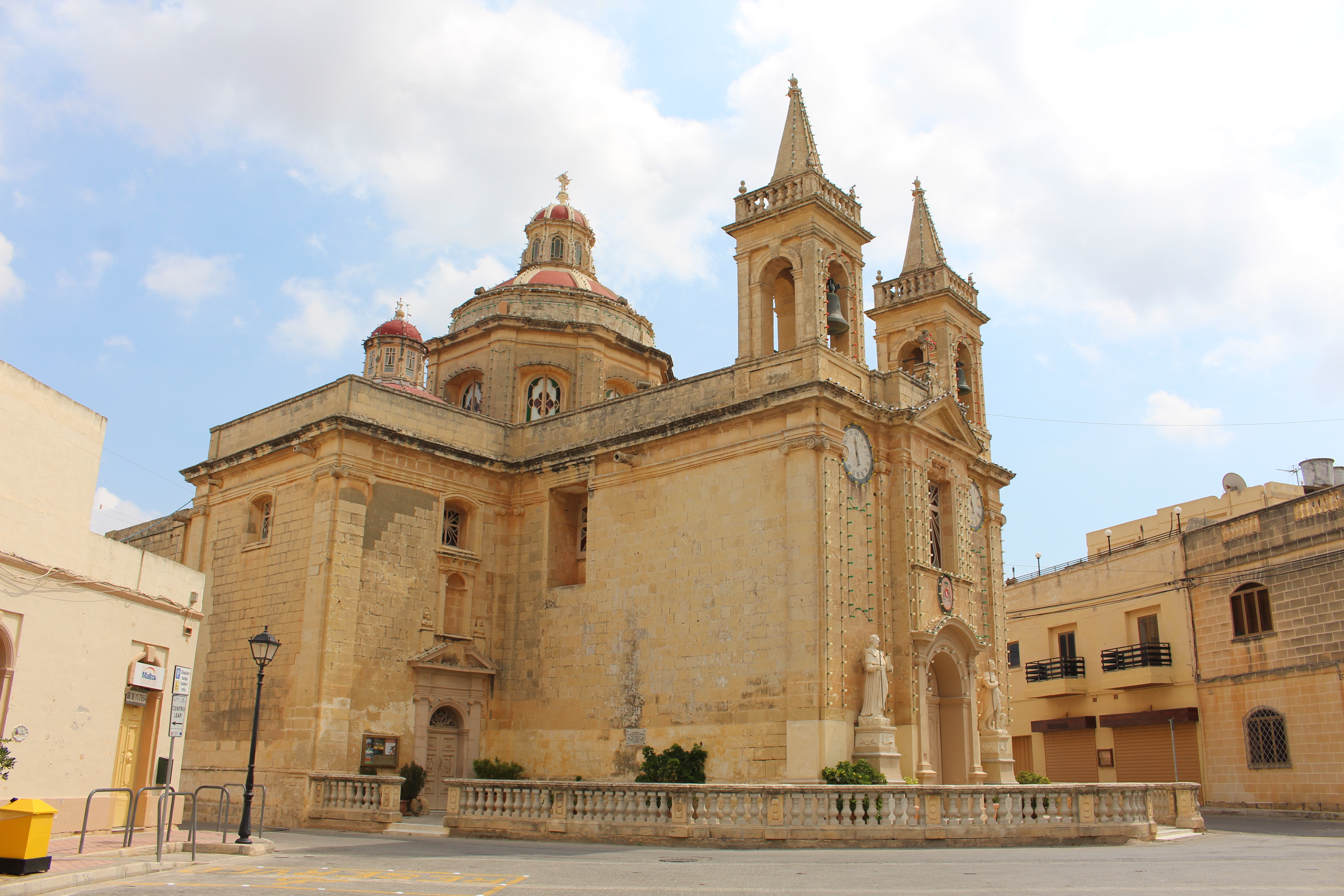
- Parish Church of St Leonard
- 35°50′32.2″N 14°29′09.1″E
- Location: Kirkop, Malta
- Denomination: Roman Catholic

History
- Status: Active
- Dedication: St Leonard of Noblac
- Consecrated: 10 November 1782

Architecture
- Functional status: Parish church
- Architectural type: Church
- Style: Baroque

Specifications
- Materials: Limestone

Administration
- Archdiocese: Malta
- Parish: Kirkop

Clergy
- Rector: Valentino Borg

The Parish Church of St Leonard is a Roman Catholic parish church serving the village of Kirkop in Malta.

== History ==
The church was built during the start of the 16th century. It became a parish church in 1592. Between 1706 and 1779 the church was enlarged to accommodate the growing population of the village. The church was dedicated and consecrated by the Bishop of Malta Vincenzo Labini on 10 November 1782. The church's two bell towers were built in 1800. The interior of the church was refurbished in 1878 by Reverend J. Barbara.
