= Żurrieq =

Żurrieq Iż-Żurrieq Zurrico
- Local council
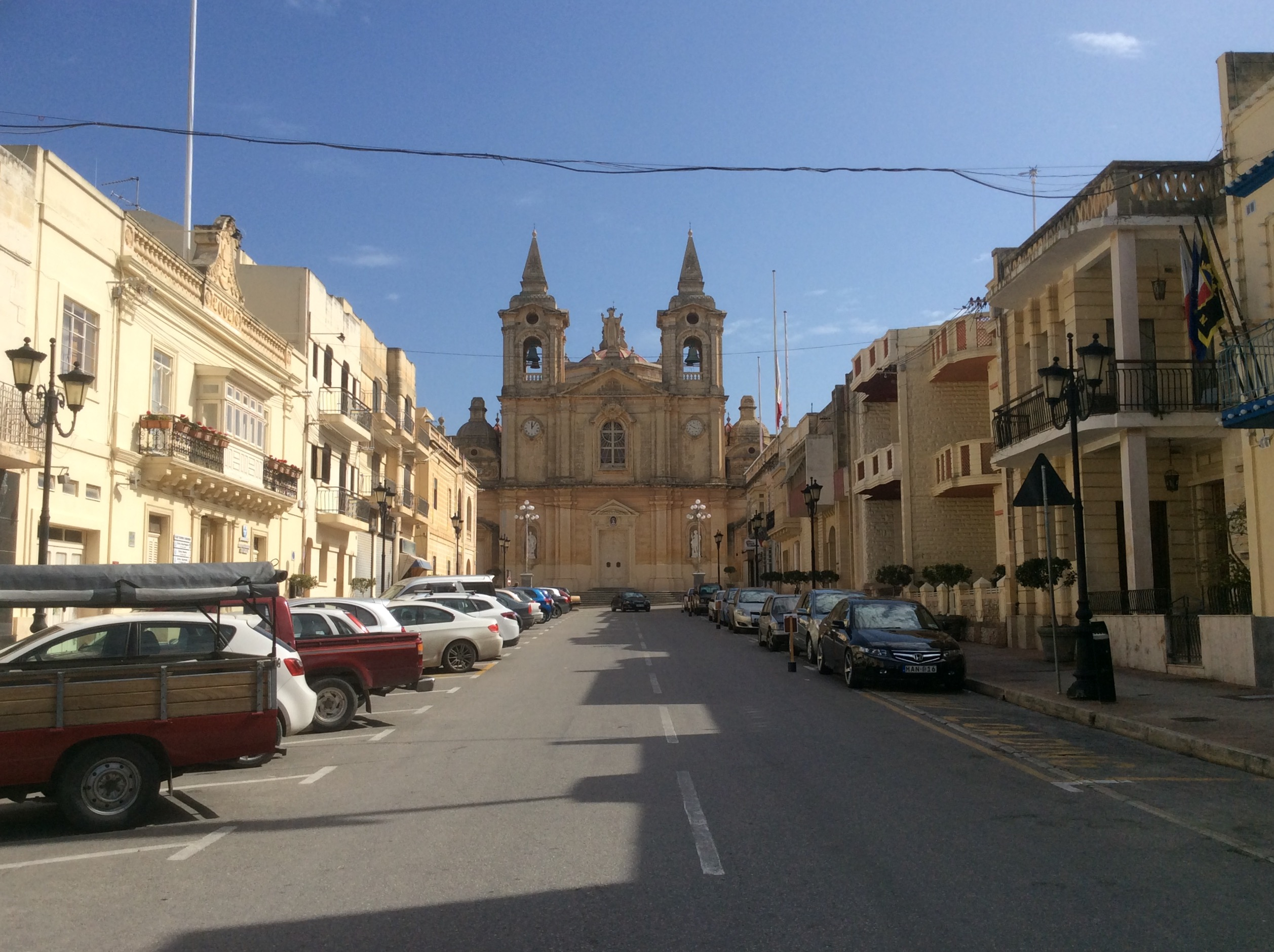
- St. Catherine of Alexandria Parish Church, as viewed from Mattia Preti in Malta

- Flag Coat of arms
- Motto: Mill-Baħar iżraq ħadt ismi Sic a cyaneo aequore vocor (From the blue sea I got my Name)
- Coordinates: 35°49′45″N 14°28′33″E
- Country: Malta
- Region: Western Region
- District: South Eastern District
- Borders: Birżebbuġa, Kirkop, Luqa, Mqabba, Qrendi, Safi

Government
  - Mayor: Rita Grima (PL)

Area
  - Total: 10.5 km^{2} (4.1 sq mi)

Population (Jul. 2024)
  - Total: 12,731
  - Density: 1,210/km^{2} (3,140/sq mi)
- Demonym(s): Żurrieqi (m), Żurrieqija (f), Żrieraq (pl)
- Time zone: UTC+1 (CET)
  - Summer (DST): UTC+2 (CEST)
- Postal code: ZRQ
- Dialing code: 356
- ISO 3166 code: MT-68
- Patron saint: St. Catherine of Alexandria
- Day of festa: St Catherine - 1st Sunday of September / 25 November Our Lady Of Mount Carmel - Week Before Last Sunday of July Assumption Of Mary (Bubaqra) - Week After The 15th Of August
- Website: zurrieqlocalcouncil.com

Żurrieq (Maltese: Iż-Żurrieq [ɪzːʊˈrːɪːʔ]) is a town in the Western Region of Malta. It is one of the oldest towns in the country. Żurrieq is one of the 10 parishes to be documented in 1436 and is dedicated to Saint Catherine. The town stretches from Nigret to Ħal Far. In old times the town had a border with Żejtun. The village of Qrendi used to be part of the parish of Żurrieq until 1618 when it was made into its own parish.

The population of Żurrieq was 12,731 in July 2024. This included 6,561 males and 6,170 females; 11,647 Maltese nationals and 1,084 foreign nationals.

Żurrieq is part of District 5 and votes for the local council every five years. The council is made up of nine members, one of them is the mayor.

== Main Landmarks ==
One of the most popular landmarks is the Blue Grotto. Locally it is known as 'Il-Ħnejja' (the arch). It is known for the beautiful shades of blue under the arch. People can go into the arch by boarding a luzzu from Wied Iż-Żurrieq.

Another popular landmark is the Xarolla Windmill. It is found in the limits of Żurrieq near Ħal Safi. It is one of the few restored Maltese windmills around the islands. During restorations, catacombs were found underneath the windmill. In front of the windmill is a small chapel dating to the time of the Knights dedicated to Saint Andrew. The chapel has also been restored. In the house of the archpriest one can find a small Punic tower which was built when Malta was under the control of the Phoenicians. There are also remains of a Roman tower near the remains of a chapel in tal-Baqqari. There are a number of churches and chapels in Żurrieq, among them the Parish Church of Saint Catherine and a medieval chapel dedicated to the Annunciation.

Żurrieq is also known for its big feasts which are held in summer. The first one, which is dedicated to Our Lady of Mount Carmel, is celebrated on the third Sunday of July. The titular feast is held in the honour of Saint Catherine. The feast is held on the first Sunday of September. During both feasts the streets of the town is adorned with decorations. A week of masses and marches are held leading up to Sunday where the statue is carried around the town in a procession. Fireworks are also used throughout the week with a firework show on the eve of the feast. A feast of Saint Catherine is also held on the 25th of November as it is the liturgical feast of Saint Catherine.

== Churches and chapels ==
=== Parish Church dedicated to Saint Catherine of Alexandria ===
The building of the current church started in 1632–1633 under the direction of Rev. Matteolo Saliba, who was also the architect of the new church. The church was completed in 1658.

The church includes a number of paintings by Mattia Preti. These include the Martyrdom of Saint Stephen, Martyrdom of Saint Andrew, Martyrdom of Saint Catherine of Alexandria, Eternal Father, Visitation of the Virgin to Saint Elizabeth, Saint Roch, Saint Blaise, Saint Dominic, Saint Nicholas of Tolentino and of Our Lady of Graces.

=== Bubaqra Church dedicated to the Assumption of Mary (ta' Santa Marija) ===
The present church may have been built on the original site of two old chapels, one dedicated to Saint Roch and the other to Saint Sebastian. The chapel of Saint Mary was built after the plague of 1676. The chapel experienced major restructuring in 1961 when it was enlarged to accommodate the increasing population of the area. This was done on the initiative of Rev. Salv Farrugia.At the present day the church is being taken care of by the Kumitat Pastorali ta' Bubaqra.

=== Nigret Chapel dedicated to the Immaculate conception of Mary ===
The present church was built on the site of a previous chapel dedicated to the Annunciation which was deconsecrated by Bishop Miguel Juan Balaguer Camarasa on 24 November 1658. The church was built by commander James Togores de Valemuola and was finally consecrated by the parish priest of the village Rev. Karm Delicata on 11 October 1739.

=== Chapel of the Annunciation, Ħal Millieri ===
The now uninhabited village of Ħal-Millieri was first documented in 1419 though it originates from Roman or even pre-historic times. The present church was built around 1450 on the site of an earlier 13th century chapel.

The chapel was consecrated in 1480. During Monsignor Pietro Dusina's apostolic visit to Ħal-Millieri, in 1575, he found that there were a total of four churches in the area. Only two of these remain standing; the Annunciation and Saint John the Evangelist. During his visit, Dusina found that the church was in a state of good repair, had three altars and paved. However, he found that the church was not equipped with sacred vestments, income or even a rector.

=== Chapel of Saint John the Evangelist in Ħal Millieri ===
The original medieval chapel dedicated to Saint John was built sometime around 1481. It is recorded in inquisitor Pietro Dusina's report of his apostolic visit to the chapel in 1575. The report states that the chapel was in a dilapidated state, there were no doors, there were stone benches and a floor of beaten earth. Consequently, the church was deconsecrated. However, some time later it was reconsecrated and equipped with religious objects.

=== Chapel of St. Leo ===
The chapel serves as the official cemetery chapel of Żurrieq. It is the only such chapel dedicated to Pope Leo I in Malta. This chapel was closed in 1658 and reopened twenty years later, after the necessary restoration had been carried out. In this chapel one could also find an old painting on wood that from 1343 to 1575 was in the chapel in Filfla. Today, this painting is found in the parish church of Żurrieq.

=== Chapel of St. Agatha ===
The original church which stood on the site of the present church was built sometime in the 16th century. However it was deconsecrated by the Bishop of Malta, Balaguer on 24 November 1658. The present church was built by Cikku Grixti as a fulfillment of a vow made by a woman. It was blessed by the vicar general Philip Amato on 27 February 1859. The church served as a spiritual base for British soldiers during World War II. In 1952, the church was enlarged and decorated with important items such as the Via Crucis and new vestments. The painting depicting Saint Agatha was restored by R. Bonnici Cali.

=== Chapel of St. James ===
This church is first recorded in the report dating from 1575 during the apostolic visit of inquisitor Pietro Dusina. Beside the original church was another church dedicated to Saint John the Baptist. Both churches were demolished in the early 18th century to make way for a new and bigger church dedicated to Saint James. Work commenced in 1725 and was completed by June 24, 1731.

=== Chapel of St. Bartholomew ===
The original chapel of Saint Bartholomew was built in the year 1482. It was one of the churches which the inquisitor Pietro Dusina visited during his apostolic visit in 1575. He reported that the chapel was in a good state and was equipped with all necessary objects to function, however it lacked a rector and an income.

=== Chapel of St. Andrew ===
Saint Andrew's was first mentioned in the reports recounting the visit of inquisitor Pietro Dusina in 1575. However, the chapel was rebuilt in 1634 as mentioned in other pastoral visits. The chapel was deconsecrated in 1658 by Bishop Balaguer. The church remained unused until 1690 when the chapel became the property of the parish church of Saint Catherine.

=== Chapel of St. Luke ===
The origin of the chapel of Saint Luke dates back to the 15th century. It was donated by its benefactor Luqa Zammit in his will dated 1460 as revealed in the notary documents of Luqa Sillato. However, the present structure dates from 1814 when the church was rebuilt on the initiative of Rev. Ġwann Zammit.

=== Peace Laboratory ===
In 1971 Fr Dionysius Mintoff took over an air force hangar to use as a centre of peace activities, dedicating it to Pope John XXIII. The area was later developed as a peace laboratory.

== Feasts ==
- Saint Catherine of Alexandria
- Our Lady of Mount Carmel
- Our Lady of the Rosary
- Our Lady of tal-Warda
- Saint Joseph
- Saint Rocco
- Saint Stephen
- Saint Andrew
- Saint Clementine
- Sacred Heart of Jesus, celebrated in the parish church and also in Nigret.
- Corpus Christi
- The Assumption of our Lady, Celebrated in Bubaqra

== Bands and clubs ==
- Soċjeta Mużikali Santa Katarina V. M. AD. 1864
- Għaqda Karmelitana Banda Queen Victoria AD.1865
- Knisja ta' Santa Marija ta' Bubaqra

== Streets showing Roman Catholic Faith ==
- Misrah Santa Marija(Saint Mary Square)
- Misraħ San Ġorg (Saint Georges Square)
- Misraħ il-Karmelitani (Carmelites Square)
- Triq Santa Katarina (St. Catherine's Street)
- Triq il-Benedittini (Benedictines Street)
- Triq il-Karmnu (Our Lady of Mount Carmel Street)
- Triq il-Kunċizzjoni (Immaculate Conception Street)
- Triq l-Isqof Alpheran (Bishop Alpheran Street)
- Triq San Bartilmew (St. Bartholomew Street)
- Triq Sant'Luqa ( St. Luke Street)
- Triq San Bastjan (St. Sebastian Street)
- Triq San Ċiru (St. Ciros Street)
- Triq San David (St. David Street)
- Triq San Ġorġ (St. George Street)
- Triq San Ġwann (St. John Street)
- Triq San Iljun (St. Lion Street)
- Triq San Pawl (St. Paul Street)
- Triq San Mark (St. Mark Street)
- Triq San Lazzru (St. Lazrus)
- Triq Sant'Antnin (St. Antony Street)
- Triq San Nikola (St. Nicholas Street)
- Triq San Pietru (St. Peter Street)
- Triq San Gwann (St. John Street)
- Triq San Mikiel (St. Michael Street)
- Triq San Martin (St. Martin Street)
- Triq Sant'Iljun (St. Lion Street)
- Triq San Bastjan (St. Sebastian Street)
- Triq Sant'Agata (St. Agatha Street)
- Triq Sant'Porfirju
- Triq Santa Fawstina
- Triq Sant'Andrija (St. Andrew Street)
- Triq Santa Katerina tal-Baqqari
- Triq Monsinjur Pietru Pawl Saydon
- Triq Monsinjur Pullicino
- Triq il-Kanonku Balzan
- Triq l-Immakulata ( Immaculate Conception Street)
- Trejqa l-Iben il-Ħali ( Prodigal Son Street)
- Sqaq il-Karmnu Nru.1 u Nru.2 (Our Lady of Mount Carmel Alley No.1 and No.2)
- Sqaq il-Kunċizzjoni (Immaculate Conception Alley)
- Sqaq San Anard (St. Leonard Alley)
- Sqaq San Bartolimew (St. Bartholomew Alley)
- Sqaq San Ċiru (St. Ciros Alley)
- Sqaq San Edwardu (St. Edward Alley)
- Sqaq San Ġakmu (St. James Alley)
- Sqaq San Ġużepp (St. Joseph Alley)
- Sqaq San Ġwann (St. John Alley)
- Sqaq San Martin (St. Martin Alley)
- Sqaq San Patrizju (St. Patrick's Alley)
- Żona Tal-Bambina (The Nativity of Our Lady Area)
- Triq Santa Katerina tal-Baqqari

== Language ==
The primary language spoken in Żurrieq is the Zurrieq dialect of the Maltese language.

== Zones ==
- Bubaqra
- Nigret
- Xarolla
- Tal-Bebbux
- Tal-Ġawhar
- Ta' Xaqqa
- Taż-Żutli
- Tal-Għerien
- Taċ-Ċantar
- Tax-Xewki
- Tal-Ġibjun
- Tal-Baqqari
- Ta' Taħt iċ-Ċint
- Ħal Millieri
- Ħal Lew
- Ħal Far
- Ħal Manin
- Wied Ganu
- Wied Żurrieq
- Wied Babu
- Wied Ħallelin
- Wied Basasa
- Wied Żnuber
- Wied Fulija
- Għar Ħasan

== Twin towns – sister cities ==
Żurrieq is twinned with:

- Angermünde, Germany
- Borgo Maggiore, San Marino
- Morphou, Cyprus
- Taverna, Italy
- Pedara, Italy
